= White gods =

Fringe theories about the origin of some gods

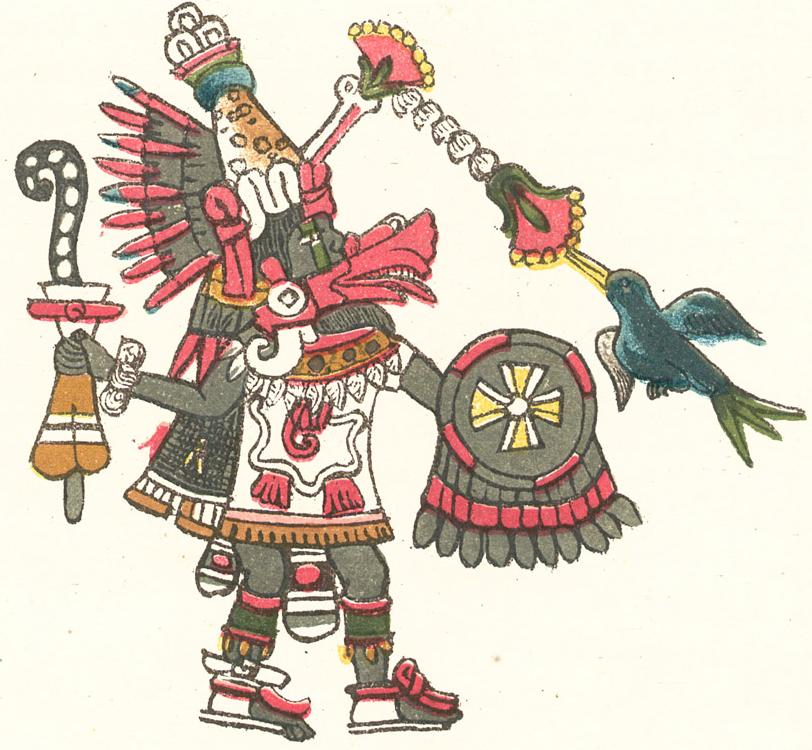
- The Aztec god Quetzalcoatl, who it was believed that the Aztecs mistook conquistador Hernán Cortés for
- Claims: Native Americans made contact with pre-Columbian European explorers, influencing their religions and culture. In post-conquest history, the white gods myth suggests that Hernán Cortés was believed to be the return of Quetzalcoatl.
- Related scientific disciplines: Archaeology

White gods is the pseudohistorical belief that ancient cultures around the world were visited by white races in ancient times, and that they were known as "white gods".

Some authors have claimed that white missionaries or "gods" visited the Americas before Christopher Columbus. Authors usually quote from mythology and legends which discuss ancient gods such as Quetzalcoatl to conclude that the legends were actually based on Caucasians visiting those areas, and that the Caucasians were really the gods.

This story was first reported in 1553 by Pedro Cieza de León, and later by Pedro Sarmiento de Gamboa. Similar accounts by Spanish chroniclers (such as Juan de Betanzos) describe Viracocha as a "white god", often with a beard.

The first Spanish chroniclers from the 16th century, however, made no mention of any identification with Viracocha. The first to do so was Pedro Cieza de León in 1553. Similar accounts by Spanish chroniclers (e.g. Juan de Betanzos) describe Viracocha as a "white god", often with a beard. However, the whiteness of Viracocha is not mentioned in the native authentic legends of the Incas. Most modern scholars, therefore, consider the "white god" story to be a post-conquest Spanish invention.

== Proponents ==
Rupert Furneaux also linked "white gods" to the ancient city of Tiahuanaco.

Colonel A. Braghine in his 1940 book The Shadow of Atlantis claimed that the Carib people have reports and legends of a white bearded man whom they called Tamu or Zune who had come from the East, taught the people agriculture and later disappeared in an "easterly direction". Braghine also claimed Manco Cápac was a white bearded man. The Atlantis author Gerd von Hassler linked the "white gods" to the biblical flood.

20th-century Norwegian explorer Thor Heyerdahl, best known for his voyage across the Pacific in a reconstruction of an ancient vessel in an effort to prove that Polynesia was peopled by South American voyagers, believed that a white race inhabited South America.

The archaeologist Pierre Honoré in 1962 proposed the fringe theory that the pre-Columbian Mesoamerican civilizations were due to "white men from the vicinity of Crete".

Writer and treasure-hunter Robert F. Marx wrote extensively about the concept of "white gods". Marx came to the conclusion that white gods "figure in almost every indigenous culture in the Americas."

The British writer Harold T. Wilkins took the concept of the white gods the furthest, writing that a vanished white race had occupied the whole of South America in ancient times. Wilkins also claimed that Quetzalcoatl was from Atlantis.

The occultist James H. Madole, influenced by Aryanism and Hinduism, wrote that the Aryan race was of great antiquity and had been worshipped worldwide by lower races as "white gods". Madole also wrote that the Aryans originated in the Garden of Eden located in North America.

Most modern scholars consider the "white god legends" to be a post-conquest Spanish invention and that the ideas are based on pseudoscience.

== Hernán Cortés as Quetzalcoatl ==
Early accounts of the Spanish conquest describe Hernán Cortés as mistaken for the god Quetzalcōātl by the Aztec Empire. Author and historian Camilla Townsend disputes these claims of belief in the white god mythos by analyzing sources written after the conquest by mostly Spanish authors. These Spanish authors likely had political motive for depicting Aztec leader Moctezuma II as a weak leader who perceived Cortés as a god.

== Beliefs of the Church of Jesus Christ of Latter Day Saints ==
Some Mormon theorists have suggested that the Izapa Stela 5 depicts the Tree of Life.

Some Mormons believe that Quetzalcoatl, a figure described as white and bearded, who came from the sky and promised to return, was likely Jesus Christ. According to the scriptural account recorded in the Book of Mormon, Jesus Christ visited and taught natives of the Americas following his resurrection, and regarded them as the "other sheep" whom he had referenced during his mortal ministry. The Book of Mormon also claims that Jesus Christ appeared to others, following his resurrection, even to the inhabitants on the "isles of the sea." With regard to the Mexican legend, LDS Church President John Taylor wrote:

The story of the life of the Mexican divinity, Quetzalcoatl, closely resembles that of the Savior; so closely, indeed, that we can come to no other conclusion than that Quetzalcoatl and Christ are the same being.

This idea was adapted by Mormon science fiction author Orson Scott Card in his story "America".

== Ancient astronauts ==
Some ancient astronaut and UFO writers have claimed the "white gods" were actually extraterrestrials. Peter Kolosimo believed that the legends of Quetzalcoatl had a basis in fact. He claimed that the legends actually describe a race of white men who were born in spaceships and migrated to Atlantis; then, after Atlantis was destroyed, they moved to the Americas to be treated as "white gods" by the "primitive earth-dwellers".

== See also ==
- Blond Eskimos
- Nordic aliens
- "The Man Who Would Be King"
- Pre-Columbian trans-oceanic contact theories
- Theory of Phoenician discovery of the Americas
- White Amazonian Indians
- White savior
