= Ancient astronauts =

Pseudoscientific claims of past alien contact

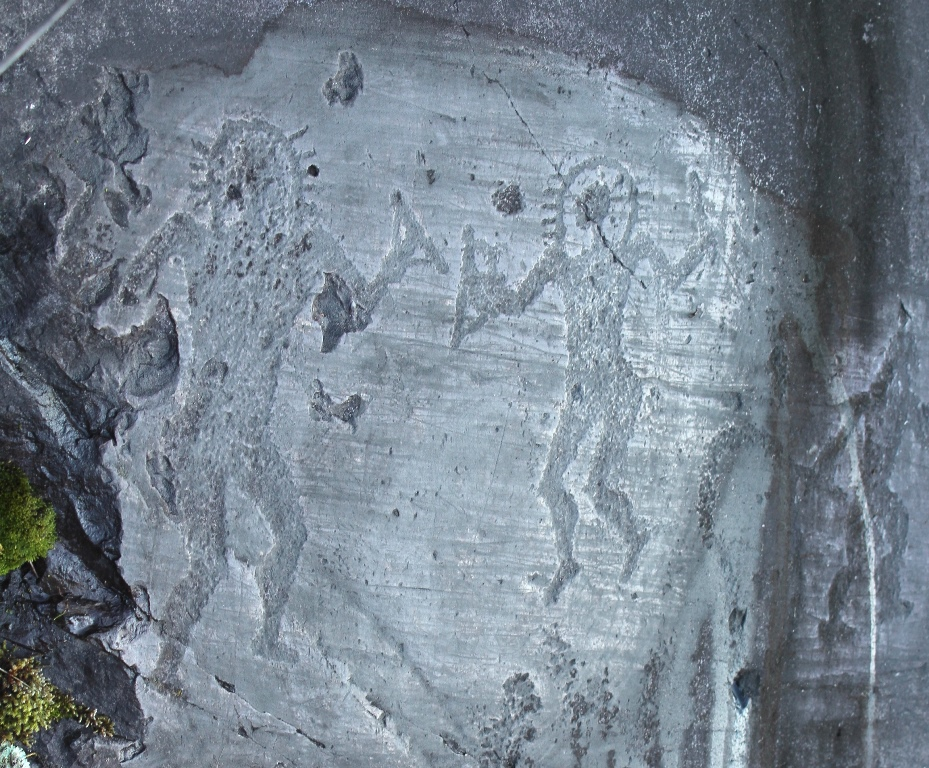
- Petroglyphs from Val Camonica, Italy; ancient astronauts proponents believe that these figures resemble astronauts.
- Claims: Intelligent extraterrestrial life visited the Earth in ancient times and affected human civilization.
- Related scientific disciplines: Archaeology

Ancient astronauts (also ancient aliens or paleocontact) are a pseudoscientific set of beliefs that intelligent extraterrestrial beings (alien astronauts) visited Earth and made contact with humans in antiquity and prehistoric times. Proponents of the theory suggest that this contact influenced the development of modern cultures, technologies, religions, and human biology. A common position is that deities from most (if not all) religions are extraterrestrial in origin, and that advanced technologies brought to Earth by ancient astronauts were interpreted as evidence of divine status (Note: Quote from science fiction author Arthur Clarke: "Any sufficiently advanced technology will appear indistinguishable from magic.") by early humans.

The idea that ancient astronauts existed and visited Earth is not taken seriously by academics and archaeologists, who identify such claims as pseudoarchaeological or unscientific. It has received no credible attention in peer-reviewed studies. When proponents of the idea present evidence in favor of their beliefs, it is often distorted or fabricated. Some authors and scholars also argue that ancient astronaut theories have racist undertones or implications, diminishing the accomplishments and capabilities of indigenous cultures.

Well-known proponents of these beliefs in the latter half of the 20th century who have written numerous books or appear regularly in mass media include Robert Charroux, Jacques Bergier, Jean Sendy, Erich von Däniken, Alexander Kazantsev, Zecharia Sitchin, Robert K. G. Temple, Giorgio A. Tsoukalos, David Hatcher Childress, Peter Kolosimo, and Mauro Biglino.

== Overview ==
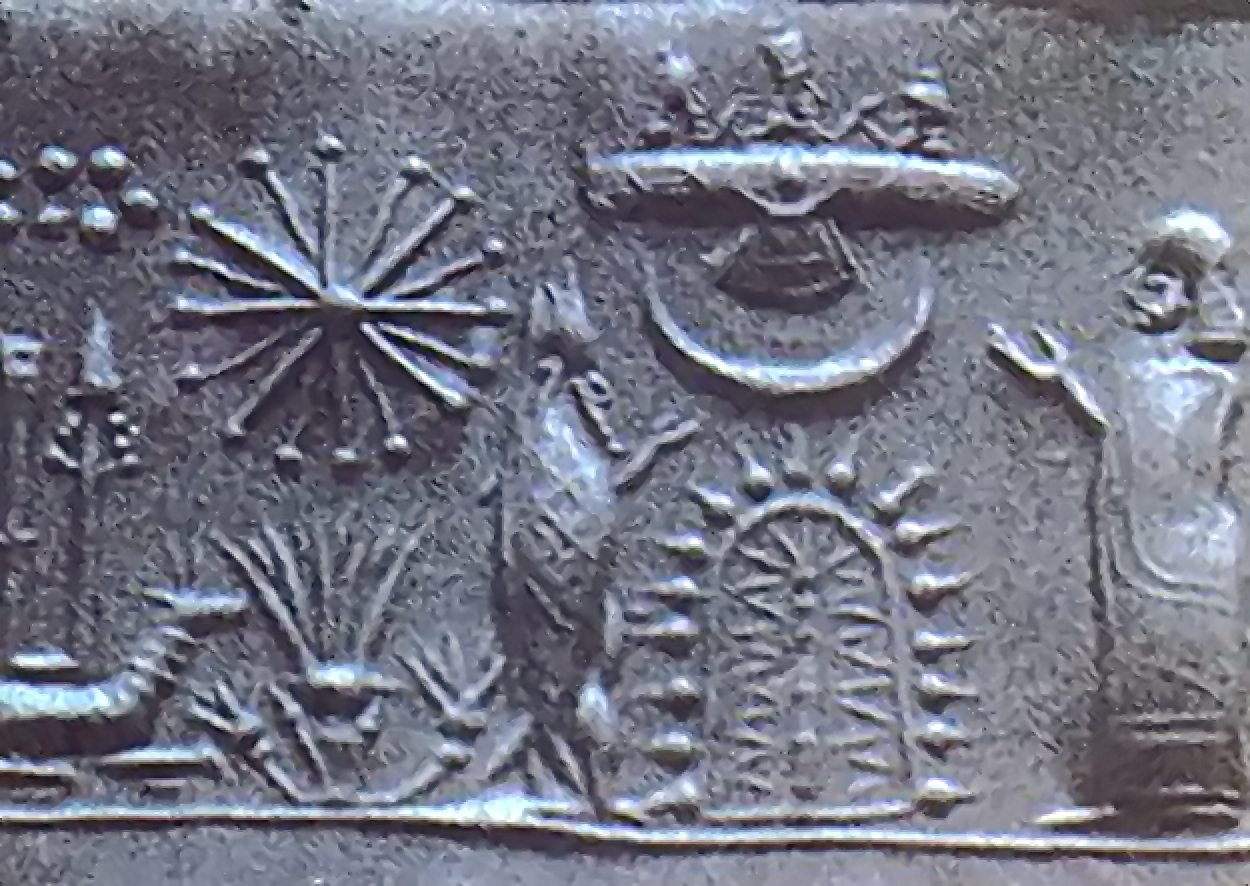
Mesopotamian cylinder seal

Various terms are used to reference claims about ancient astronauts, such as ancient aliens, ancient ufonauts, ancient space pilots, paleocontact, astronaut- or alien gods, or paleo- or biblical-SETI (search for extraterrestrial intelligence).

Believers in such ancient astronaut stories often maintain that all or some humans are either descendants or creations of extraterrestrial intelligence who landed on Earth at some point in the ancient past. An associated idea is that human knowledge, religion, and culture came from extraterrestrial visitors in ancient times, in that ancient astronauts acted as a "mother culture". Additionally, proponents often claim that travelers from outer space built many of the structures on Earth (such as Egyptian pyramids and the Moai stone heads of Easter Island) or aided humans in building them. Proponents contend that the evidence for ancient astronauts comes from documentary gaps in historical and archaeological records while citing archaeological artifacts that they believe, contrary to the mainstream explanations, are anachronistic and supposedly beyond the technical capabilities of the people who made them. These are sometimes referred to as "out-of-place artifacts"; and include artwork and legends which believers reinterpret to fit stories of extraterrestrial contact or technologies.

As a pseudoarcheology, the idea receives notice in fringe pulp media, such as the History Channel series Ancient Aliens. Such shows use a strategy known as 'fire-hosing' to co-mingle fact with fiction in order to spread theories of an alternate past with tropes that follow white supremacist, nativist, imperialist, settler-colonial, and Christian Identity beliefs relevant to the past. The celebrity proponents of ancient aliens profess to be a part of an oppressed minority of academics that 'big archaeology' is conspiring to disenfranchise while their identity of being a maverick or a rogue aligns with the individuals' lack of credentials.

Like archaeological endeavors of the criticized past, these proponents focus primarily on monumental archaeological structures claiming they could have only been constructed with extraterrestrial intervention. The implication is that the non-white Indigenous people in the regions in which these monuments appear could not have built them on their own. However, Dakota/Lakota Sioux writer Ruth H. Burns, in Atmos magazine, counters that ancient alien theory and the idea of extraterrestrials in general supports the viewpoints of indigenous, non-European peoples. She believes the denial of extraterrestrial encounters and indigenous peoples' stories tracing their origins to extraterrestrials is part of "Indigenous erasure," as it minimizes or completely discounts the viewpoints of indigenous peoples. Many indigenous peoples trace their ancestry to "star-people" or the like—extraterrestrials who as the progenitors of indigenous peoples cannot by definition be white or "Aryan."

A common feature in the stories portray the aliens as light-skinned or Aryan in complexion, as prominent alien astronaut proponent Erich von Däniken claims in his foundational work Chariots of the Gods? Some ancient astronaut proponents are thus associated with white supremacism, although their theories are sometimes applied to European cultures as well.

Archaeologists have ignored the existence of these outlandish claims. However due to rising popular belief in fringe theories, they began actively engaging with the public via social media around 2020 to advocate mainstream archeological views. The few dedicated popular science explainers and skeptics who did offer opinions on the ideas universally panned them. For example, Carl Sagan wrote, "In the long litany of 'ancient astronaut' pop archaeology, the cases of apparent interest have perfectly reasonable alternative explanations, or have been misreported, or are simple prevarications, hoaxes and distortions".

== History of ancient aliens beliefs and their proponents ==
Paleocontact or "ancient astronaut" narratives first appeared in the early science fiction of the late 19th and early 20th centuries, including 1892 novel The Germ Growers and the 1898 novel Edison's Conquest of Mars and the works of H.P. Lovecraft. The idea was proposed in earnest by journalist Harold T. Wilkins in 1954. It grew in popularity in the 1960s, mainly due to the Space Race and the success of Erich von Däniken's works, although it also received limited consideration as a serious hypothesis. Critics emerged throughout the 1970s, discrediting Von Däniken's claims. Ufologists separated the idea from the UFO controversy. By the early 1980s little remaining support could be found.

=== Clipeology ===
A related branch of ufology, known as clipeology (Italian: clipeologia), emerged in Italy during the late 1950s. The term was coined in 1959 by the Italian ufologist Umberto Corazzi from the Latin clypeus ("shield"), in reference to ancient Roman accounts describing clypei ardentes ("burning shields") or clypei flagrantes ("flaming shields"), which some proponents interpret as reports of unidentified flying objects. Supporters of clipeology examine literary, historical and artistic sources in search of descriptions or depictions that they interpret as evidence of ancient UFO sightings. Frequently cited Latin authors include Pliny the Elder, who in Naturalis Historia (II.100) described a clipeus ardens crossing the sky, Seneca the Younger, who referred to clypei among luminous atmospheric phenomena in the Naturales Quaestiones, and Julius Obsequens, whose Liber Prodigiorum mentions shield-like celestial apparitions.

=== Shklovsky and Sagan ===
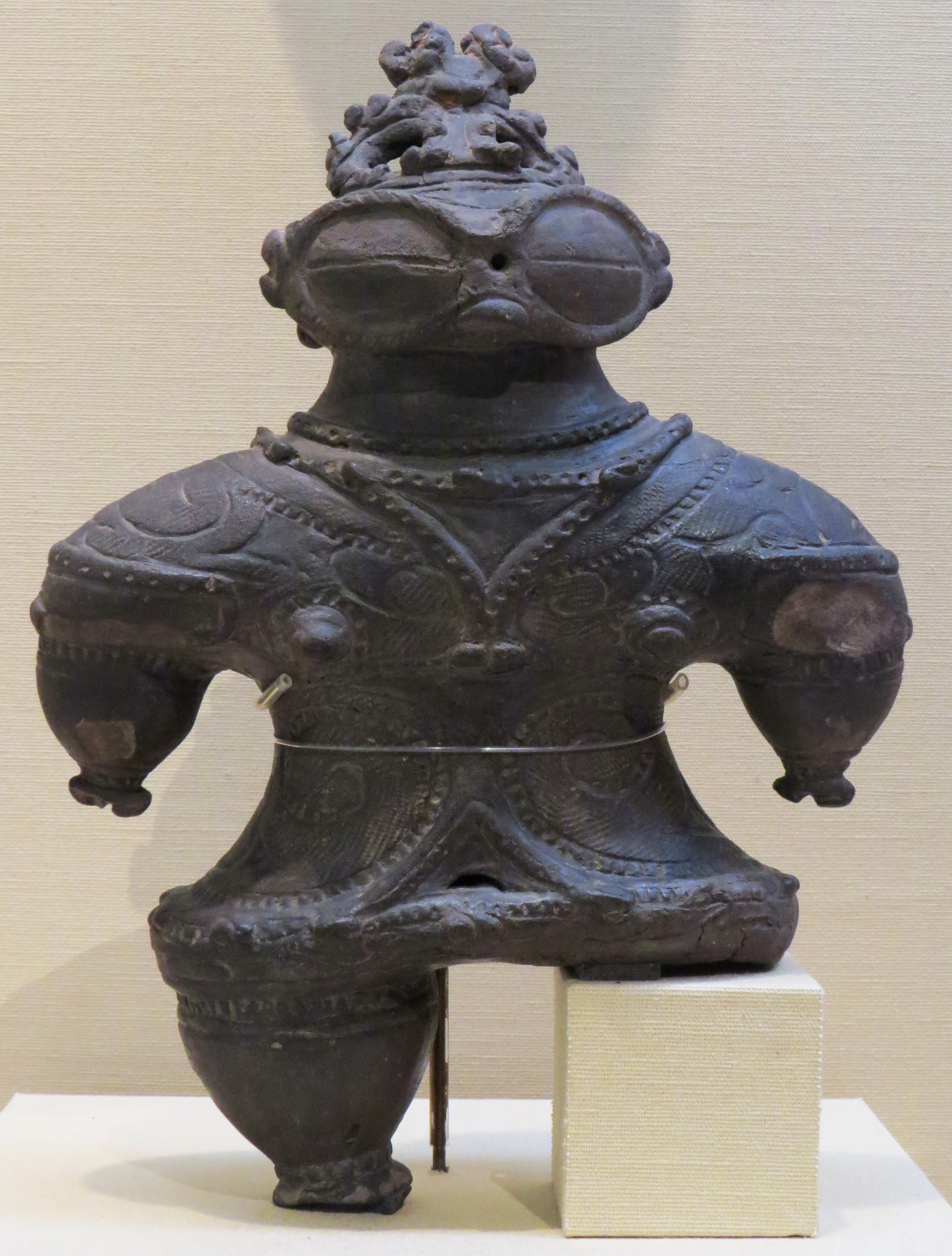
A Dogū figurine made during Jōmon period (dated 1000–400 BC).

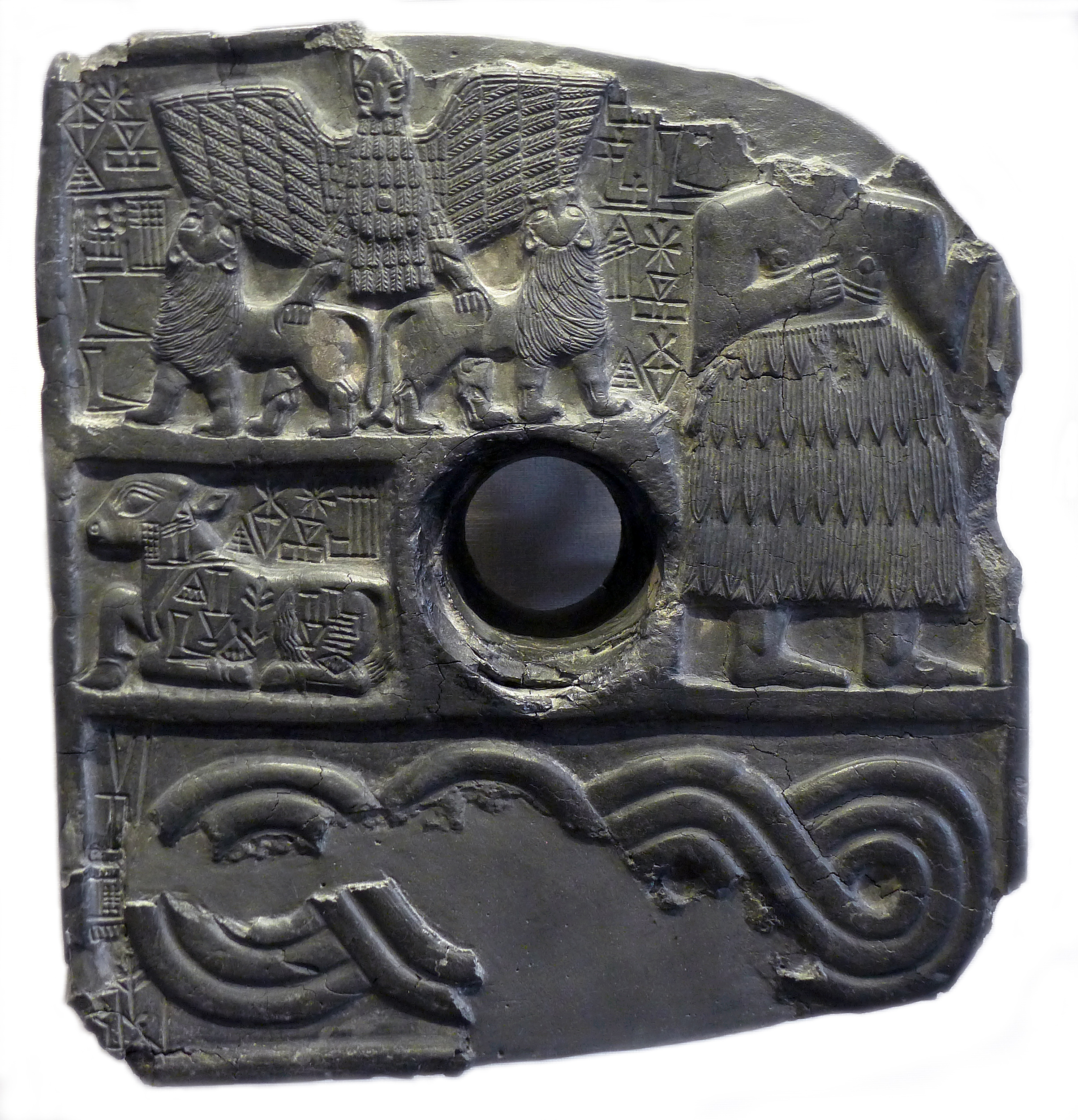
Votive relief of the winged priest of Dudu on display at the Louvre Museum, France

Carl Sagan co-authored a widely popular book Intelligent Life in the Universe, with Soviet astrophysicist Iosif Shklovsky and published in 1966. In his 1979 book Broca's Brain, Sagan suggested that he and Shklovsky might have inspired the wave of 1970s ancient astronaut books, expressing disapproval of "von Däniken and other uncritical writers" who seemingly built on these ideas not as guarded speculations but as "valid evidence of extraterrestrial contact." Sagan pointed out that while many legends, artifacts, and purported out-of-place artifacts were cited in support of ancient astronaut hypotheses, "very few require more than passing mention" and could be easily explained with more conventional hypotheses. Sagan also reiterated his earlier conclusion that extraterrestrial visits to Earth were possible but unproven and improbable.

=== Erich von Däniken ===
The sarcophagus lid of Pacal the Great

Erich von Däniken was a leading proponent of this hypothesis in the late 1960s and early 1970s, gaining a large audience through the 1968 publication of his best-selling book Chariots of the Gods? and its sequels.

According to von Däniken, certain artifacts require a more sophisticated technological ability in their construction than that which was available to the ancient cultures who constructed them. Von Däniken maintains that these artifacts were constructed either directly by extraterrestrial visitors or by humans who learned the necessary knowledge from said visitors. These include Stonehenge, Pumapunku, the Moai of Easter Island, the Great Pyramid of Giza, and the ancient Baghdad electric batteries.

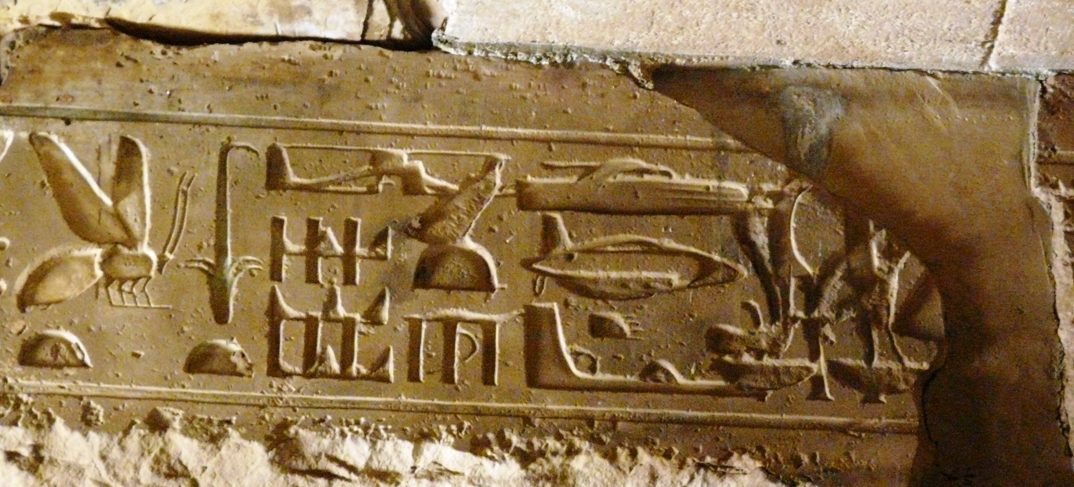
The so-called "Helicopter hieroglyphs", at Abydos, Egypt

Von Däniken writes that ancient art and iconography throughout the world illustrates air and space vehicles, non-human but intelligent creatures, ancient astronauts, and artifacts of an anachronistically advanced technology. Von Däniken also states that geographically separated historical cultures share artistic themes, which he argues imply a common origin. One such example is von Däniken's interpretation of the sarcophagus lid recovered from the tomb of the Classic-era Maya ruler of Palenque, Pacal the Great. Von Däniken writes that the design represented a seated astronaut. The iconography and accompanying Maya text, however, identifies it as a portrait of the ruler himself with the World Tree of Maya mythology.

The origins of many religions are interpreted by von Däniken as reactions to encounters with an alien race. According to his view, humans considered the technology of the aliens to be supernatural and the aliens themselves to be gods. Von Däniken states that the oral and written traditions of most religions contain references to alien visitors in the way of descriptions of stars and vehicular objects traveling through air and space. One such is Ezekiel's revelation, which Däniken interprets as a detailed description of a landing spacecraft (The Spaceships of Ezekiel).

Von Däniken's hypotheses became popularized in the U.S. after the NBC-TV documentary In Search of Ancient Astronauts hosted by Rod Serling, and the film Chariots of the Gods.

Critics argue that von Däniken misrepresented data, that many of his claims were unfounded, and that none of his core claims have been validated. In particular the Christian creationist community is highly critical of most of von Däniken's work. Young Earth creationist author Clifford A. Wilson published Crash Go the Chariots in 1972 in which he attempted to discredit all the claims made in Chariots of the Gods.

In Chariots of the Gods?, regarding the Nazca Lines, von Däniken states that "Seen from the air, the clear-cut impression that the 37-mile (60 km) long plain of Nazca made on me was that of an airfield." Considering he was in the process of seeking evidence of ancient aliens, von Däniken exhibits confirmation bias, as he does not consider the Nazca Lines to be man-made until after the publication of Chariots of the Gods? This etic perspective that he presents could be easily accepted by a reader familiar with air travel, and an undeveloped knowledge of the nature of the geoglyphs. Furthermore, since the majority of readers of Chariots of the Gods? are not educated in viewing artifacts from ancient civilizations, their interpretations are highly subject to von Däniken's opinions of the artifacts. Kenneth L. Feder argues a reader seeing the Nazca Lines for the first time in a book about aliens would be much more likely to associate those features with extraterrestrial origins, rather than from a civilization that existed on Earth.

In 1970, von Däniken admitted that the Nazca markings "could have been laid out on their gigantic scale by working from a model using a system of coordinates."

=== Zecharia Sitchin ===
Zecharia Sitchin's series The Earth Chronicles, beginning with The 12th Planet, revolves around Sitchin's unique interpretation of ancient Sumerian and Middle Eastern texts, megalithic sites, and artifacts from around the world. He hypothesizes that the gods of old Mesopotamia were astronauts from the planet "Nibiru", which Sitchin states the Sumerians believed to be a remote "12th planet" (counting the Sun, Moon, and Pluto as planets) associated with the god Marduk. According to Sitchin, Nibiru continues to orbit the Sun on a 3,600-year elongated orbit. Modern astronomy has found no evidence to support Sitchin's ideas.

Sitchin argues that there are Sumerian texts that tell the story that 50 Anunnaki, inhabitants of a planet named Nibiru, came to Earth approximately 400,000 years ago with the intent of mining raw materials, especially gold, for transport back to Nibiru. With their small numbers they soon grew tired of the task and set out to genetically engineer laborers to work the mines. After much trial and error they eventually created Homo sapiens sapiens: the "Adapa" (model man) or Adam of later mythology. Sitchin contended the Anunnaki were active in human affairs until their culture was destroyed by global catastrophes caused by the abrupt end of the last ice age some 12,000 years ago. Seeing that humans survived and all they had built was destroyed, the Anunnaki left Earth after giving humans the opportunity and means to govern themselves. Sitchin's work has not received mainstream scholarly support and has been roundly criticized by professionals that have reviewed his hypotheses. Semitic languages scholar Michael S. Heiser says that many of Sitchin's translations of Sumerian and Mesopotamian words are not consistent with Mesopotamian cuneiform bilingual dictionaries, produced by ancient Akkadian scribes.

Alan F. Alford, author of Gods of the New Millennium (1996), was an adherent of the ancient astronaut hypothesis. Much of his work draws on Sitchin's hypotheses. However, he now finds fault with Sitchin's hypothesis after deeper analysis, stating that: "I am now firmly of the opinion that these gods personified the falling sky; in other words, the descent of the gods was a poetic rendition of the cataclysm myth which stood at the heart of ancient Near Eastern religions."

=== Robert Temple ===
Robert K. G. Temple's 1976 book, The Sirius Mystery, argues that the Dogon people of northwestern Mali preserved an account of extraterrestrial visitation from around 5,000 years ago. He quotes various lines of evidence, including advanced astronomical knowledge inherited by the tribe, descriptions, and comparative belief systems with ancient civilizations such as ancient Egypt and Sumer. His work draws heavily on the studies of cultural anthropologists Marcel Griaule and Germaine Dieterlen.

His conclusions have been criticized by scientists, who point out discrepancies within Temple's account, and suggested that the Dogon may have received some of their astronomical information recently, probably from European sources, and may have misrepresented Dogon ethnography.

=== UFO religions ===
Various new religious movements including some branches of Theosophy, Scientology, Raëlism, Aetherius Society, and Heaven's Gate believe in ancient and present-day contact with extraterrestrial intelligence. Many of these faiths see both ancient scriptures and recent revelations as connected with the action of aliens from other planetary systems. Psychologists have found that UFO religions have similarities which suggest that members of these groups consciously or subliminally associate enchantment with the memes of science fiction.

== Claims of proponents ==
Among scientists, the consensus is that the ancient astronaut hypothesis is not impossible, but unjustified and unnecessary. The "mysteries" cited as evidence for the hypothesis can be explained without having to invoke ancient astronauts; proponents look for mysteries where none exist. Since ancient astronauts are unnecessary, Occam's razor should be applied and the hypothesis rejected according to the scientific consensus.

=== Ancient religious texts ===
Proponents cite ancient mythologies to support their viewpoints based on the idea that ancient creation myths of gods who descend from the heavens to Earth to create or instruct humanity are representations of alien visitors, whose superior technology accounts for their perception as gods. Proponents draw an analogy to occurrences in modern time when isolated cultures are exposed to advanced technology, such as when, in the early 20th century, "cargo cults" were discovered in the South Pacific: cultures who believed various Western ships and their cargo to be sent from the gods as fulfillment of prophecies concerning their return.

The ancient Sumerian myth of Enûma Eliš, inscribed on cuneiform tablets and part of the Library of Ashurbanipal, says humankind was created to serve gods called the "Annunaki". Hypothesis proponents believe that the Annunaki were aliens who came to Earth to mine gold for their own uses. According to the hypothesis proponents, the Annunaki realized mining gold was taking a toll on their race, and then created the human race as slaves.

==== The Bible ====
===== Book of Genesis and Book of Enoch =====
The Book of Genesis, Chapter 6 verses 1–2 and 4, states:

When human beings began to increase in number on the earth and daughters were born to them, the sons of God saw that the daughters of humans were beautiful, and they married any of them they chose... The Nephilim were on the earth in those days—and also afterward—when the sons of God went to the daughters of humans and had children by them.

— Genesis 6:1–4 (New International Version)

Many Christians consider these groups to be the different families of Adam and Eve's children. Another interpretation is that the Nephilim are the children of the "sons of God" and "daughters of humans", although scholars are uncertain. The King James Version translates "Nephilim" as "giants" (or Gibborim). Ancient Astronaut proponents argue that Adam and Eve ate of the forbidden fruit in order "to be godlike", and this was the first step in human evolution.

The first part of the apocryphal Book of Enoch expands and interprets Genesis 6:1: that the "sons of God" were a group of 200 "angels" called "Watchers", who descended to Earth to breed with humans. Their offspring are the Nephilim, "giants" who "consumed all the acquisitions of men". When humans could no longer sustain the Nephilim, they turned against humanity. The Watchers also instructed humans in metallurgy and metalworking, cosmetics, sorcery, astrology, astronomy, and meteorology. God then ordered the Watchers to be imprisoned in the ground, and created the Great Flood (or the numerous Deluge myths) to rid Earth of the Nephilim and of the humans given knowledge by the Watchers. To ensure humanity's survival, Noah is forewarned of the oncoming destruction. Because they disobeyed God, the book describes the Watchers as "fallen angels".

Some ancient astronaut proponents argue that this story is a historical account of extraterrestrials visiting Earth, called Watchers because their mission was to observe humanity. Some of the extraterrestrials disobeyed orders; they made contact with humans, cross-bred with human females, and shared knowledge with them. The Nephilim were thus half-human-half-extraterrestrial hybrids.

Chuck Missler and Mark Eastman argue that modern UFOs carry the fallen angels, or offspring of fallen angels, and that "Noah's genealogy was not tarnished by the intrusion of fallen angels. It seems that this adulteration of the human gene pool was a major problem on the planet earth".

Von Däniken also suggests that the two angels who visited Lot in Genesis 19 were ancient astronauts, who used atomic weapons to destroy the city of Sodom.

Marc Dem reinterprets the Book of Genesis by writing that humanity started on another planet and that the God of the Bible is an extraterrestrial.

===== Book of Ezekiel =====
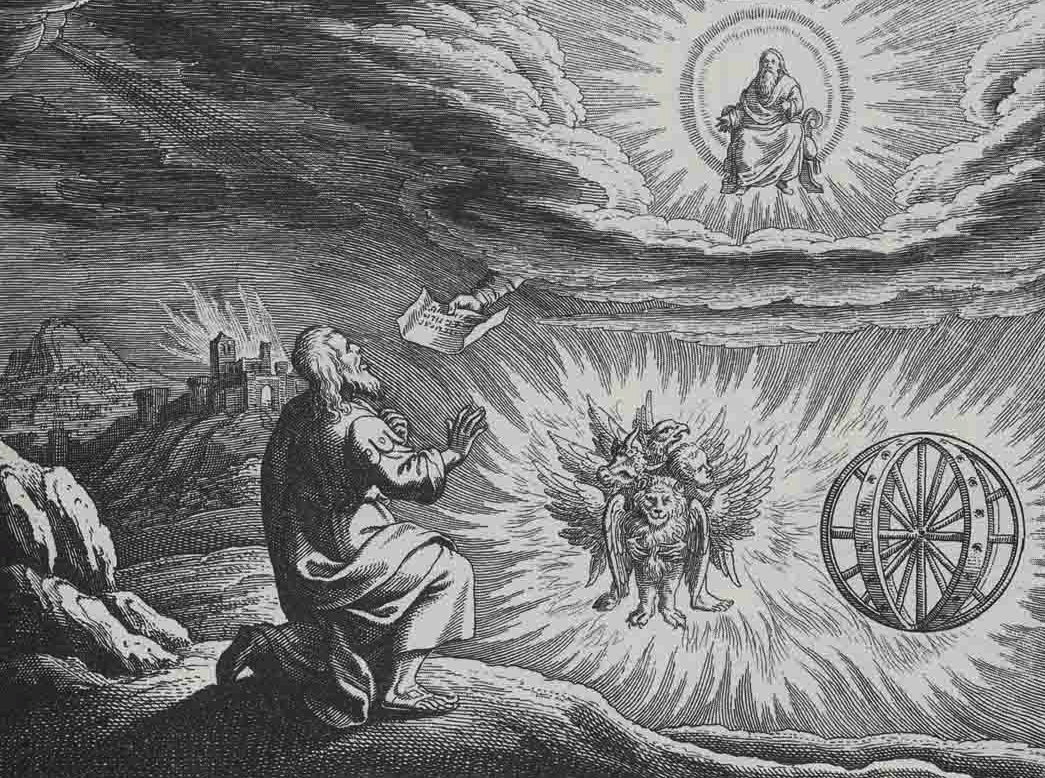
An engraved illustration of Ezekiel's 'vision' (1670)

Chapter 1 of the Book of Ezekiel recounts a vision in which Ezekiel sees "an immense cloud" that contains fire and emits lightning and "brilliant light". Within the cloud, the passage describes cherubim and ophanim:

...and in the fire was what looked like four living creatures. In appearance their form was human, but each of them had four faces and four wings. Their legs were straight; their feet were like those of a calf and gleamed like burnished bronze. Under their wings on their four sides they had human hands. All four of them had faces and wings, and the wings of one touched the wings of another. Each one went straight ahead; they did not turn as they moved... As I looked at the living creatures, I saw a wheel on the ground beside each creature with its four faces. This was the appearance and structure of the wheels: They sparkled like topaz, and all four looked alike. Each appeared to be made like a wheel intersecting a wheel. As they moved, they would go in any one of the four directions the creatures faced; the wheels did not change direction as the creatures went. Their rims were high and awesome, and all four rims were full of eyes all around. When the living creatures moved, the wheels beside them moved; and when the living creatures rose from the ground, the wheels also rose.

— Ezekiel 1:5–9, 15–19 (New International Version)

In Chapter 4 of Chariots of the Gods?, entitled "Was God an Astronaut?", von Däniken suggests that Ezekiel had seen a spaceship or spaceships; this hypothesis had been put forward by Morris Jessup in 1956 and by Arthur W. Orton in 1961. A detailed version of this hypothesis was described by Josef F. Blumrich in his book The Spaceships of Ezekiel (1974).

===== Elsewhere in the Bible =====
The characteristics of the Ark of the Covenant and the Urim and Thummim have been said to suggest high technology, perhaps from alien origins.

Robert Dione and Paul Misraki published books in the 1960s describing the events in the Bible as caused by alien technology. Barry Downing, a Presbyterian minister, wrote a book in 1968 arguing that Jesus was an extraterrestrial, citing John 8:23 and other biblical verses as evidence.

Some ancient astronaut proponents such as Von Däniken and Barry Downing believe that the concept of hell in the Bible could be a real description of the planet Venus brought to Earth by extraterrestrials showing photos of the hot surface on Venus to humans. Proponents of the hypothesis state that 'God' and 'Satan' were aliens that disagreed on whether or not human beings should be allowed the information that is offered by the tree of knowledge. David Childress, a leading proponent of ancient astronaut creation hypothesis, compares this story to the Greek tale of Prometheus, who gave mankind the knowledge of fire. Ancient Astronaut proponents believe the biblical concept of Satan is based on a misunderstood visit by extraterrestrials. Erich von Däniken posited that the descendants of extraterrestrials had children with hominids, and this was referred to in the Bible as the "Original sin." Von Däniken believes that the biblical great flood was punishment after an extraterrestrial 'God' discovered that earthbound, fallen angels were mating with ape-like early humans.

==== The Book of Invasions ====
Childress and others have written that the passage in the Book of Invasions describing the arrival of the Tuatha Dé Danann in Ireland, records "the arrival of aliens in spacecraft with cloaking devices" at Slieve Anierin. The text states "so that they were the Tuatha De Danand who came to Ireland. In this wise they came, in dark clouds. They landed on the mountains of Conmaicne Rein in Connacht and they brought a darkness over the sun for three days and three nights".

=== Ancient artwork ===
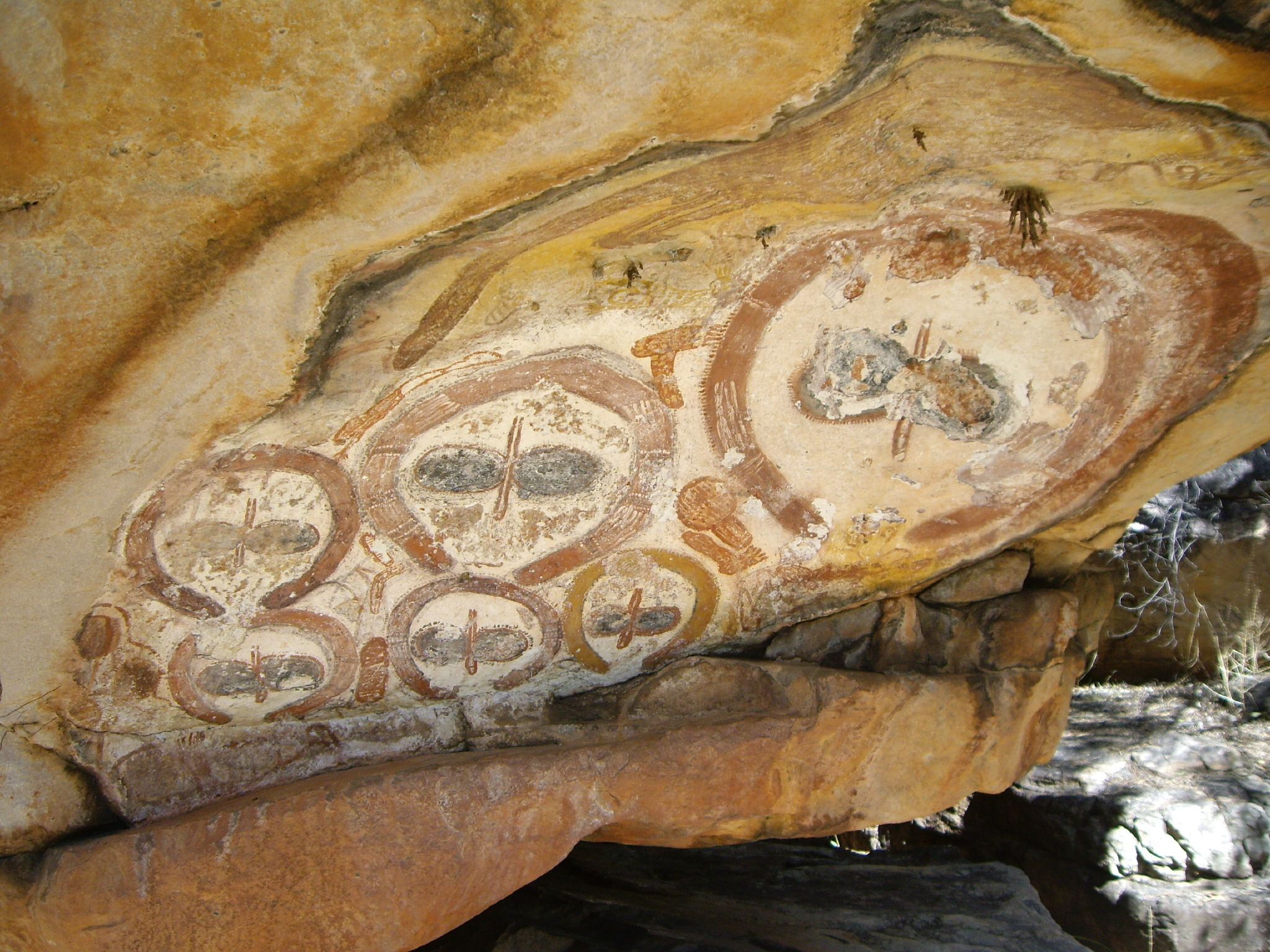
Wondjina rock art in the Kimberley region, Australia

==== Worldwide petroglyphic evidence ====
Ancient astronaut proponents believe Hopi cave drawings of Kachinas (spirit beings) found in the desert link the origins of the Hopi and Zuni tribes with "star people". They point to similar etchings elsewhere as evidence that extraterrestrials visited many different ancient civilizations.

Other artistic support for the ancient astronaut hypothesis has been sought in Palaeolithic cave paintings. Wondjina in Australia and in the Rock Drawings in Valcamonica, in Italy (seen above) are said to bear a resemblance to present day astronauts. Supporters of the ancient astronaut hypothesis sometimes argue that similarities such as dome shaped heads, interpreted as beings wearing space helmets, prove that early man was visited by an extraterrestrial race. Skeptics, however, argue that such drawings merely depict ancient combat helmets.

==== Medieval and Renaissance art ====
More support of this hypothesis draws upon what are said to be representations of flying saucers and other unidentified flying objects in Medieval and Renaissance art.

Some examples of these said objects include an ovoid shape in the sky of the painting Madonna con Bambino e San Giovannino (Madonna and Child with the Infant Saint John), an unidentified flying object in the Annunciazione (Annunciation) (1486) by Carlo Crivelli, a "spherical object with antennae" that appears similar to Sputnik in Bonaventura Salimbeni's Santissima Trinita (Holy Trinity) (1595), and many such unidentified flying objects in Masolino Da Panicale's Miracolo della neve (Miracle of the Snow) (1428). According to Italian art expert Diego Cuoghi, these objects contain religious symbolism behind them as most paintings of the time were of religious subjects. In such artworks, he says that angels and "radiant clouds" often appear in the sky. He says the object in the Madonna and Child is one of these radiant clouds, the object in the Annunciazione is a vortex of angels, the Sputnik-like object of Santissima Trinita is a globe representing creation with two sceptres held by God and Christ, and the Miracolo della neve contains many lenticular clouds.

==== Nazca Lines ====
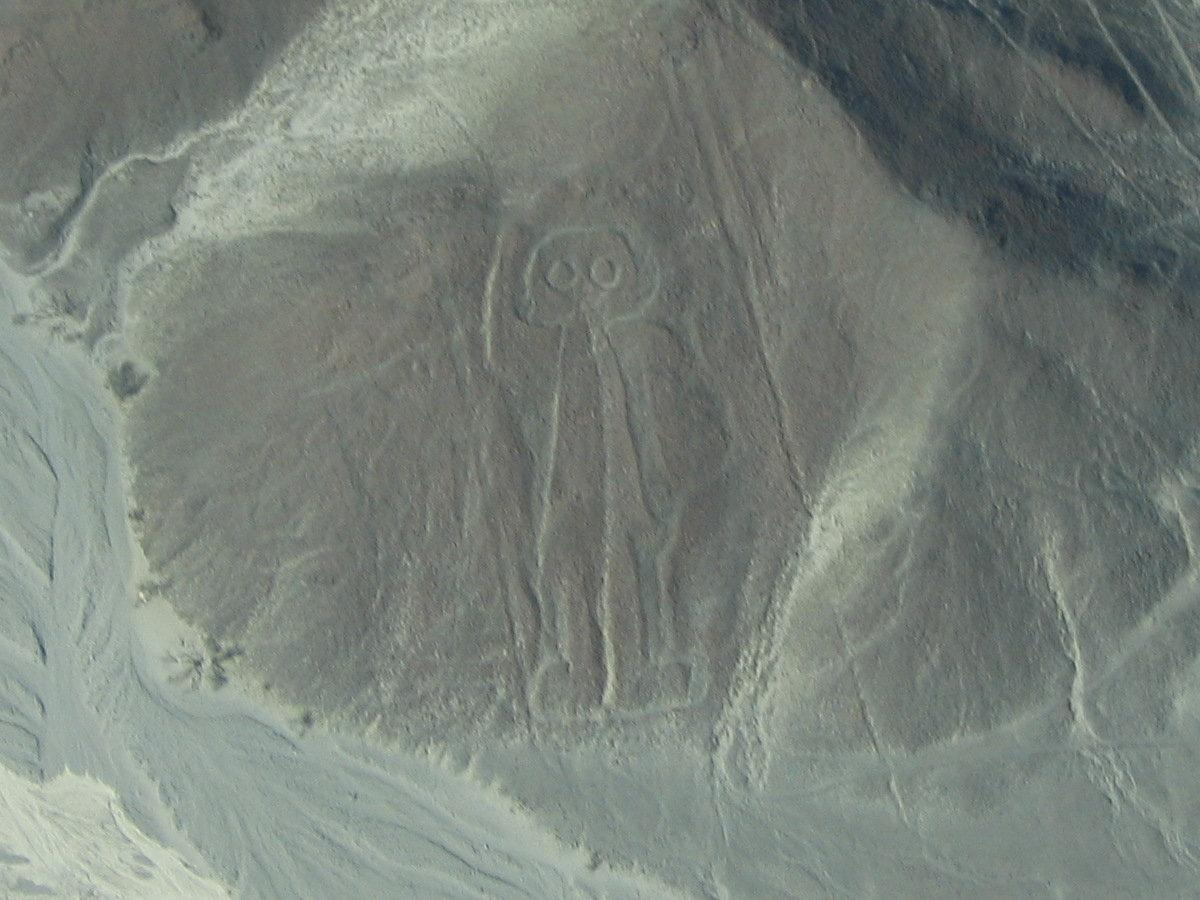
A large geoglyph near the Nazca Lines

The ancient Nazca Lines are hundreds of huge ground drawings etched into the high desert of southern Peru. Some are stylized animals and humanoid figures, while others are merely straight lines hundreds of meters long. As the figures were made to be seen from a great height, they have been linked with the ancient astronaut hypothesis. In the 1970s, the pseudohistorical writer Erich von Däniken popularized a notion that the Nazca lines and figures could have been made "according to instructions from aircraft" and that the longer and wider lines might be runways for spacecraft. According to archaeologist Kenneth Feder, Von Däniken's extraterrestrial interpretation is not supported by any evidence. Feder wrote that "the lines are interpreted by archaeologists as ceremonial pathways of the ancient Nazca people; they were used precisely in this way in the fairly recent past."

Joe Nickell of the University of Kentucky re-created one of the figures using only wooden stakes and string.

=== Ancient artifacts ===
==== Ancient flying machines ====
Proponents of the ancient astronauts idea say some artifacts discovered in Egypt (the Saqqara Bird) and Colombia-Ecuador (Quimbaya artifacts) are similar to modern planes and gliders. These artifacts have been interpreted by mainstream archaeologists, however, as stylized representations of birds and insects.

=== Ancient structures and megalithic sites ===
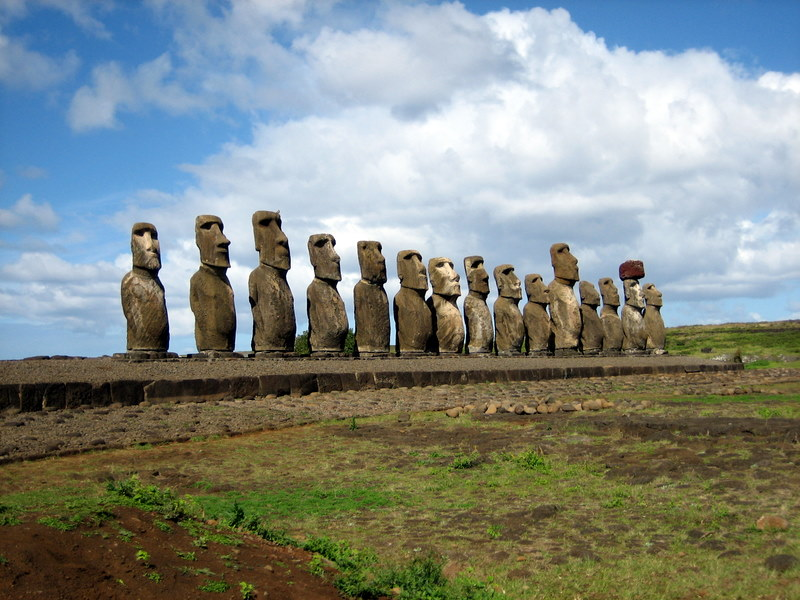
Ahu Tongariki near Rano Raraku

Proposed evidence for ancient astronauts includes the existence of ancient monuments and megalithic ruins such as the Giza pyramids of Egypt, Machu Picchu in Peru, or Baalbek in Lebanon, the Moai of Easter Island and Stonehenge of England. Supporters say that these stone structures could not have been built with the technical abilities and tools of the people of the time and further argue that many could not be duplicated even today. They suggest that the large size of the building stones, the precision with which they were laid, and the distances many were transported leaves the question open as to who constructed these sites.

These ideas are categorically rejected by mainstream archeology. Some mainstream archeologists have participated in experiments to move large megaliths. These experiments have succeeded in moving megaliths up to at least 40 tons, and some have speculated that with a larger workforce larger megaliths could be towed with the use of known ancient technology.

==== Pyramids of Egypt ====
Von Däniken states that ancient Egypt, with its great structures of the Giza pyramid complex such as the Great Pyramid of Giza and the Great Sphinx of Giza, became a "fantastic, ready-made civilization" suddenly and without transitions and development. Ancient astronaut proponents suggest that sites like the pyramids of Giza were instead constructed by extraterrestrials. However, archaeological evidence demonstrates not only the long cultural trajectory of prehistoric Egypt but also the developmental processes the ancient Egyptians underwent. Egyptian tombs began with important leaders of villages being buried in the bedrock and covered with mounds of earth. Eventually, the first pharaohs had tombs covered with single-story, mud-brick, square structures called mastabas. The stepped pyramid developed out of multiple mastabas being stacked on each one in one structure. This led to the construction of pharaoh Djoser's Step Pyramid at Saqqara, which is known from records to have been built by the ancient Egyptian architect and advisor Imhotep. It was pharaoh Sneferu who had his pyramid transitioned from a stepped to a true pyramid like the well-known pyramids of Giza. A papyrus document like a logbook kept by an official called inspector Merer has also been discovered with records of the construction of the Great Pyramid.

==== Moai ====
The Moai statues of Easter Island were moved miles from the Rano Raraku quarry to their current locations, and archaeologists have wondered how massive statues such as these could have been transported. The folklore of the native Rapa Nui people says that chiefs and priests used mana to make the statues of the island walk. In 1982, Czech engineer Pavel Pavel and a group of sixteen people used a replica concrete moai to test a method that could have transported the statues. They tied ropes to it and in two groups pulled and twisted it back and forth, making it move forward in a walking motion. They called it the "refrigerator method" and demonstrated that the massive statues could be easily moved by a small group of people.

=== Religious and cultural practices ===
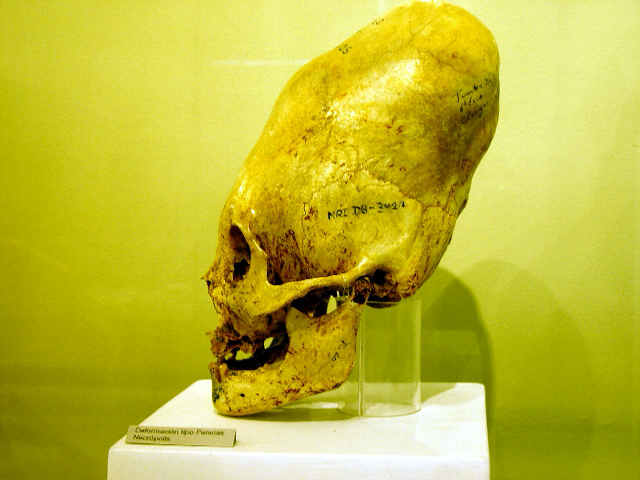
A physiologically manipulated Paracas skull (housed at the Museo Regional de Ica in Peru)

A number of ancient cultures, such as the ancient Egyptians and some Native Americans, artificially lengthened the skulls of their children. Some ancient astronaut proponents propose that this was done to emulate the extraterrestrial anatomy of their divine visitors.

==== Akhenaten ====
Among the ancient rulers depicted with elongated skulls are pharaoh Akhenaten and his wife Nefertiti. The depiction of Akhenaten and his family with traits like elongated skulls, limbs, underdeveloped torsos, and gynecomastia in Amarna art is hypothesized to be the effect of a familial disease. Marriage between family members, especially siblings, was common in ancient Egyptian royal families, elevating the risk of such disorders. Studies on the remains of the ruling family of 18th Dynasty Egypt have found evidence of deformities and illnesses. Proposed syndromes of Akhenaten include Loeys-Dietz syndrome, Marfan's syndrome, Frohlich syndrome, and Antley-Bixler syndrome. Akhenaten worshipped the sun disk god Aten and it is suggested that such worship could point to a disease that is alleviated by sunlight.

== In popular culture ==
Ancient astronauts have been addressed frequently in science fiction and horror fiction in many different media. In a 2004 article in Skeptic magazine, Jason Colavito writes that von Däniken borrowed many of the book's concepts from Le Matin des magiciens (Morning of the Magicians), that this book in turn was heavily influenced by the Cthulhu Mythos, and that the core of the ancient astronaut hypothesis originates in H. P. Lovecraft's works "The Call of Cthulhu" and At the Mountains of Madness. Colavito later expanded on this idea in his book The Cult of Alien Gods: H. P. Lovecraft and Extraterrestrial Pop Culture.

The idea that aliens visited Earth in the past is frequently seen in works of fiction. For example, the comic book Thor considers that all the Norse mythology is based on actual beings living in other dimensions, who were worshipped as gods by the Vikings and who reappear on Earth in modern times. Däniken's work, however, inspired several works and franchises over time, such as Eternals, Stargate, Indiana Jones and the Kingdom of the Crystal Skull, Prometheus and The X-Files. All those works do not take the idea seriously, but merely use it as a narrative device. Another angle may be to leave the aliens out of the story, and focus instead on devices they left behind, as in the novels Scarlet Dream, Galactic Derelict, World of Ptavvs, Toolmaker Koan, and A Fire Upon the Deep. Aliens may also appear as an elder race that created or shepherded humans in their early times; and may or may not be present in the work's present day.

Ancient Aliens is a television series that features proponents of the ancient astronaut hypothesis, such as Giorgio A. Tsoukalos, David Childress, Erich von Däniken, Steven M. Greer, and Nick Pope.

== Proponents ==
Many publications have argued for the ancient astronauts hypotheses. The following are notable examples:

- 1919: Charles Fort (book, The Book of the Damned)
- 1953: Desmond Leslie (book, Flying Saucers Have Landed)
- 1954: Harold T. Wilkins (book, Flying Saucers from the Moon)
- 1956: Morris K. Jessup (book, UFO and the Bible)
- 1957: Peter Kolosimo (book, Il pianeta sconosciuto – The Unknown Planet)
- 1957: Eric Frank Russell (book, Great World Mysteries)
- 1958: George Hunt Williamson (book, Secret Places of the Lion)
- 1958: Henri Lhote (book, The Search for the Tassili Frescoes: The story of the prehistoric rock-paintings of the Sahara)
- 1960: Jacques Bergier and Louis Pauwels (book, Le Matin des magiciens (The Morning of the Magicians))
- 1960: Brinsley Trench (book, The Sky People)
- 1961: Matest M. Agrest (article, The Astronauts of Yore)
- 1963: Robert Charroux (book, Histoire inconnue des hommes depuis 100.000 ans – One Hundred Thousand Years of Man's Unknown History)
- 1964: Peter Kolosimo (book, Terra senza tempo – Timeless Earth)
- 1964: W. Raymond Drake (book, Gods or Spacemen?)
- 1964: Robert Charroux (book, Legacy of the Gods)
- 1965: Paul Misraki (book, Flying Saucers Through The Ages)
- 1965: Robert Charroux (book, The Gods Unknown)
- 1967: Brad Steiger (book, The Flying Saucer Menace)
- 1967: John Michell (book, The Flying Saucer Vision)
- 1968: Erich von Däniken (book, Erinnerungen an die Zukunft: Ungelöste Rätsel der Vergangenheit, translated as Chariots of the Gods?)
- 1968: Barry Downing (book, The Bible and Flying Saucers)
- 1969: Robert Dione (book, God Drives a Flying Saucer)
- 1969: Jean Sendy (book, Those Gods Who Made Heaven and Earth; the novel of the Bible)
- 1969: Jacques Vallee (book, Passport to Magonia: From Folklore to Flying Saucers)
- 1970: John Keel (book, Operation Trojan Horse)
- 1972: T. C. Lethbridge (book, The Legend of the Sons of God: A Fantasy?)
- 1974: Charles Berlitz (book, The Bermuda Triangle)
- 1974: Josef F. Blumrich (book, Da tat sich der Himmel auf (The Spaceships of Ezekiel)
- 1974: Claude Vorilhon aka Rael (book, Le Livre Qui Dit La Vérité – The Book Which Tells the Truth)
- 1974: Robin Collyns (book, Did Spacemen Colonise the Earth?)
- 1975: Graham Cairns-Smith (a biochemist who suggested that the ancestors of humans might have had alien biochemistries and presented evidence to support this possibility in a biological research journal)
- 1975: Serge Hutin (book, Alien Races and Fantastic Civilizations)
- 1976: Robert K. G. Temple (book, The Sirius Mystery)
- 1976: John Baxter, Thomas Atkins (book, The Fire Came By: The Riddle of the Great Siberian Explosion)
- 1977: John Philip Cohane (book, Paradox: The Case for the Extraterrestrial Origin of Man)
- 1977: Warren Smith (book, UFO Trek)
- 1978: George Sassoon and Rodney Dale (book, Manna Machine)
- 1978: Zecharia Sitchin (book, The 12th planet)
- 1984: Salvador Freixedo, (book, ¡Defendámonos de los Dioses! – Spanish: Let Us Defend Ourselves from the Gods!)
- 1988: Salvador Freixedo, (book, La Granja Humana – Spanish: The Human Farm)
- 1988: Riley Martin (book, The Coming of Tan)
- 1989: Salvador Freixedo, (book, La Amenaza Extraterrestre – Spanish: The Alien Threat).
- 1993: David Icke (book, And the truth shall set you free)
- 1996: Alan F. Alford (book, Gods of the New Millennium)
- 1996: Murry Hope (book, The Sirius Connection: Unlocking the Secrets of Ancient Egypt)
- 1996: Richard C. Hoagland (book, The Monuments of Mars: A City on the Edge of Forever)
- 1998: Lloyd Pye (book, Everything You Know is Wrong – Book One: Human Evolution)
- 1998: James Herbert Brennan (book, Martian Genesis)
- 1999: David Hatcher Childress (book, Technology of the Gods, The Incredible Science of the Ancients)
- 1999: Laurence Gardner (book, Genesis of the Grail Kings: The Explosive Story of Genetic Cloning)
- 2003: Burak Eldem (book, 2012: Appointment With Marduk)
- 2009: Giorgio Tsoukalos et al. (TV, Ancient Aliens)

== See also ==
- Archaeoastronomy
- Vimana
- Elder race
- Extraterrestrial hypothesis
- First contact (science fiction)
- List of topics characterized as pseudoscience
- Panspermia
- Pseudoarchaeology
- Science fantasy
- Silurian hypothesis
- Xenoarchaeology
- In film:
  - 2001: A Space Odyssey
