= W. Raymond Drake =

British ufologist and author (1913–1989)

- Born: 1913
- Died: 1989 (aged 75–76)
- Occupation: Ufologist

Walter Raymond Drake (1913–1989) was a British disciple of Charles Fort and writer. He published nine books on the ancient astronaut theme, the first four years earlier than Erich von Däniken's bestseller Chariots of the Gods.

Drake proposed in his books that ancient civilizations were colonies of extraterrestrials who eventually lost their technological secrets and became indistinguishable from humans, and/or that many other ancient civilizations were the result of human contact with aliens. His claims are considered to be pseudohistory.

Drake spent many years digging through huge archives of material, looking in his case for supposed anomalies that could support his scenarios of space aliens impacting human history. As Drake himself said, "I aspired to collect as many facts as possible from ancient literature to chronicle for the past what Charles Fort has so brilliantly done for the present century." A slightly earlier British author somewhat comparable to Drake was Harold T. Wilkins.

Paperback editions of the first few of Drake's books were available in the US during the 1970s and became modest best-sellers in that format, often being displayed on news-stands next to the works of von Däniken.

== Books published ==
- Gods or Spacemen? (1964) ISBN 0-451-07192-1
- Gods and Spacemen in the Ancient East (1968)
- Mystery of the gods-- Are They Coming Back to Earth? (1972)
- The Ancient Secrets of Mysterious America-is Our Destiny Upon Us? (1973)
- Gods and Spacemen in the Ancient West (1974) ISBN 0-451-06055-5
- Gods and Spacemen in the Ancient Past (1975) ISBN 0-451-06140-3
- Gods and Spacemen Throughout History (1975) ISBN 0-85435-332-1
- Gods and Spacemen in Greece and Rome (1976) ISBN 0-451-07620-6
- Gods and Spacemen in Ancient Israel (1976) ISBN 0-7221-3034-1
- Messengers from the Stars (1977)
- Cosmic Continents (1986)
