= Serge Hutin =

Serge Hutin (1927 – 1 November 1997) was a French author of books on esoterica and the occult. He was born in France.

== Writer ==
Hutin was a writer of many books on the occult and esoteric, he wrote about Freemasonry, secret societies, Rosicrucianism, alchemy and astrology and many other occult topics. Hutin wrote about the Kabbalah and claimed that Isaac Newton was a Christian Kabbalist.

Hutin is most well known in UFO circles for his ancient astronaut book called Alien Races and Fantastic Civilizations (1975) in which he claimed ancient civilizations across the earth were colonial outposts built by extraterrestrials. The book was similar to books by other authors of the time such as Jacques Bergier and Jean Sendy. Hutin also wrote about Atlantis and gave a lot of credit to Plato for writing about it.

== List of works ==
Hutin published over 40 books (The following are ones which have been translated into English):

- History of the Rosicrucians (1959)
- World history of secret societies (1959)
- The Freemasons (1960)
- Paracelsus: the man, the physician, the alchemist (1966)
- A History of Alchemy - Ancient Science of Changing Common Metals Into Gold (1971)
- Robert Fludd (1972)
- Alien Races and Fantastic Civilizations (1975) ISBN 0-425-02769-4
- Casting spells (1978)
- History of astrology (1986)
- Nostradamus and alchemy (1988)
- Invisible government and secret societies
- The Prophecies of Nostradamus

== See also ==
- Robert Fludd
- Nostradamus
