= Barry Downing =

Barry Downing (also known as B. H. Downing), born 1938 in Syracuse, New York, is a Presbyterian minister and ancient astronaut proponent. His book The Bible and Flying Saucers in 1968, claims UFO phenomena are responsible for many of the events in the Bible.

== Life and career ==
Downing holds a PhD in the relation between religion and science from the University of Edinburgh of Scotland. He also has a B.A in physics from Hartwick College, and a degree from Princeton Theological Seminary. In 2008 he served as a delegate from Princeton Theological Seminary to the Inauguration of Margaret Drugovich as the 10th President of Hartwick College. He was pastor of the Northminster Presbyterian Church in Endwell, New York. At Edinburgh, Downing studied under Prof. John McIntyre, and Prof. Thomas F. Torrance; his dissertation, Eschatological Implications of the Understanding of Time and Space in the Thought of Isaac Newton, was accepted in 1966. He is listed in Who's Who in Theology and Science, as well as in The Encyclopedia of Extraterrestrial Encounters. He has served as a consultant in theology to the Mutual UFO Network (MUFON) since 1972, and is on the international board of directors of the Fund for UFO Research (FUFOR).

== The Bible and Flying Saucers ==
Downing wrote the book The Bible and Flying Saucers in 1968 in which he stated that Jesus was an extraterrestrial sent to earth to rid the world of sin and wickedness. He cited biblical lines such as Jesus was from another world (John 8: 23) to support his claims, Downing also believed that Jesus left earth in a flying saucer to another planet or perhaps another spatial dimension. In the book, Downing also claimed that angels from the Bible were actually aliens and that the "angelic aliens" spoke to Moses on Mount Sinai where he boarded a UFO to receive the Tablets of Stone, and specifications for the construction of the Tabernacle.

According to Downing, aliens spoke to Elijah and guided the ancient Israelites, providing them with manna in the wilderness. Downing also claimed in the book that a flying vehicle operated by intelligent alien beings was responsible for the parting of the Red Sea.

== Recent years ==
In 2009, Downing appeared in a History Channel television series called Ancient Aliens.

== See also ==
- Robert Dione
- Paul Misraki
