= Alan F. Alford =

British writer

Alan F. Alford (1961 – 14 November 2011) was a British writer and speaker on the subjects of ancient religion, mythology, and Egyptology.

His first book Gods of the New Millennium (1996) drew on the ancient astronaut theory of Zecharia Sitchin and became a number 11 non-fiction bestseller in the UK. In his subsequent writings, however, he admitted to serious faults in his use of Sitchin's theory and proposed an alternative, cataclysm theory of ancient myth: "I am now firmly of the opinion that these gods personified the falling sky; in other words, the descent of the gods was a poetic rendition of the cataclysm myth which stood at the heart of ancient Near Eastern religions."

Alford's recent work focuses on the importance of the creation myth in ancient Egyptian religion.

== Biography ==
Born in 1961, Alan Alford was educated at King Edward VI School in Southampton, England and gained a degree in commerce from the University of Birmingham in 1982. He became a qualified chartered accountant in 1985, while training with Arthur Young Chartered Accountants in Southampton. He pursued a career in industry, working for McCarthy & Stone plc, Flight Refuelling plc, and South Staffordshire Water plc (during this time he gained an MBA from the University of Coventry). He left the latter company in 1995, and began a new career as a writer.

== Books ==
- Gods of the New Millennium, Hodder & Stoughton, 1997; first published by Eridu Books, 1996.
- The Phoenix Solution, Hodder & Stoughton, 1998.
- When the Gods Came Down, Hodder and Stoughton, 2000.
- The Atlantis Secret, Eridu Books, 2001, trade paperback edition.
- Pyramid of Secrets, Eridu Books, 2003, trade paperback edition
- The Midnight Sun, Eridu Books, 2004, trade paperback edition.

== Retraction of ancient astronaut theories ==
In Gods of the New Millennium (1996 & 1997), Alford drew the attention of the British public to the theories of the ancient astronaut writer Zecharia Sitchin. The book was a commercial success. However, less than two years later, Alford began to contradict his mentor by arguing that the gods personified the explosion of a heavenly planet which had shaped the creation of the earth.

Alford's doubts about Sitchin's theory emerged while reading the Pyramid Texts as research for his book The Phoenix Solution (1998). In so doing, he found little evidence to support the ancient astronaut theory, but rather found correspondences between the Egyptian myths and the 'exploded planet hypothesis' of the American astronomer Tom Van Flandern. Alford affirms that the key to his U-turn was the realisation that "the gods personified the cataclysmic powers of creation". This led Alford to begin his own investigation of the Mesopotamian mythological texts. The result was When The Gods Came Down (2000), in which he refined and extended his cataclysmic theory of myth while penning a hard-hitting rebuttal of the ancient astronaut interpretation. Coinciding with the publication of this book, Alford published on his website an extensive 'Self-critique' of his first book Gods of the New Millennium. At this time also the paperback edition of GOTNM began to carry a new foreword in which the author expressed his reservations about chapters 6 to 16.

In The Atlantis Secret (2003), Alford attacked the Euhemerist and Von Daniken theories of myth, arguing that the Greek gods were not deified heroes or astronauts but personifications of cataclysmic events from the beginning of the world. As for the ancient belief that the gods had granted the gifts of civilisation to man – a myth commonly cited by ancient astronaut writers – this was a natural extension of the 'birth from the earth' myths which were popular in ancient times.

== Exploded planet hypothesis of myth ==
In When The Gods Came Down, Alford extended the scope of his study to Mesopotamian and biblical mythology. In this book, he separated his own exploded planet hypothesis of myth from Van Flandern's exploded planet hypothesis of science. He argued that the Sumerian religion had been an 'exploded planet cult' and that its central myth had been encoded in tales of the gods coming down from the sky – of the deluge and the creation of man – of the wars between gods of heaven and earth – and of the sacred marriage of the god and the goddess. One of his most controversial claims was that the story of the crucifixion and resurrection of Jesus Christ allegorised the fate of the heavenly planet, and that Jesus in all probability never existed unless as the lead actor in an ancient Passion play.

In The Atlantis Secret, Alford underlined the importance of cataclysms in ancient Greek myth and suggested that the Greek gods had inherited many characteristics from the older Mesopotamian deities. He cautioned, however, that the ancients' belief in exploded planets did not require an actual explosion. Instead, he drew on the work of Victor Clube and Bill Napier to suggest that comets, fireballs and meteorites had been closely observed at the dawn of civilisation, and that the ancient sages had deduced an exploded planet, correctly or incorrectly, from first principles; the sages had then attributed the great cataclysm to the beginning of time. There is an implied criticism of Velikovsky's historicist interpretation of cataclysm myths.

Critics of Alford's theory say that it is atheistic, that planets do not explode, or that the ancients did not even understand the concept of a planet. More pertinent are the critics who suggest he is wrong to see the exploded planet as a monolithic explanation of all myth.

== Atlantis theory ==
In The Atlantis Secret (2003), Alford criticised historicist interpretations of Plato's Atlantis story and asserted that Atlantis never existed in a geographical sense. In keeping with recent Platonic scholarship, he took the story to be political allegory, based on Plato's critical view of Athens' status as a powerful but decadent maritime empire in the 5th century BC. But he argued that the story was simultaneously an allegory for the creation of the universe – following the geocentric cosmogony of the Greeks. In this way, he claimed that the story was indeed "true" – as Plato insisted it was – for the ancient sages believed that the myth of creation was a true account of how the universe had been brought into being.

The details of Alford's theory are as follows: that Atlantis was a metaphor for the primeval underworld (the interior of the earth); that the invasion of the known world by Atlantis allegorised the eruption of the underworld; and that Ancient Athens represented the ideal city – an archetypal and metaphorical 'city' – which fell from the sky and defeated Atlantis by breaking into the underworld.

While much of Alford's interpretation hinges on known parallels in Greek myth, for example Hesiod's tale of the battle between the gods and the Titans, the key to his theory is his exploration of parallels between Greek and Near Eastern myths. Drawing upon the recent work of scholars such as Walter Burkert, Martin West, and Charles Penglase, Alford suggests that the Greek poets and philosophers borrowed from their Near Eastern neighbours mythical ideas such as: the birth of the universe in a cataclysm; the fall of the sky; the lowering of 'cities' from heaven to earth; the fall of the golden age; the wars of the gods of heaven and the underworld; the fall of gods, islands and continents from heaven into the underworld or subterranean sea; the birth of all things from the earth or subterranean sea; and the idea that mythical peoples dwelt in heaven, the earth and the underworld.

Alford's theory has been attacked by supporters of a historical Atlantis. A classical scholar welcomed his approach and complimented his efforts to elucidate the story from a mythological perspective, while remaining cautious about the 'exploded planet hypothesis' for the myth of the falling sky.

== Ideas on ancient Egyptian religion ==
In his book The Midnight Sun, Alford drew on the work of J.P. Allen to elucidate the 'physics' of the ancient Egyptian creation myth. He argued, following Allen, that the creation myth provided a coherent and consistent account of the creation of the cosmos, albeit on a geocentric view, and accordingly proposed a central role for this myth in our understanding of ancient Egyptian religion. He further argued, contra Allen and others, that the sun-god was secondary to the creator-god in Egypt, being tasked (alongside the pharaoh) with re-enacting the creation myth in order that the cosmic order (ma'at) be made to endure for ever. Alford thus held that the traditional cults of Egyptian religion were facets of a unifying 'cult of creation'.

In keeping with this creational view of Egyptian religion, Alford is a sceptic of the orthodox solar interpretation of obelisks and pyramids. He maintains that these monuments commemorated the creation of the cosmos, the benben stone at the apex representing the seed of the creator-god which had been raised from the earth into the sky.

Alford has also proposed that the Pyramid Texts – such a puzzle to scholars – make sense as a ritualistic re-enactment of the events of creation, in which the king played the part of the creator-god and hence emerged from the earth into all parts of the cosmos.

== Theories on the Great Pyramid ==
In the late 90s Alford believed that the great pyramid was not created by the Egyptian but by a different civilization. In an interview he said that "In a nutshell, the Great Pyramid is of an entirely different ilk to the other pyramids in Egypt. Its build quality is totally superior. Its design is radically different. And its dimensions – as a scaled down hemisphere of the Earth – bespeak a scientific rather than a religious purpose. All this suggests that the Great Pyramid was built by an entirely different culture – in my view an earlier, pre-dynastic culture".

Alford takes as his starting point the golden rule that the pharaoh had to be buried in the earth, i.e. at ground level or below, and this leads him to conclude that Khufu was interred in an ingeniously concealed cave whose entrance is today sealed up in the so-called Well Shaft adjacent to a known cave called the Grotto. He has lobbied the Egyptian authorities to explore this area of the pyramid with ground penetrating radar, and although nothing has happened yet it is quite possible that one day this theory will be put to the test.

The cult of creation theory also provides the basis for Alford's next big idea: that the sarcophagus in the King's Chamber – commonly supposed to be Khufu's final resting place – actually enshrined iron meteorites. He maintains, by reference to the Pyramid Texts, that this iron was blasted into the sky at the time of creation, according to the Egyptians' geocentric way of thinking. The King's Chamber, with its upward inclined dual 'airshafts', was built to capture the magic of this mythical moment.

The rest of the Pyramid is interpreted by Alford as a network of secret chambers in which religious relics were concealed – hence the title of his book Pyramid of Secrets. This is the weakest part of his case, as the textual support for the idea is thin and there is no way of knowing what might have been contained in the chambers that we know of today. Once again, Alford's theory can be proven or negated by future exploration, since it is central to his case that further secret chambers exist. In this regard, his thoughts are guided by the scholar J.P. Lepre, who claimed that anomalous patterns in the Pyramid's masonry joints might be signs to the existence of hidden passages and chambers.

Alford's most speculative idea is that the King's Chamber generated low frequency sound via its 'airshafts', the purpose being to re-enact the sound of the earth splitting open at the time of creation. This theory is an attempt to explain the builders' use of stacked roofs with enormous granite beams above the chamber's ceiling. Egyptologists, however, do not see a mystery in these roofs and would therefore reject this as an unnecessary hypothesis.

== See also ==
- Ancient Aliens
- Ancient astronauts
- Chariots of the Gods?
- David Icke
- Dogon people
- Extraterrestrial hypothesis
- Giorgio A. Tsoukalos
- Murry Hope
- Robert K. G. Temple
- The Sirius Mystery
- Zecharia Sitchin

== Further reading and external links ==
- Author's Official Website
- Tom Van Flandern's Website
- Ancient Astronauts Website
- Sceptics Website
