= Zecharia Sitchin =

Author of ancient astronaut books (1920–2010)

- Born: July 11, 1920; Baku, Azerbaijan Soviet Socialist Republic (present-day Azerbaijan)
- Died: October 9, 2010 (aged 90); New York City, U.S.
- Known for: Fringe theories
- Website: www.sitchin.com

Zecharia Sitchin (July 11, 1920 – October 9, 2010) was an Azerbaijani-born author of a number of books proposing an explanation for human origins involving ancient astronauts. Sitchin attributed the creation of the ancient Sumerian culture to the Anunnaki, which he claimed was a race of extraterrestrials from a planet beyond Neptune called Nibiru. He claimed that Sumerian mythology suggests that this hypothetical planet of Nibiru is in an elongated, 3,600-year-long elliptical orbit around the Sun. Sitchin's books have sold millions of copies worldwide and have been translated into more than 25 languages.

Sitchin's ideas have been resoundingly rejected by scientists, academics, historians (including Sumerologists, Orientalists and Assyriologists) and anthropologists who dismiss his work as pseudoscience and pseudohistory. His work has been criticized for flawed methodology, ignoring archaeological and historical evidence, and mistranslations of ancient texts as well as for incorrect astronomical and scientific claims.

== Early life ==
Zecharia Sitchin was born to a Jewish family in Baku on July 11, 1920, which was then part of the Azerbaijan Soviet Socialist Republic (in 1922 it would become part of the Soviet Union), and was raised in Mandatory Palestine. According to an interview in the New York Times he received a degree in economics from the University of London, and was an editor and journalist in Israel before moving to New York in 1952. While working as an executive for a shipping company, he taught himself Sumerian cuneiform and visited several archaeological sites.

== Ideas and works ==
Similar to earlier authors such as Immanuel Velikovsky and Erich von Däniken, Sitchin advocated hypotheses in which extraterrestrial events supposedly played a significant role in ancient human history.

According to Sitchin's interpretation of Mesopotamian iconography and symbolism, outlined in his 1976 book The 12th Planet and its sequels, there is an undiscovered planet beyond Neptune that follows a long, southern tilted elliptical orbit (he also indicated that part of its orbit is to the north of Earth's equator), reaching the inner Solar System roughly every 3,600 years. This planet is called Nibiru (although Jupiter was the planet associated with the god Marduk in Babylonian cosmology). According to Sitchin, Nibiru (whose name was replaced with MARDUK in original legends by the Babylonian ruler of the same name in an attempt to co-opt the creation for himself), a former rogue planet that was captured shortly after the formation of the Solar System, collided catastrophically with Tiamat (a goddess in the Babylonian creation myth the Enûma Eliš), which he considers to be another planet once located between Mars and Jupiter. This collision supposedly formed the planet Earth, the asteroid belt, and the comets. Sitchin states that when struck by one of planet Nibiru's moons, Tiamat split in two, and then on a second pass Nibiru itself struck the broken fragments and one half of Tiamat became the asteroid belt. The second half, struck again by one of Nibiru's moons, was pushed into a new orbit and became today's planet Earth. Sitchin also speculated that Pluto (which he identifies as both Gaga and Isimud) was originally a satellite of Saturn but Nibiru's gravity perturbed it, sending it to the outer Solar System and giving the body its peculiar orbital path, intersecting the orbit of Neptune.

According to Sitchin, Nibiru (called "the twelfth planet" because, Sitchin claimed, the Sumerians' gods-given conception of the Solar System counted all eight planets, plus Pluto, the Sun and the Moon) was the home of a technologically advanced human-like extraterrestrial race called the Anunnaki in Sumerian myth, who Sitchin states are called the Nephilim in Genesis. He wrote that they evolved after Nibiru entered the inner Solar System, and they first arrived on Earth probably 450,000 years ago, looking for minerals, especially gold, which they found and mined in Africa. Sitchin states that these "gods" were the rank-and-file workers of the colonial expedition to Earth from planet Nibiru.

According to Sitchin, Enki (the Sumerian god of water and human culture) suggested that to relieve the Anunnaki, who had mutinied over their dissatisfaction with their working conditions, that primitive workers (Homo sapiens) be created by genetic engineering as slaves to replace them in the gold mines by crossing extraterrestrial genes with those of Homo erectus. According to Sitchin, ancient inscriptions report that the human civilization in Sumer, Mesopotamia, was set up under the guidance of these "gods", and human kingship was inaugurated to provide intermediaries between mankind and the Anunnaki (creating the "divine right of kings" doctrine). Sitchin believes that fallout from nuclear weapons, used during a war between factions of the extraterrestrials, is the "evil wind" described in the Lament for Ur that destroyed Ur around 2000 BCE. Sitchin states the exact year is 2024 BCE. Sitchin says that his research coincides with many biblical texts, and that biblical texts come originally from Sumerian writings.

== Influence ==
Since the release of his first book The 12th Planet in 1976, Sitchin has written seven other books as part of his Earth Chronicles series, as well as six other companion books. Sitchin's books have sold millions of copies worldwide and have been published in more than 25 languages. New York Times reporter Corey Kilgannon has noted that despite academic dismissal of his work, Sitchin has "a devoted following of readers".

Critic Michael S. Heiser has called Sitchin "arguably the most important proponent of the ancient astronaut hypothesis over the last several decades". Sitchin was a frequent guest on the Coast to Coast AM radio show, which in 2010 presented Sitchin with a lifetime achievement award. Gods of the New Millennium author Alan F. Alford admits he initially became "infatuated" with Sitchin's hypotheses but later became a critic of Sitchin's interpretations of myth.

According to some writers, Sitchin's ideas, along with those of Erich von Däniken, may have influenced the beliefs of the religious sect of Raëlism, and writer Mark Pilkington sees the mythology of Japan's Pana Wave religious group as rooted in Sitchin's The 12th Planet and its sequels.

The 1994 movie Stargate, directed by Roland Emmerich, and the 2009 video game The Conduit drew some conceptual inspiration from Sitchin's ideas, while screenwriter Roberto Orci says the villains of the film Cowboys & Aliens were inspired by Sitchin's conceptualization of the Anunnaki as gold-mining aliens.

In 2016, Kazem Finjan, the Iraqi Minister of Transport, claimed at a press conference that Sumerians had built and used an airport in the Dhi Qar Governorate to launch spaceships 5000 years ago. He cited the work of Sitchin and others to support his assertion.

== Criticisms ==
Criticism of Sitchin's work falls primarily into three categories: translations and interpretations of ancient texts, astronomical and scientific observations, and literalism of myth.

=== Translations and interpretations ===
When Sitchin wrote his books, only specialists could read the Sumerian language. However, sources such as the 2006 book Sumerian Lexicon have made the language more accessible to non-experts.

American biblical scholar Michael S. Heiser states he has found many inaccuracies in Sitchin's translations and challenges interested parties to use this book to check their validity. Prof. Ronald H. Fritze, author of the book Invented Knowledge: False History, Fake Science and Pseudo-religions, mentions the example of Sitchin's claim that the Sumerian sign DIĜIR means "pure ones of the blazing rockets", adding that "Sitchin's assignment of meanings to ancient words is tendentious and frequently strained." Fritze also commented on Sitchin's methodology, writing that "When critics have checked Sitchin's references, they have found that he frequently quotes out of context or truncates his quotes in a way that distorts evidence in order to prove his contentions. Evidence is presented selectively and contradictory evidence is ignored."

Sitchin bases his arguments on his personal interpretations of Egyptian and Sumerian texts, and the seal VA 243. Sitchin wrote that these ancient civilizations knew of twelve planets, when in fact they only knew five. Hundreds of Sumerian astronomical seals and calendars have been decoded and recorded, and the total count of planets on each seal has been five. Seal VA 243 has 12 dots that Sitchin identifies as planets. When translated, seal VA 243 reads "You're his servant" which is now thought to be a message from a nobleman to a servant. According to Heiser, the so-called sun on Seal VA 243 is not the Sumerian symbol for the sun but is a star, and the dots are also stars. The symbol on seal VA 243 has no resemblance to the hundreds of documented Sumerian sun symbols.

In a 1979 review of The Twelfth Planet, Roger W. Wescott, Professor of Anthropology and Linguistics at Drew University, Madison, New Jersey, noted Sitchin's amateurishness with respect to the primacy of the Sumerian language:

Sitchin's linguistics seems at least as amateurish as his anthropology, biology, and astronomy. On p. 370, for example, he maintains that "all the ancient languages ... including early Chinese ... stemmed from one primeval source -- Sumerian". Sumerian, of course, is the virtual archetype of what linguistic taxonomists call a language-isolate, meaning a language that does not fall into any of the well-known language-families or exhibit clear cognation with any known language. Even if Sitchin is referring to written rather than to spoken language, it is unlikely that his contention can be persuasively defended, since Sumerian ideograms were preceded by the Azilian and Tartarian signaries of Europe as well as by a variety of script-like notational systems between the Nile and Indus rivers.

=== Astronomical and scientific observations ===
Sitchin's "planetary collision" hypothesis does superficially resemble one suggested by modern astronomers—the giant impact hypothesis of the Moon's formation about 4.5 billion years ago by a body impacting with the newly formed Earth. However, Sitchin's proposed series of rogue planetary collisions differ in both details and timing. As with Immanuel Velikovsky's earlier Worlds in Collision thesis, Sitchin states that he has found evidence of ancient human knowledge of rogue celestial motions in a variety of mythological accounts. In Velikovsky's case, these interplanetary collisions were supposed to have taken place within the span of human existence, whereas for Sitchin these occurred during the early stages of planetary formation, but entered the mythological account passed down via the alien race which purportedly evolved on Nibiru after these encounters.

According to former Immanuel Velikovsky assistant turned prolific critic, C. Leroy Ellenberger, "[Sitchin states that] from an equal start, the Nephilim evolved on Nibiru 45 million years ahead of comparable development on Earth with its decidedly more favorable environment. Such an outcome is unlikely, to say the least, since Nibiru would spend over 99% of its time beyond Pluto. Sitchin's explanation that heat from radioactive decay and a thick atmosphere keep Nibiru warm is absurd and does not address the problem of darkness in deep space. Also unexplained is how the Nephilim, who evolved long after Nibiru arrived, knew what happened when Nibiru first entered the solar system."

The scenario outlined by Sitchin, with Nibiru returning to the inner Solar System regularly every 3,600 years,

... implies an orbit with a semi-major axis of 235 astronomical units, extending from the asteroid belt to twelve times farther beyond the sun than Pluto. Elementary perturbation theory indicates that, under the most favorable circumstances of avoiding close encounters with other planets, no body with such an eccentric orbit would keep the same period for two consecutive passages. Within twelve orbits the object would be either ejected or converted to a short period object. Thus, the failed search for a trans-Plutonian planet by T.C. Van Flandern, of the U.S. Naval Observatory, which Sitchin uses to bolster his thesis, is no support at all.

Sitchin in "the case of Adam's alien genes" states that 223 genes found by the Human Genome Sequencing Consortium are without the required predecessors on the genomic evolutionary tree. Later researchers have argued that the conclusion from the Human Genome Sequencing Consortium cannot be drawn due to a lack of a comprehensive gene database for comparison. An analysis by Salzberg identified 40 potential genes laterally transferred into the genome from prokaryotic organisms. Salzberg also argues that gene loss combined with sample size effects and evolutionary rate variation provide an alternative, more biologically plausible explanation.

=== Literalism of myth ===
Peter James, co-author of the controversial book Centuries of Darkness, has criticized Sitchin both for ignoring the world outside Mesopotamia and more specifically for wholly misunderstanding Sumerian, Assyrian and Babylonian literature:

He uses the Epic of Creation Enuma Elish as the foundation for his cosmogony, identifying the young god Marduk, who overthrows the older regime of gods and creates the Earth, as the unknown "Twelfth Planet". In order to do this he interprets the Assyrio-Babylonian theogony as a factual account of the birth of the other "eleven" planets. The Babylonian names for the planets are established beyond a shadow of a doubt—Ishtar was the deity of Venus, Nergal of Mars, and Marduk of Jupiter—and confirmed by hundreds of astronomical/astrological tables and treatises on clay tablets and papyri from the Hellenistic period. Sitchin merrily ignores all this and assigns unwarranted planetary identities to the gods mentioned in the theogony. For example, Apsu, attested as god of the primeval waters, becomes, of all things, the Sun! Ea, as it suits Sitchin, is sometimes planet Neptune and sometimes a spaceman. And the identity of Ishtar as the planet Venus, a central feature of Mesopotamian religion, is nowhere mentioned in the book—instead Sitchin arbitrarily assigns to Venus another deity from Enuma Elish, and reserves Ishtar for a role as a female astronaut.

William Irwin Thompson comments on what he calls Sitchin's 'literalism':

What Sitchin sees is what he needs for his hypothesis. So figure 15 on page 40 is radiation therapy, and figure 71 on page 136 is a god inside a rocket-shaped chamber. If these are gods, why are they stuck with our cheap B movie technology of rockets, microphones, space-suits, and radiation therapy? If they are gods, then why can't they have some really divine technology such as intradimensional worm-hole travel, antigravity, starlight propulsion, or black hole bounce rematerializations? Sitchin has constructed what appears to be a convincing argument, but when he gets close to single images on ancient tablets, he falls back into the literalism of "Here is an image of the gods in rockets." Suddenly, ancient Sumer is made to look like the movie set for Destination Moon. Erich Von Däniken's potboiler Chariots of the Gods? has the same problem. Nazca plains in Peru is turned into a World War II landing strip. The gods can cross galactic distances, but by the time they get to Peru, their spaceships are imagined as World War II prop jobs that need an enormous landing strip. This literalization of the imagination doesn't make any sense, but every time it doesn't, you hear Sitchin say "There can be no doubt, but ..."

== Bibliography ==
=== Earth Chronicles volumes ===
1. The 12th Planet, 1976, Stein and Day, ISBN 0-8128-1939-X
2. The Stairway to Heaven, 1980, St. Martin's Press, ISBN 0-312-75505-8
3. The Wars of Gods and Men, 1985, Avon Books, ISBN 0-380-89585-4
4. The Lost Realms, 1990, Avon Books, ISBN 0-380-75890-3
5. When Time Began, 1993, Avon Books, ISBN 0-380-77071-7
6. The Cosmic Code, 1998, Avon Books, ISBN 0-380-80157-4
7. The End of Days: Armageddon and Prophecies of the Return, 2007, William Morrow, ISBN 978-0-06-123823-9

=== Companion volumes ===
1. Genesis Revisited: Is Modern Science Catching Up With Ancient Knowledge?, 1990, Avon Books, ISBN 0-380-76159-9
2. Divine Encounters: A Guide to Visions, Angels and Other Emissaries, 1995, Avon Books, ISBN 0-380-78076-3
3. The Earth Chronicles Handbook, 2009, Bear & Company, ISBN 978-1-59143-101-5
4. There Were Giants Upon the Earth: Gods, Demigods, and Human Ancestry: The Evidence of Alien DNA, 2010, Bear & Company, ISBN 978-1-59143-121-3

=== Earth Chronicles expeditions ===
1. The Earth Chronicles Expeditions, 2004, Bear & Company, ISBN 978-1-59143-076-6
2. Journeys to the Mythical Past, 2007, Bear and Company, ISBN 978-1-59143-080-3

=== Novels ===
- The Lost Book of Enki: Memoirs and Prophecies of an Extraterrestrial god, 2001, Bear & Company, ISBN 1-879181-83-5
- The King Who Refused to Die: The Anunnaki and The Search for Immortality, 2013, Bear & Company, ISBN 978-1-59143-177-0

=== Associated ===
- The Complete Earth Chronicles, 2014, Bear & Company, ISBN 978-1591432012 (Box set of first seven books)
- The Anunnaki Chronicles: A Zecharia Sitchin Reader, 2015, Bear & Company, ISBN 978-1-59143-229-6 (edited, Janet Sitchin)

=== DVDs ===
- Are We Alone in the Universe? (based on Genesis Revisited), documentary, 1978 (2003 DVD release)
- An Evening with Zecharia Sitchin, lecture and slide presentation, 1997
- A Talk From The Heart! lecture and slide presentation, 2006
- Signs of the Return, lecture and slide presentation, 2009
- 2012—the End of Days? lecture and slide presentation, 2010
- Zecharia at 90—Farewell Address, lecture, 2010

== See also ==
- Erich von Däniken
- Extraterrestrial hypothesis
- Giorgio A. Tsoukalos
- Mauro Biglino
- Mesopotamian mythology
- Murry Hope
- Robert K. G. Temple
- Sumerian literature
