= Salvador Freixedo =

Spanish ufologist

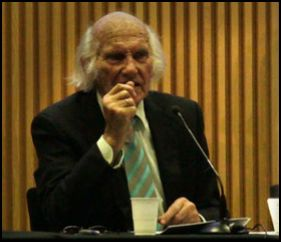
- Born: Salvador Freixedo Tabarés; 18 April 1923; O Carballiño, Ourense Province, Galicia, Spain
- Died: 25 October 2019 (aged 95–96)
- Education: Salamanca, Universidad de Comillas, Alma College, Mont Laurier, University of Los Angeles, Fordham University
- Occupations: Ufologist; parapsychologist; author; priest
- Known for: Ufology, Ancient astronauts, Catholic priest (Jesuit order)
- Spouse: Magdalena del Amo

Salvador Freixedo (18 April 1923 – 25 October 2019) was a Spanish Catholic priest and a member of the Jesuit order. A ufologist and researcher of paranormal subjects, he wrote a number of books on the relationship between religion and extraterrestrial beings, and was a speaker in several international UFO congresses in Europe, the Americas, and Asia. He was also a contributor to a number of parascientific magazines, such as Mundo Desconocido (Unknown World), Karma 7 and Más allá (Beyond) among others. He also appeared in a number of TV and radio shows dedicated to these subjects.

== Biography ==
Freixedo was born in O Carballiño (Ourense Province, Galicia, Spain), in 1923, into a deeply religious family (his brother was a Jesuit and his sister was a nun). When he was five his family moved to Ourense, and it is there where he started his first studies, attending primary school at the Saint Vincent Paul Nuns and Secondary School at the Institute Otero Pedrayo. At the age of 16 he joined the Jesuit Order and was ordained a priest in 1953, in Santander, Spain. He was a member of the Jesuit Order for thirty years.

He lived in a number of countries in America from 1947. In his role as a Jesuit, he taught History of the Church in the Interdiocese Seminary of Santo Domingo, and he founded the Movement of the Christian Working Youth in San Juan, Puerto Rico. He was the national vice-assessor of this movement in La Habana.

He studied humanities in Salamanca, philosophy in Universidad de Comillas (Santander), theology in Alma College in San Francisco (California), ascetics in Mont Laurier (Canada), and psychology in the University of Los Angeles (California) and in Fordham University of New York City.

Since the 1950s, his critical position on the postures of the Catholic Church and the publication of some books led him to jail and to the expulsion from countries like Cuba and Venezuela, and also to his exclusion from the Jesuit Order in 1969.

Since the 1970s he had dedicated himself to research in the field of parapsychology, in particular the UFO phenomenon and its relation to religion and human history. He had published a number of books on the subject, and founded the Mexican Institute of Paranormal Studies, of which he presided over the First Great International Congress..

== Literary works ==
=== 1950 to 1970 ===
- In 1957 while he was in Cuba, he wrote his first book: 40 Cases of Social Injustice. Due to pressure from the Batista government he was transferred to Puerto Rico in 1958.
- In 1968, while in Puerto Rico, he wrote My Church Sleeps in which he stated the Church was narrow-minded and denounced what he saw as the poor evangelical spirit of some of its leaders and what he believed to be the irrationality of some of its dogmas, for which he was excluded from the Jesuit Order. In Spain his book was banned.
- In 1970 his book Love, Sex, Courtship, Marriage, Children: Five Realities in Evolution (Religious myths in human relations) surfaced in Venezuela. He was jailed and subsequently expelled from the country.

=== 1970 to 2012 ===
From the time of his falling away with the Order, he dedicated himself to the study of paranormal phenomena, considering it a window to other realities and other dimensions of existence. He has published over thirty books, many discussing a possible relationship between religion and extraterrestrials, such as:

- Extraterrestres y creencias religiosas – cuando los OVNIs aterrizan los dogmas vuelan (1971) (Spanish: Extraterrestrials and Religious Beliefs – When UFOs Land, Dogmas Fly)
- El diabólico inconsciente – Parapsicología y Religión (1973) (Spanish: The Diabolical Subconscious – Parapsychology and Religion)
- Visionarios, místicos y contactos extraterrestres (La religión en la parasicología y OVNIs) (1977) (Spanish: Seers, Mystics, and Extraterrestrial Contact – The religion among parapsychology and UFOs)
- Israel, pueblo contacto (1978) (Spanish: Israel: Contact People)
- 60 casos de OVNIS (Spanish: 60 UFO Cases)
- ¿Por qué agoniza el Cristianismo? (1983) (Spanish: Why is Christianity Dying?)
- Diccionario sulfúrico (Spanish: Sulfuric Dictionary)
- Curanderismo y Curaciones por la Fe (1983) (Spanish: Witch-doctors and Healings by Faith)
- ¡Defendámonos de los dioses! (1984) (Spanish: Defending Ourselves from the Gods!)
- Las apariciones de El Escorial (Las Apariciones Marianas) (1985) (Spanish: The Apparitions of El Escorial – The Marian Apparitions)
- Religión, política y microcefália (Spanish: Religion, Politics, and Microcephaly)
- El Cristianismo: un mito más (1986) (Spanish: Christianity, Just Another Myth)
- Los curanderos (1987) (Spanish: The Witch-doctors)
- La granja humana (Ellos, los dueños invisibles de este planeta) (1988) (Spanish: The Human Farm; They, the invisible owners of this planet)
- La amenaza extraterrestre (1989) (Spanish: The Alien Threat)
- Interpelación a Jesús de Nazaret (1989) (Spanish: Interpellation to Jesus of Nazareth)
- Apariciones religiosas : mito o realidad?; una explicación a fenómenos como el de Villa Alemana (1989) (Spanish: Religious Apparitions, Myth or Reality?; an explanation of phenomena such as the one of German Village)
- Los contactados (1991) (Spanish: The Contactees)
- Los hijos de la Nueva Era (1992) (Spanish: The Children of the New Era)
- Los OVNIS, ¿una amenaza para la humanidad? (1992) (Spanish: UFOs, a threat for humanity?)
- Biografía del fenómeno OVNI (1992) (Spanish: Biography of the UFO Phenomenon)
- ¿Qué son los OVNIS? (1993) (Spanish: What Are UFOs?)
- Fenómeno OVNI: Evidencias (1993) (Spanish: UFO Phenomenon, Evidence)
- En los límites del universo (1994) (Spanish: Among the Limits of the Universe)
- OVNIS y dioses depredadores (1995) (Spanish: UFOs and Predator Gods)
- Las religiones que nos separan (1995) (Spanish: The Religions that Divide Us)
- Videntes, visionarios y vividores (1998) (Spanish: Seers, Visionaries, and Deceivers)
- Un gallego llamado Cristóbal Colón, redescubridor de América (2002) (Spanish: A Galician Called Christopher Columbus, rediscoverer of America)
- La Expaña de Z (2010) (Spanish: The Xpain of Z)
- Teovnilogía: El origen del mal en el mundo (2012) (Spanish: Theoufology, the root of evil in the world)
