= Julius Obsequens =

4th or 5th-century Roman writer

Julius Obsequens was a Roman writer active in the 4th or early 5th centuries AD, during late antiquity. His sole known work is the Prodigiorum liber (Book of Prodigies), a tabulation of the wonders and portents (prodigia) that had occurred in the Roman Republic and early Principate in the years 249–12 BC. The material for the Prodigiorum liber was largely excerpted from the 1st century AD Ab Urbe Condita Libri of the Augustan historian Livy, which chronicled the history of the Roman state from its origin to the beginning of the imperial period, though Julius used it selectively and sometimes added interpretations of the omens and incidents he included. There is a common view that Julius only knew Livy's text wholly or in part from an epitome, but there is scant evidence of this.

The work was first printed by the Italian humanist Aldus Manutius in 1508, after a manuscript belonging to Jodocus of Verona (now lost). Of great importance was the edition by the Basle humanist Conrad Lycosthenes (1552), trying to reconstruct lost parts and illustrating the text with wood-cuts. Later editions were printed by Johannes Schefferus (Amsterdam, 1679), Franciscus Oudendorp (Leiden, 1720) and Otto Jahn (1853, with the periochae of Livy).

The text of Julius Obsequens frequently makes reference to unusual astronomical and meteorological events as portentous signs like meteor showers, comets, and sun dogs, alongside earthquakes, aberrant births, haruspicy, and sweating, crying, or bleeding statues.

After the alleged Kenneth Arnold UFO sighting in 1947, Harold T. Wilkins among others, interpreted Julius Obsequens as preserving ancient reports of unidentified flying objects (UFOs). Since Julius wrote some four centuries after the latest of the events he describes, his is not an eye-witness account, and for most of his subject matter his source Livy was himself neither an eye-witness nor even a contemporary. Obsequens was interested in signs and omens, not accurate weather reporting.
