= Elder race =

Fictional ancient race of beings

An elder or progenitor race, in science fiction, fantasy, or horror fiction, is an ancient race that not only preceded but helped shape the races that followed, often playing a significant role in the basis of the story. Humanity may have been descended from them, or they may be a different fictional race, such as elves, dwarves, or aliens. While in some cases, whether they currently exist is unclear, in other instances, members of an elder race still inhabit the world, either openly or in secret. In order to hide their existence, they may make use of a wainscot society, inhabit a parallel universe, only visiting the current one occasionally, or disguise themselves as a fool, deity, magician or trickster. One such example is in Lord of Light (1967), where highly advanced humans take on the identities of Hindu deities and act as gods to the less advanced colonists.

Elder races are typically either technologically or spiritually powerful, as well as wise. While sometimes benevolent, assisting younger races, they can also often be amoral, as in H.P. Lovecraft's Cthulhu Mythos, where the Elder Gods are indifferent to humanity's "petty" concerns. They are usually presented as having drifted apart from humanity in the present of the story, sometimes as lost empires whose inhabitants either left their former home for a new one, or were destroyed by a catastrophe and only live on in legend, such as Atlantis. They may appear both as enemies, or as allies against a greater threat.

== In science fiction ==
The trope of the elder race is used in science fiction to explore the tensions within family, as well as the relationship between colonizers and colonized. As such, the elder race is usually presented as far older and more decadent than the younger one, and who are undeserving of their status of ownership, or themselves deserve to be owned in turn.

In the film Prometheus (2012), the Engineers are depicted as humanity's progenitor race.

In the Babylon 5 TV series, the Vorlons, representatives of order, and the Shadows, Lovecraftian proponents of chaos, are elder races manipulating younger species throughout history in a surrogate war of ideals. Their presence is used in the show "to create an effective sense of the epic", while their actions later in the series subvert the expectation that they are wiser than the younger races. The struggle of humans and their partners to break free from the influence of the "First Ones" is a pivotal climax of Babylon 5.

== In science ==
The idea of an extraterrestrial elder race has been compared to panspermia, the hypothesis that human life may have been extraterrestrial in origin.

== See also ==
- Ancient astronauts
- Uplift (science fiction)
