= Kadhim Finjan al Hammami =

Iraqi politician (born 1958)

Minister of Transport (Iraq)
- Incumbent
- Assumed office 16 August 2016

Personal details
- Born: 1 May 1958 (age 67) Basra
- Occupation: Politician, iraqi minister of transport

Kadhim Finjan al Hammami (Arabic: كاظم فنجان الحمامي; born 1 May 1958) is an Iraqi politician who was the Iraqi Minister of Transport.

== Controversies ==
In 2016, al Hammami caused controversy during an inauguration of an airport in Dhi Qar Governorate, when he said that Sumerians had a port where spaceships could fly to other planets in 5000 BC, based on writings of Zecharia Sitchin, Samuel Noah Kramer and H. G. Wells. Later on, he claimed that Noah's Ark embarked from Nasiriyah.

In 2023 he was sentenced for two years of hard labor for corruption.
