= The Spaceships of Ezekiel =

Book by Josef F. Blumrich

- Softcover edition
- Author: Josef F. Blumrich
- Language: English
- Genre: Non-fiction
- Publisher: Bantam
- Publication date: June 21, 1974
- Publication place: United States
- Media type: Print (Paperback)
- Pages: 179 pp.
- ISBN: 0-553-08378-3 (first edition, paperback)

The Spaceships of Ezekiel (1974) is a book by German engineer Josef F. Blumrich (March 17, 1913 – February 10, 2002) about a spaceship that was supposedly observed by the prophet Ezekiel as described in Book of Ezekiel in the Tanakh. Blumrich wrote it while chief of NASA's systems layout branch of the program development office at the Marshall Space Flight Center. It was originally published in German by Econ Verlag GmbH under the title Da tat sich der Himmel auf (March 1973). Because it refers to theories and speculations about ancient astronauts, it is considered to be a work of pseudoscience as well as being an example of euhemerism.

== History ==
After ufologists such as Erich von Däniken had pointed to the possibility of interpreting Ezekiel's Merkabah vision as a report of an extraterrestrial spacecraft, Blumrich decided to disprove the hypothesis. However, a thorough examination convinced him that Ezekiel had, in fact, seen a spaceship. He then made detailed drawings of the alien craft. He decided the technology of the builders must have been somewhat higher than mankind's at the present, and added he had seldom felt as delighted, satisfied, and fascinated by being proven wrong.

== Content ==
In The Spaceships of Ezekiel Blumrich asserts that the account of Ezekiel in the Bible was not a description of a meeting with God in a prophetic vision, but one of several encounters with ancient astronauts in a shuttlecraft from another planet.

Blumrich analyzes six different translations of the Bible in conjunction with his experience in engineering and presents one possible version of Ezekiel's visions of how God—described as riding in an elaborate vehicle capable to see, attended by angels—supposedly showed him the future and gave him various messages to deliver. In the appendices to the book he presents technical specifications of the hypothesized spacecraft.

Blumrich also published an article on his belief, "The spaceships of the prophet Ezekiel", in the UNESCO journal Impact of Science on Society.

== The Mission ==
Blumich claims the Bible describes Ezekiel's encounters with beings in a spacecraft. He argues that their mission was to enlighten the prophet in a peaceful manner and that they were sent by God. He says every passage in the story had information about how calm the beings were. Blumrich claims that the commander of the craft took Ezekiel for a journey in it, that they landed at a different site from where they took off, and that they returned to where they departed. Blumrich suggests it was like a helicopter ride.

== Location ==
In the book and the Bible, Ezekiel gives a description of his takeoff and landing sites. In the Bible, Ezekiel 43:3 states "And the vision I saw was like the vision which I had seen when he came to destroy the city. And the visions I saw were like the vision which I had seen by the river Chebar; and I fell upon my face." Blumrich mistranslated "visions" in the latter part of verse 3 to "vehicular structure". We know based on biblical accounts that the story took place in the Middle East. The river Chebar comes up eight times throughout the book. We can historically track this river to be in Babylonia. Another verse mentions Tel Abib which may translate as Tel Aviv.

=== Spaceship Airframe ===
Much of this book focuses on the supposed spacecraft that Ezekiel saw. Blumrich uses his background in aeronautical engineering to interpret the descriptions and envision what Ezekiel could have seen. Blumrich goes into a lot of detail on why the ship is shaped and designed the way it is. He cites physics, engine problems, and mathematics. He addresses topics from air conditioning units to power units to engines to rocket propulsion.

His descriptions may make sense to the average reader who doesn't have an aerospace engineering background. The craft as described in the book lacks many features that would be needed in order for it function.

=== Omni wheel ===
Blumrich designed a wheel that is capable of moving in two different planes of travel at the same time: forward-backward and left-right direction. The design was awarded a US Patent and is known as Omni wheel, which is used on forklifts & space exploration vehicles.

== Criticism ==
Ronald Story in his book Guardians of the Universe? (1980) stated "Blumrich doctors up his Biblical quotes just a smidgen to make them conform a little better to his spaceship interpretation", and "The Spaceships of Ezekiel, in all honesty, can only be described as an extreme form of rationalisation, with a good supply of technical jargon, charts, and diagrams, carefully designed to impress the general reader. The book does contain a good collection of impressive drawings which prove nothing more than that whoever prepared them is a good draughtsman." Jerome Clark wrote that Blumrich "offered a creative but misplaced effort to translate the metaphorical biblical account into a properly engineered spacecraft".

== See also ==
- Ancient astronaut theories
- Ezekiel 1
- Ezekiel Airship
- The Manna Machine
