= Robert F. Marx =

American author and scuba diver (1936–2019)

Sir Robert F. Marx
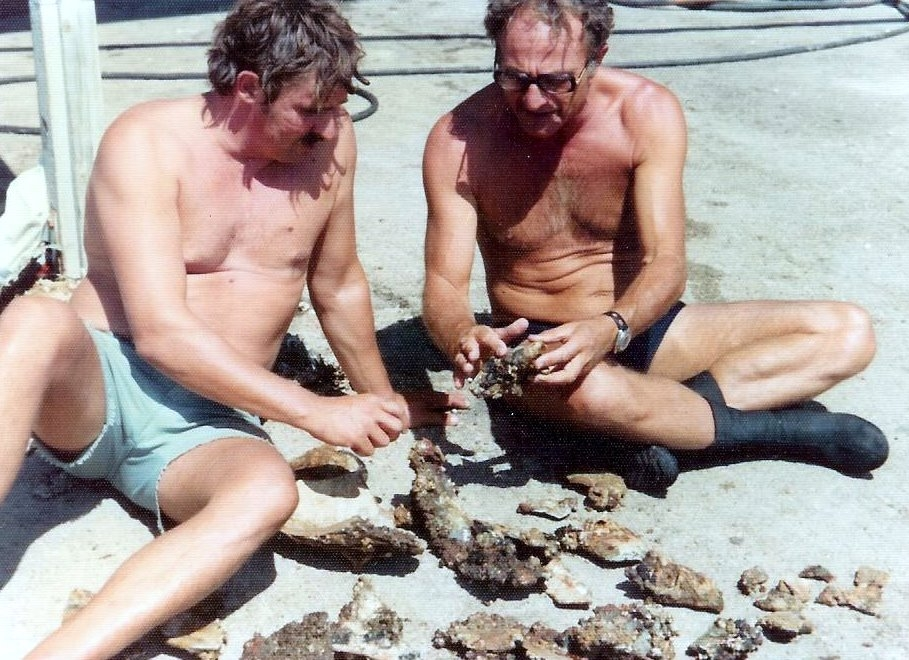
- Bob Marx (left) with Israeli marine archaeologist Elisha Linder in 1982
- Born: December 8, 1936; Pittsburgh, Pennsylvania, United States
- Died: 4 July 2019 (aged 82)
- Known for: Excavation of Port Royal, Discovery of Nuestra Señora de las Maravillas, extensive writing about White gods
- Awards: Order of Isabella the Catholic
- Scientific career
- Fields: Underwater archaeology Maritime history Naval history

Robert F. Marx (December 8, 1936 – July 4, 2019) was an American pioneer in scuba diving, a prolific author, and was best known for his work as an avocational marine archaeologist. Over his career, he discovered over 5000 shipwrecks in over 60 countries. Although some accused him of treasure hunting, fellow avocational archeologist E. Lee Spence described Marx as the "true father of underwater archaeology". Marx also helped write UNESCO legislation regarding shipwrecks.

Marx wrote extensively about the concept of White gods. Marx came to the conclusion that White Gods "figure in almost every indigenous culture in the Americas".

== Career ==
Marx was born on December 8, 1936, in Pittsburgh Pennsylvania.

=== Marine Corps ===
In 1953, at the age of 17, Marx joined the United States Marine Corps where he served as a staff sergeant in combat in Korea. He then became a diving specialist. He later became the Director of the USMC Diving School, Vieques, Puerto Rico.

=== Discoveries ===
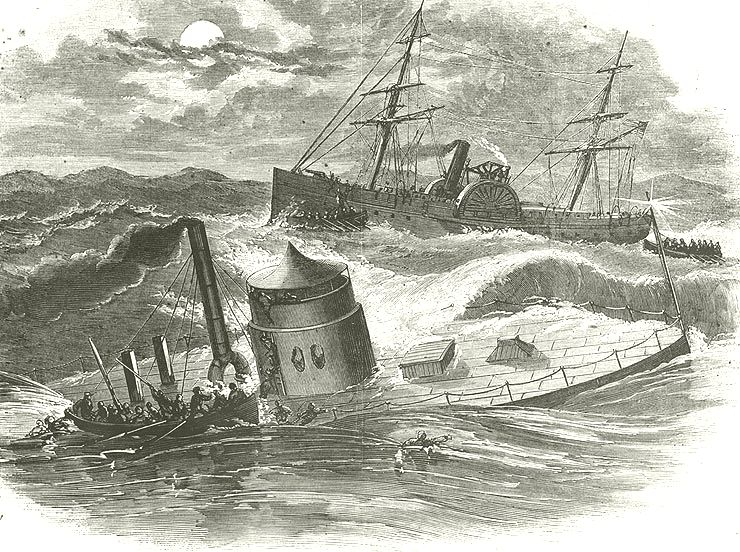
Marx claimed to have discovered the USS Monitor.

He went on to make over 5,000 dives and authored over 800 reports and articles and 59 books on history, archaeology, shipwrecks and exploration. He was a founding member of the Council on Underwater Archaeology and of the Sea Research Society and served on the Society's Board of Advisors. Marx claimed to have discovered the USS Monitor. He said he had dived on the wreck and placed a Coke bottle with his name on it in one of the gun barrels, although he never provided any proof of his story. In 1972 he participated in the creation of the research/professional degree of Doctor of Marine Histories. In 1972, Marx discovered and salvaged the Spanish galleon Nuestra Señora de las Maravillas, which wrecked off the coast of Grand Bahama in 1656. His expedition later became the subject of the network television documentary Treasure Galleon narrated by Rod Serling.

== Alleged discovery of Roman amphorae ==
Also when Marx went to Brazil in 1982 when he attempted to prove that Roman amphorae had been brought there by ship. In 1985 Marx claimed that the Brazilian government covered up the amphorae, an allegation the government denied. A businessman named Americo Santarelli said that he had 16 amphora replicas made which he dropped in the bay to age them but had only recovered four. A year before this dispute the government charged Marx of contraband backing this claim with a catalogue of a 1983 Amsterdam auction where gold coins and other artefacts were offered for sale by Marx and his associates that had not been declared by Marx despite an agreement to do so. Several attempts to let Marx respond to this allegation were rebuffed, including Marx answering the phone saying "Don't call me".

=== Recreated voyages ===
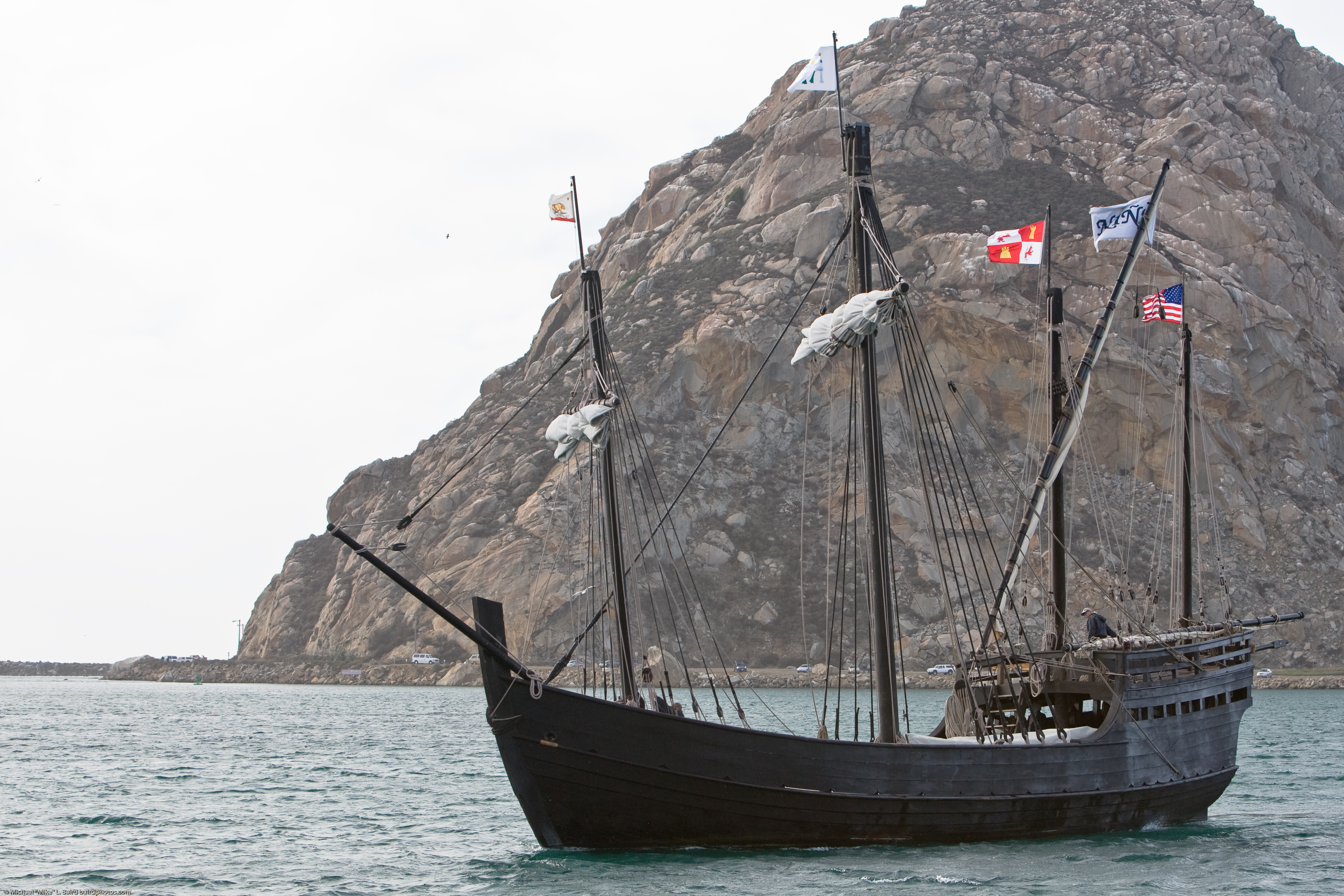
Marx recreated Columbus's voyage on a replica of the Niña.

In 1962, Marx organized and led a re-enactment of Christopher Columbus' voyage from the Canary Islands to San Salvador Island in an exact replica of his ship La Niña, donned the Niña II. After 3 months, they arrived in the Bahamas on Christmas Eve. According to Marx, "It’s likely the closest modern sailors had come to experiencing the conditions, the determination, and the incredible amount of luck that was needed to cross an ocean 500 years ago." As a result of his endeavor, Marx was made a Knight-commander in the Order of Isabella the Catholic by the Spanish government. In 1964 and 1969 he was the organizer and captain of two voyages of replica Viking ships from Europe to the Americas. He sought to demonstrate the possibility of pre-Columbian transatlantic contact.

Following his trip, Marx appeared as himself on the January 14, 1963 episode of the game show To Tell the Truth. He received three of four possible votes.

== Writings ==
Marx authored 59 books and over 900 articles. He was also the Adventure Editor of the Saturday Evening Post, Archaeology Editor of Argosy magazine, as well as a consultant for television and film. He appeared in the documentary television series History's Mysteries. He also produced 55 television documentary films and has worked or appeared in more than a hundred more. Marx also helped write UNESCO legislation regarding shipwrecks, as he had interacted with local governments throughout his career in order to gain access to wrecks. Marx was also a member of the Explorer's Club.

== White gods ==
Marx wrote extensively about the concept of White gods. Marx came to the conclusion that White Gods "figure in almost every indigenous culture in the Americas." A review by Jonathan Kirsch in the Los Angeles Times concluded that "Quest" was a good yarn, but Marx tried hard to dress it up as something slightly scandalous. In that sense, "Quest" was the archeological equivalent of Oliver Stone's JFK—Marx seeks to prove the existence of "great white gods" by offering us a haphazard collection of oddities, rumors and coincidences, but what's on display here is really nothing more than the passions and obsessions of a born showman."

Marx argued that the Vikings created the Mayan civilisation, arguing that "Their kingdom was founded by a great eastern ruler named Votan. Votan was a white man who with his crew of tall, fair-haired, blue eyed men in dragon-prowed "serpent ships" brought the Mayan people across the sea and settled them in their new land." The problem is that the Popul Vuh has no mention of a Votan. This claim originates in the mistaken translations by Diego de Landa who thought that Mayan glyphs were letters corresponding to the Roman alphabet.

== Personal life ==
Marx met his wife, Jenifer, during the excavation of Port Royal in Jamaica in the 1960s. In later life, they lived in Indialantic, Florida with their three daughters. Together, they co-authored over 30 non-fiction books.

== Death ==
Marx died on July 4, 2019, at the age of 82.

== Bibliography ==
- They Found Treasure: [interviews] by Robert Forrest Burgess (New York : Dodd, Mead, ©1977) ISBN 0-396-07450-2, OCLC 2797871
- In Quest of the Great White Gods: contact between the Old and New World from the dawn of history by Robert F Marx and Jenifer Marx (New York : Crown, ©1992) ISBN 0-517-58270-8, ISBN 978-0-517-58270-1, OCLC 24065049
- Readings in Physical Anthropology and Archaeology by David E Hunter and Phillip Whitten (New York : Harper & Row, ©1978) ISBN 0-06-043023-0, ISBN 978-0-06-043023-8, OCLC: 4004685
- Always Another Adventure, by Robert F Marx (Cleveland, World Pub. Co., 1967) OCLC 1355136
- Shipwrecks of the Virgin Islands, 1523-1825 by Robert F Marx; Edward L Towle and the Caribbean Research Institute (St. Thomas, V.I., Caribbean Research Institute, 1969) OCLC: 209714
- The Search for Sunken Treasure: Exploring the world's great shipwrecks by Robert F Marx and Jenifer Marx (Toronto : Key-Porter Books, ©1993) ISBN 1-55013-418-3, ISBN 978-1-55013-418-6, ISBN 1-55013-497-3, ISBN 978-1-55013-497-1, OCLC 28018648
- Treasure Lost at Sea : Diving to the world's great shipwrecks by Robert F Marx and Jenifer Marx (Buffalo, N.Y. : Firefly Books, ©2003) ISBN 1-55297-872-9, ISBN 978-1-55297-872-6, OCLC 54464113
- The Battle of the Spanish Armada 1588 by Robert F Marx (Cleveland, World Pub. Co., ©1965) OCLC 920618
- Still More Adventures by Robert F Marx (Mason/Charter, 1976) ISBN 0-88405-359-8 OCLC 2332224
- Sea Fever by Robert F Marx (Garden City, N.Y., Doubleday, 1972) OCLC 393700
- Port Royal Rediscovered by Robert F Marx (Garden City, N.Y., Doubleday, 1973) ISBN 0-385-08296-7, ISBN 978-0-385-08296-9, OCLC 613717
- The Underwater Dig: an introduction to marine archaeology by Robert F Marx (New York : H.Z. Walck, 1975) ISBN 0-8098-3536-3, OCLC: 1504496
- Shipwrecks of the Western Hemisphere, 1492-1825 by Robert F Marx (New York, World Pub. Co., 1971) OCLC 207459
- The Lure of Sunken Treasure: under the sea with marine archaeologists and treasure hunters by Robert F Marx (New York, McKay, 1973) OCLC 714464
- Into the Deep : the history of man's underwater exploration by Robert F Marx (Van Nostrand Reinhold, ©1978) ISBN 0-442-80386-9, ISBN 978-0-442-80386-5, OCLC: 3844466
- Encyclopedia of Western Atlantic Shipwrecks and Sunken Treasure by Victoria Sandz and Robert F Marx (Jefferson, N.C.: McFarland, ©2001) ISBN 0-7864-1018-3, OCLC 46836931
- The World's Richest Shipwrecks by Robert F Marx and Jenifer Marx (Toronto: Key Porter Books, 2005) ISBN 1-55263-656-9, OCLC 60369569
- Treasures from the Sea: Exploring the world's great shipwrecks by Robert F Marx and Jenifer Marx (Toronto: Key Porter Books, 2003) ISBN 1-55263-207-5, [ OCLC 52039638]
- The treasure fleets of the Spanish Main by Robert F Marx (Cleveland, World Pub. Co., 1968) OCLC 448399
- The Battle of Lepanto, 1571 by Robert F Marx (Cleveland, World Pub. Co., 1966) OCLC 1349558
- They Dared the Deep; a history of diving by Robert F Marx (Cleveland, World Pub. Co., 1967) OCLC 1354152
- Following Columbus; the voyage of the Nina II by Robert F Marx (Cleveland, World Pub. Co., ©1964) OCLC: 1413847
- Buried Treasure of the United States: how and where to locate hidden wealth by Robert F Marx (New York : McKay, ©1978) ISBN 0-679-50795-7, ISBN 978-0-679-50795-6, [ OCLC: 3203427]
- Buried treasures you can find : over 7500 locations in all 50 states by Robert F Marx (Dallas, TX : Ram Books, ©1993)ISBN 0915920824, ISBN 978-0-915920-82-2, OCLC: 29561608
- Shipwrecks in Florida Waters : a billion dollar graveyard by Robert F Marx (Chuluota, Fla.: Mickler House, 1985, ©1979) ISBN 0-913122-51-3, OCLC 13651406
- The History of Underwater Exploration by Robert F Marx (New York : Dover Publications, 1990) ISBN 0-486-26487-4, OCLC 21563447
- In the Wake of Galleons by Robert F Marx (Flagstaff, AZ: Best Pub. Co., ©2001) ISBN 0-941332-95-0, OCLC 49311568
- Clay smoking pipes recovered from the sunken city of Port Royal October 1, 1967 – March 31, 1968 by Robert F Marx; Jamaica National Trust Commission (Kingston, Jamaica National Trust Commission, 1968) OCLC 121031
