= Robert Dione =

American pseudohistorian

Robert Dione (also known as R. L. Dione) (February 23, 1922 in Portland, Maine – December 12, 1996 in Clinton, Connecticut) was a school teacher in Connecticut and an author on two books on UFOs and ancient astronauts.

== Life and career ==
During World War II he was a paratrooper in the European Theatre. He obtained a B.S degree from the University of Maine and an M.A. Degree from Columbia Teachers College. He traveled widely, and authored two books on ancient astronauts, God Drives a Flying Saucer and a later book Is God Super-Natural? - The 4000 Year Misunderstanding. He was married and fathered five children.

== God Drives a Flying Saucer ==
Dione wrote God Drives a Flying Saucer in 1969. The book is known for its eccentric claims:

- God is not supernatural but is a technologically advanced Ufonaut (Saucerian God)
- The angel Gabriel hypnotized Mary and injected her with a hypodermic needle with God's sperm in it
- Jesus was born by artificial insemination
- Extraterrestrial visitation from aliens is common in both the Old and New Testament
- Ezekiels visions were hallucinations caused by UFOS
- UFOS are God's messengers
- God is immortal through technology
- Heaven is a supertechnological society
- All miracles are to be explained by flying saucer technology
- The human brain is akin to a radio: it can receive and emit electromagnetic signals
- The star over Bethlehem was a luminous flying saucer

Dione believed that aliens could track a particular person on earth and beam in thoughts to control them by using "God's radio frequency". Dione claimed that the God was upset with Russia because of its atheism, so God manipulated Hitler by sending Hitler electromagnetic brain signals to overthrow the Russian Empire. Dione also claimed in the book that Jesus did not perform any miracles in the Bible, the miracles were actually due to mind manipulation caused by alien technology. According to Dione, “By the use of hypnotism He (Saucerian God) created the twisted, blind and insane subjects Jesus was to cure at a later date.”

== See also ==
- Morris Jessup
- Paul Misraki
