= Jean Sendy =

French writer and translator (1910–1978)

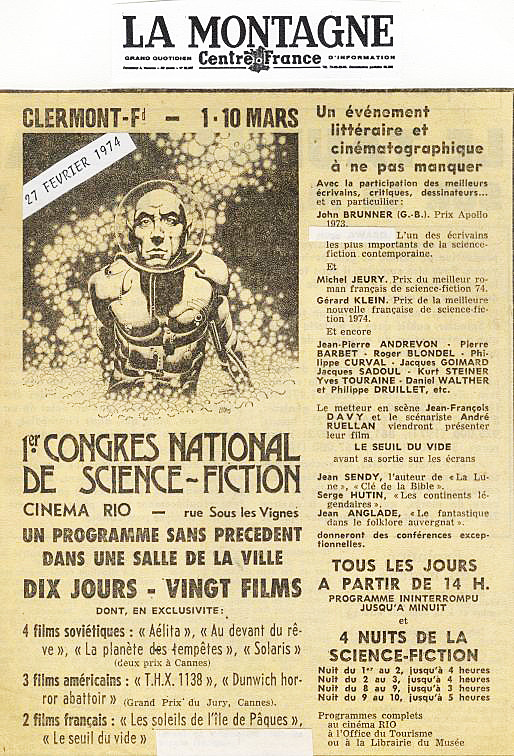
Newspaper article announcing the program of the "first national congress on science-fiction" in Clermont, France, February 1974, where J. Sendy was an invited guest (right column, center).

Jean Sendy (1910–1978) was a French writer and translator, author of works on esoterica and UFO phenomena. He was also an early proponent of the ancient astronaut hypothesis.

== Ancient astronauts ==
He wrote the book "The Moon: The Key to the Bible" in 1968, in which he claimed the word "Elohim" mentioned in the Hebrew Genesis of the Bible, which is usually translated as God, should in fact be translated in the plural as "Gods" because the singular of the word Elohim is Eloah. He claimed that the "Gods" were actually space travelers (an alien race of humanoids). Sendy believed that Genesis was factual history of ancient astronauts colonizing earth who became "angels in human memory". The book contains many ideas later found in the UFO religion Raëlism.

In his 1969 book Those Gods who made Heaven and Earth, Sendy claimed that space travelers 23,500 years ago arrived in the Solar System in a large hollow sphere and seeded humanity.

== List of works ==
- La lune: Clé de la Bible (translated in English The moon: The key to the Bible) (1968) later edition (1974)
- Those Gods Who Made Heaven & Earth; the novel of the Bible (1969) later edition (1972) ISBN 0-425-02130-0
- The Coming of the Gods (1970) later edition (1973) ISBN 0-425-02398-2
- Moon Outpost Of Gods (1975) ISBN 0-425-02798-8

== Public lectures ==
- Premier Congres National de Science-Fiction – Clermont-Ferrand, France, March 1–10, 1974

== See also ==
- Morris Jessup
- Paul Misraki
