= Peter Kolosimo =

Italian journalist and writer

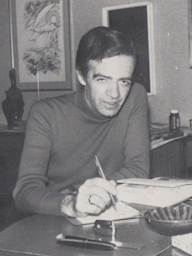
- Born: Pier Domenico Colosimo; 15 December 1922; Modena, Italy
- Died: 23 March 1984 (aged 61); Milan, Italy
- Occupation: writer
- Writing career
- Subjects: pseudoarchaeology ancient astronauts
- Notable works: Astronavi sulla preistoria Not of This World

Peter Kolosimo, pseudonym of Pier Domenico Colosimo (Modena, 15 December 1922 – Milan, 23 March 1984), was an Italian journalist and writer. He is ranked amongst the founders of pseudoarchaeology (in Italian: fantarcheologia), a controversial topic in which interpretations of the past are made that are not accepted by the archaeological science community, which rejects the accepted data-gathering and analytical methods of the discipline. He also popularised ancient astronaut theories of contact between extraterrestrial beings and ancient human civilizations.

During the late 1950s and the 1960s, he was published in some of the first Italian science fiction magazines, such as Romanzi del Cosmo ("Cosmic Novels"), and his articles were regularly featured in the science/science fiction magazine Oltre il Cielo ("Beyond the Sky"). He published many more books, all widely popular and translated in 60 countries, including Russia, Japan, and China. In the 1970s and early 1980s until his death, he was the editor of many magazines, including Pi Kappa, a "fantarchaeologia" magazine covering the same topics that Kolosimo did in his books. In later life, he wrote a few books with his wife, Caterina, by whom he had a daughter, Alessandra (born 1970).

Kolosimo also founded and coordinated the Italian Association for Prehistoric Studies (ASP).

He died in Milan in 1984.

== Reception ==
Kolosimo's claims about ancient astronauts influencing human civilizations are considered to be pseudohistory.

In a review of Kolosimo's Not of This World, Jason Colavito has alleged that the book fabricates evidence, mistranslates sources and conflates science fiction and fact.

Wu Ming, an Italy-based collective of writers, considered Kolosimo a "fellow novelist" and wrote about him on several occasions, including a story published in GQ (Italian edition), where they stated, "we like to think he just left the planet, and is still travelling across the universe." He is remembered lovingly as well by the writer Massimo Pietroselli in Fantascienza.com, an Italian science fiction online magazine, as a dreamer who was writing for the people, and encouraging the Soviet alternative to regular, conservative science, and did so successfully. Pagine 70, another Italian magazine, described Non è terrestre as his "first official revenge on the academic world" that tended to reject his ideas. The author goes on to describe Kolosimo as "an affable man, perhaps a great conversationalist, certainly an uncommon man." He describes Kolosimo’s work as undeterred against the repeated "snobbery of the academic world" and argues that it demonstrates that "imagination is a social weapon, which can break down regimes, give birth to states, and think … even manage to land on the moon."

== Selected bibliography ==
=== Books ===
- Il pianeta sconosciuto (1957) ISBN 9788842539803
- Terra senza tempo (1964; translated into English as Timeless Earth) ISBN 9788842533177
- Ombre sulle stelle (1966) ISBN 9788842534235
- Psicologia dell'eros (1967)
- Non è terrestre (1968; translated as Not of this World) ISBN 9788842534129
- Guida al mondo dei sogni (1968)
- Il comportamento erotico degli europei (1970)
- Cittadini delle tenebre (1971)
- Astronavi sulla preistoria (1972; translated as Spaceships in Prehistory) ISBN 9788842532149
- Odissea stellare (1974) ISBN 9788842542414
- Fratelli dell'infinito (1975)
- Polvere d'inferno (1975)
- Italia mistero cosmico (1977) ISBN 9788842547013
- Civiltà del silenzio (1978)
- Fiori di luna (1979)
- Io e l'indiano (1979)
- Viaggiatori del tempo (1981)
- I misteri dell'universo (1982, with Caterina Kolosimo)

=== Novels ===
- Fronte del sole or I cavalieri delle stelle (From Outer Space; 1979, with Caterina Kolosimo)
- Missione uomo (1982, with Oscar Warner)

=== Editor ===
- Pi Kappa, rivista di mistero, archeologia ed esobiologia (director), I-II, (1972-1973)
- Dimensione X, enciclopedia del mistero (coordinator), 1-10, (1982)
- Italia misteriosa (editor, 1984)
- Scrutando nel futuro (editor, 1984)
