= The Sirius Mystery =

Pseudoarchaeology book by Robert K. G. Temple

- Cover of the first edition
- Author: Robert K. G. Temple
- Language: English
- Subject: Dogon people
- Publisher: St. Martin's Press
- Publication date: 1976
- Publication place: United States
- Media type: Print
- Pages: 440 pp. (softcover)
- ISBN: 0-09-925744-0
- OCLC: 60154574

The Sirius Mystery is a book written by Robert K. G. Temple supporting the pseudoscientific ancient astronauts hypothesis that intelligent extraterrestrial beings visited the Earth and made contact with humans in antiquity and prehistoric times. The book was first published by St. Martin's Press in 1976. Its second, 1998, edition is called The Sirius Mystery: New Scientific Evidence of Alien Contact 5,000 Years Ago.

== Overview ==
The book presents the hypothesis that the Dogon people of Mali, in West Africa, preserve a tradition of contact with intelligent extraterrestrial beings from the Sirius star system. These beings, who are hypothesized to have taught the arts of civilization to humans, are claimed in the book to have originated the systems of the Pharaohs of Egypt, the mythology of Greek civilization, and the Epic of Gilgamesh, among other things. Temple's theory is heavily based on his interpretation of the work of ethnographers Marcel Griaule and Germaine Dieterlen. A substantial bulk of The Sirius Mystery consists of comparative linguistic and mythological scholarship, pointing out resemblances among Dogon, Yoruba, Egyptian and Sumerian beliefs and symbols. Greek and Arab myths and words are considered to a lesser extent.

The mystery that is central to the book is how the Dogon allegedly acquired knowledge of Sirius B, the white dwarf companion star of Sirius A, invisible to the naked eye. Sirius B was first observed in 1862, and had been predicted in 1844 on dynamic grounds. Temple considers alternative possibilities other than alien contact, such as a very ancient, advanced, and lost civilization that was behind the sudden appearance of advanced civilization in both Egypt and Sumer. Temple does not argue that contact with an advanced civilization is the only way that the Dogon could have obtained what he understood to be accurate information on Sirius B, but he indicates that he personally finds the theory of alien contact more convincing.

However, doubts have been raised about the reliability of Griaule and Dieterlen's work on which The Sirius Mystery is based, and alternative explanations have been proposed. Noah Brosch explained in his book Sirius Matters that cultural transfer could have taken place between 19th century French astronomers and Dogon tribe members during the observations of the solar eclipse on 16 April 1893. The expedition, led by Henri Deslandres, stayed in the field for five weeks, and it is reasonable that during this time many contacts with the locals took place, and that relatively modern astronomical knowledge was then transferred. The claims about the Dogons' astronomical knowledge have also been challenged. For instance, the anthropologist Walter Van Beek, who studied the Dogon after Griaule and Dieterlen, found no evidence that the Dogon considered Sirius to be a double star and/or that astronomy was particularly important in their belief system. Others, such as Marcel Griaule's daughter Geneviève Calame-Griaule and an anthropologist, Luc de Heusch, came to criticize Van Beek's dismissal as "political" and riddled with "unchecked speculation", demonstrating a general ignorance of Dogon esoteric tradition.

== Reviews of claims ==
=== Ian Ridpath ===
In 1978, astronomer Ian Ridpath observes, in an article in the Skeptical Inquirer, "The whole Dogon legend of Sirius and its companions are riddled with ambiguities, contradictions, and downright errors, at least if we try to interpret it literally." Ridpath states that while the information that the Dogon probably gained from Europeans to some extent resembles the facts about Sirius, the presumed original Dogon knowledge of the star is very far from the facts. Ridpath concludes that any information that resembles the facts about Sirius was probably ascertained by way of cultural contact with Europeans. More recent research suggests that the contact was Griaule himself.

=== Carl Sagan ===
Astronomer Carl Sagan touched upon the issue in his book Broca's Brain (1979), seeing problems in Temple's hypothesis. As an example, Sagan believes that because the Dogon seem to have no knowledge of another planet beyond Saturn which has rings, their knowledge is therefore more likely to have come from European, and not extraterrestrial, sources.

=== James Oberg ===
Journalist and skeptic James Oberg collected claims concerning Dogon mythology in his 1982 book UFOs and Outer Space Mysteries. According to Oberg, the Dogons' astronomical information resembled the knowledge and speculations of late 1920s Europe, suggesting that the Dogon were influenced by European visitors before their mythology was recorded in the 1930s. Oberg also says that the Dogon were not an isolated group and that a member might have acquired knowledge about Sirius B while abroad and later passed it on to the tribe. Oberg comments that "there is no archaeological evidence that the specific references to the twin hidden companions of Sirius are anywhere near that old. Furthermore, most Dogon symbology already has multiple levels of meaning; the sketches used to illustrate the Sirius secrets are also used in puberty ceremonies" while pointing out that the evidence for it being recently acquired remains circumstantial.

=== Jason Colavito ===
Skeptic Jason Colavito counts The Sirius Mystery among the body of works in a tradition of ancient astronaut ideas he believes were ultimately inspired by H. P. Lovecraft's Cthulhu Mythos.

== Unproven claims ==
One unproven aspect of the reported Dogon knowledge of the Sirius system is the assertion that the Dogon knew of another star in the Sirius system, Emme Ya, or "larger than Sirius B but lighter and dim in magnitude." A dynamical study published in 1995, based on anomalous perturbations of Sirius B (suggestive of the star being gravitationally influenced by another body) concluded that the presence of a third star orbiting Sirius could not be ruled out. An apparent "third star" observed in the 1920s is now confirmed as a background object, something previously suggested by Holberg in 2007:

Benest and Duvent found that stable orbits with a period of up to six years exist around Sirius A. There are no stable orbits around the less massive Sirius B which exceed three years. Therefore, if Sirius C exists, it must orbit Sirius A. It is also possible to conclude that such a star could in no way be responsible for the flurry of sightings from the 1920s, it would be too faint and too close to Sirius A to have ever been seen by visual observers.

— J. B. Holberg

The former study also concluded that while a triple system for Sirius could not be fully eliminated, the probability was low.

Temple's book and the debates that followed its release publicized the existence of the Dogon tribe among many New Age followers and proponents of ancient astronaut theories. Speculation about the Dogon on numerous websites is now mingled with fact, leading to wide misunderstanding among the public about Dogon mythology. Temple, however, has stated in the reprint of The Sirius Mystery (1999) that he in no way supports what he refers to as "sinister cults" that have been inspired by his book, a reference to the Typhonian OTO.

He also used the second edition of his book to complain about what he said was "the extreme and virulent hostility towards me by certain security agencies, most notably the American ones."

== See also ==
- List of alleged extraterrestrial beings
- Murry Hope
- Nommo
- Pseudoarchaeology
