= Harold T. Wilkins =

British journalist and author (1891–1960)

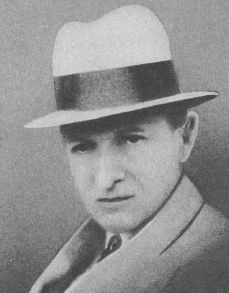
- Wilkins in 1936
- Born: June 1891
- Died: 1960 (aged 68–69)
- Occupations: Journalist, pseudohistoric writer

Harold Tom Wilkins (June 1891 – 1960) was a British journalist known for his books on treasure hunting and pseudohistoric claims about Atlantis and South America.

== Biography ==
Brought up in Gloucester, the son of engine driver Albert Wilkins and his wife Leah, Wilkins read English and history at Cambridge University and began a career in journalism. In the First World War he was imprisoned as a conscientious objector. He regularly reported on the early television experiments of John L. Baird, during the years 1926—1932.

In 1931, Wilkins wrote a detailed description of the mystery of the Mary Celeste for the Quarterly Review. It was later reprinted in his book Mysteries Solved and Unsolved. In the 1950s he published books claiming that UFOs are hostile. Wilkins also wrote about White Gods, writing that a vanished white race had occupied the whole of South America in ancient times. Wilkins in his Mysteries of Ancient South America (1945) compiled further accounts of similar sightings of "White Indians" in the Amazon Rainforest from the 16th to 19th century by explorers and Jesuits. Wilkins was also an influence on the Hollow Earth theory, as he located the descendants of Atlantis to tunnels in South America, especially in Brazil; he also discussed tunnels in other locations such as the Andes.

Wilkins, in his book Strange Mysteries of Time and Space, wrote about the Mary Celeste, disappearances at Glastenbury Mountain, medieval mysteries, disappearing aircraft, ships, and people, including Ambrose Bierce and the fictitious David Lang disappearance, claimed by him to be factual.

== Reception ==
The anthropologist John Alden Mason described Wilkins's research as pseudohistory and noted that most of his statements capable of verification turned out to be incorrect.

A review in Western Folklore claimed that Wilkins's Mysteries of Ancient South America reads like a science fiction book owing to its pseudohistoric claims.

His Secret Cities of Old South America was described by The Explorers Club in a review as a "crank book, basing most of its fantastic conclusions on the assumption that Atlantis and Mu did exist... Despite a long bibliography there is little dependable documentation in the book. It is vaporous hearsay."

Jason Colavito has noted that Wilkins was a plagiarist. In his book Secret Cities of Old South America he had taken material from Madame Blavatsky's The Secret Doctrine.

== Bibliography ==
=== Pirate treasure ===
- Hunting Hidden Treasures (1929)
- Modern Buried Treasure Hunters (1934)
- Pirate treasure (1934)
- Captain Kidd and his Skeleton Island (1935)
- Panorama of Pirate Treasure (1940)
- Mysteries and Monsters of the Deep (1948)
- The Mystery and Legend of Cocos Treasure Island (1948)

=== Ancient astronaut and UFO ===
- Flying Saucers on the Attack (1954)
- Flying Saucers from the Moon (1954)
- Flying Saucers Uncensored (1955)

==== South America ====
- Mysteries of Ancient South America (1945)
- Secret Cities of Old South America (1952)

==== Other ====
- Strange Mysteries of Time and Space (1958)
- Mysteries Solved And Unsolved (1961)

=== Articles ===
- Secrets of Ancient Torture Chambers. Popular Mechanics. September 1929. pp. 402–407.
- Wilkins, Harold T. (1931). Light on the Mystery of the "Mary Celeste". Quarterly Review 257: 82–96.
- History of the Talking Mongoose. Fate. June 1952. pp. 58–69.
