= List of programs broadcast by the History Channel =

This is an incomplete list of television programs formerly or currently broadcast by History Channel/H2/Military History Channel in the United States.

== Current programming ==
=== Unscripted ===
- Alone
- American Pickers
- Ancient Aliens
- Ancient Aliens: Origins
- The Curse of Oak Island
- The Food That Built America
- Forged in Fire
- Hazardous History with Henry Winkler
- History's Deadliest with Ving Rhames
- History's Greatest Mysteries
- History's Greatest Machines with Dolph Lundgren
- History's Greatest Picks with Mike Wolfe
- History's Greatest Warriors
- Ice Road Truckers
- Life After People
- The Mega-Brands That Built America
- MonsterQuest
- Mountain Men
- Mysteries From Above
- Mysteries Unearthed with Danny Trejo
- Pawn Stars
- The Proof Is Out There
- The Proof Is Out There: Alien Edition
- The Proof Is Out There: Unexplained Edition
- The Secret of Skinwalker Ranch
- Secrets Declassified with David Duchovny
- Swamp People
- The UnBelievable with Dan Aykroyd
- The UnXplained
- World War II with Tom Hanks

== Former programming ==
=== Scripted ===
==== Drama ====
- Gangland Undercover (2015–17)
- Knightfall (2017–19)
- Project Blue Book (2019–20)
- Six (2017–18)
- Vikings (2013–20)

==== Miniseries ====
- Abraham Lincoln (2022)
- Barbarians (2004–07)
- The Bible (2013)
- FDR (2023)
- Grant (2020)
- Hatfields & McCoys (2012)
- Houdini (2014)
- Kennedy (2023)
- The Men Who Built America (2012)
- The Men Who Built America: Frontiersmen (2018)
- Napoleon (2003) (Acquired from France2)
- The Revolution (2006)
- Roots (2016)
- Sitting Bull (2025)
- Sons of Liberty (2015)
- Texas Rising (2015)
- Theodore Roosevelt (2022)
- Thomas Jefferson (2025)
- The Titans That Built America (2021)
- Washington (2020)

==== Animation ====
- Gadget Boy's Adventures in History
- Inspector Gadget's Field Trip

=== Unscripted ===
==== Docuseries ====
- The Kennedys
- Drive Thru History (2005)

==== Documentary films & TV series ====
- 10 Days That Unexpectedly Changed America
- 10 Things You Don't Know About
- 101 Fast Foods That Changed The World
- 101 Gadgets That Changed The World
- 101 Inventions That Changed The World
- 101 Objects That Changed The World
- 101 Things That Changed The World
- 102 Minutes That Changed America
- 12 Days That Shocked the World
- 1968 With Tom Brokaw
- 20th Century with Mike Wallace
- 60 Hours
- 70s Fever
- 761st Tank Battalion: The Original Black Panthers
- 9/11 Conspiracies: Fact or Fiction
- 9/11: The Days After
- 9/11: Escape From the Towers
- 9/11: The Final Minutes of Flight 93
- 9/11: Four Flights
- 9/11: I Was There
- 9/11: Inside Air Force
- 9/11: The Legacy
- 9/11: State of Emergency
- Adam Eats the 80s
- After Jackie
- Alaska: Big America
- Alaska: Dangerous Territory
- Alcatraz: Search for the Truth
- Alcatraz Escape: The Lost Evidence
- Amelia Earhart: The Lost Evidence
- America: The Story of Us
- America Unearthed
- American Daredevils
- American Eats
- American Eats: History on a Bun
- The American Farm
- The American Presidency with Bill Clinton
- The American Soldier
- America's 9/11 Flag: Rise from the Ashes
- America's Book of Secrets
- America's Greatest Prison Breaks
- Ancient Discoveries
- Ancient Empires
- Ancient Impossible
- Ancient Mysteries
- Ancients Behaving Badly
- Andrew Jackson
- Angels and Demons: Decoded
- Ape to Man
- Armageddon
- Assembly Required
- Auschwitz Untold
- Automobiles
- Back to the Blueprint
- Banned from the Bible
- Battle 360°
- Battlefield Detectives
- Battles BC
- The Beatles on Record
- Beltway Unbuckled
- Ben Franklin
- The Bermuda Triangle: Into Cursed Waters
- The Bible Code: Predicting Armageddon
- Bible Secrets Revealed
- Big History
- Black Blizzard
- Black Patriots: Buffalo Soldiers
- Black Patriots: Heroes of the Civil War
- Black Patriots: Heroes of the Revolution
- Blood Diamonds
- Boneyard
- Boys' Toys
- Brad Meltzer's Decoded
- Breaking Mysterious
- Breaking Vegas
- The Cars That Made America
- The Century: America's Time
- The Century of Warfare
- Chasing Mummies
- Christianity: The First Thousand Years
- Christianity: The Second Thousand Years
- Cities of the Underworld
- Civil War Combat
- Civil War Journal
- Clash of the Gods
- Cocaine: History Between the Lines
- Cola Wars
- The Cole Conspiracy
- Color of War
- Columbus: The Lost Voyage
- Comets: Prophets of Doom
- Comic Book Superheroes Unmasked
- Command Decisions
- The Conquerors
- Conquest
- Conquest of America
- Conspiracy?
- Countdown to Ground Zero
- The Crusades: Crescent and the Cross
- Cowboys and Outlaws
- Custer's Last Man (I Survived Little Bighorn)
- Da Vinci and the Code He Lived By
- The Dark Ages
- Dark Marvels
- Day After Disaster
- The Day the Towers Fell
- Days That Shaped America
- Dead Men's Secrets
- Death Road
- Decisive Battles
- Declassified
- Deep Sea Detectives
- Digging for the Truth
- Dinosaurs Unearthed
- Disasters of the Century
- A Distant Shore: African Americans of D-Day
- Dogfights
- Double 'F'
- Eating History
- Einstein
- Engineering Disasters
- Engineering an Empire
- Evolve
- Exorcism: Driving Out the Devil
- Extreme History with Roger Daltrey
- Extreme Trains
- Fabulous Treasures
- Fact to Film
- The Fast History Of...
- Failure Is Not an Option
- FDR: A Presidency Revealed
- Fight the Power: The Movements That Changed America
- First Apocalypse
- The First Days of Christianity
- First Invasion: The War of 1812
- First to Fight: The Black Tankers of WWII
- Food Tech
- The Food That Built America Snack Sized
- Fort Knox: Secrets Revealed
- Founding Brothers
- Founding Fathers
- The French Revolution
- Gangland
- Gangland Chronicles
- Gates of Hell
- George Washington: Father of His Country
- Gerald Ford: A Man and His Moment
- Gettysburg
- God vs. Satan
- The Godfather Legacy
- Gods and Goddesses
- The Great American History Quiz
- Great Crimes and Trials
- Great Escapes with Morgan Freeman
- Great Military Blunders
- The Great Ships
- The Great War
- Grounded on 9/11
- Hard Truths of Conservation
- The Harlem Hellfighters: Unsung Heroes
- The Haunted History of Halloween
- Heavy Metal
- Heroes Under Fire
- Hidden Cities
- Hidden House History
- High Hitler
- High Points in History
- Hillbilly: The Real Story
- History Alive
- History Films
- History in Color
- History Now
- History of Angels
- A History of Britain
- A History of God
- History of the Joke
- The History of Sex
- History Rocks
- History Undercover
- History vs. Hollywood
- History's Business
- History's Crazy Rich Ancients
- History's Greatest Heists with Pierce Brosnan
- History's Greatest of All Time with Peyton Manning
- History's Lost & Found
- History's Most Shocking
- History's Turning Points
- Hitler and Stalin: Roots of Evil
- Hitler and the Occult
- Hitler's Family
- Hitler's Generals
- Hitler's Henchmen
- Hitler's Women
- The Holy Grail
- Holy Marvels with Dennis Quaid
- Home for the Holidays: The History of Thanksgiving
- Honor Deferred
- Hooked: Illegal Drugs & How They Got That Way
- Hotel Ground Zero
- Houdini: Unlocking the Mystery
- How Bruce Lee Changed the World
- How Disney Built America
- How the Earth Was Made
- How Life Began
- How the States Got Their Shapes
- How William Shatner Changed the World
- Hunting History with Steven Rinella
- I Am Alive: Surviving the Andes Plane Crash
- I Love the 1880s
- I Was There
- Icons of Power
- The Icons That Built America
- In Search of History
- Incredible but True?
- Indiana Jones and the Ultimate Quest
- Inside Islam
- Inspector America
- Invention USA
- Investigating History
- It's Good to Be President
- Jefferson
- Jesus: The Lost 40 Days
- JFK: 3 Shots That Changed America
- JFK Assassination: The Definitive Guide
- JFK: A Presidency Revealed
- Jim Thorpe: Lit By Lightning
- Journey to 10,000 BC
- Jumbo Movies
- Jurassic Fight Club
- The Kennedy Assassination: 24 Hours After
- The Kennedy Assassination: Beyond Conspiracy
- Kennedys: The Curse of Power
- Kevin Costner's The West
- King
- The Ku Klux Klan: A Secret History
- The Last Days of World War II
- Last Stand of the 300
- Lee and Grant
- Lee Harvey Oswald: 48 Hours to Live
- Legacy of Star Wars
- Liberty's Kids
- The Lincoln Assassination
- Live From '69: Moon Landing
- Lock n' Load with R. Lee Ermey
- The Long March
- The Lost Evidence
- The Lost Kennedy Home Movies
- Lost Magic Decoded
- Lost U-Boats of WWII
- Lost Worlds
- The Machines That Built America
- Mail Call
- Making the 9/11 Memorial
- Making a Buck
- Man, Moment, Machine
- Man vs. History
- The Man Who Predicted 9/11
- Mankind Decoded
- Mankind: The Story of All of Us
- Manson
- Marijuana: A Chronic History
- Marked
- Mavericks, Miracles & Medicine
- Mega Disasters
- Mega Movers
- The Men Who Killed Kennedy
- The Miracle of Stairway B
- Modern Marvels
- Modern Marvels: WWII
- Moonshot
- More Sex in the Civil War
- The Most
- Motorheads
- Movies in Time
- Navy SEALs: America’s Secret Warriors
- Nazi America: A Secret History
- Nazi Titanic
- The Next Big Bang
- Night Class
- Nixon: The Arrogance of Power
- Nixon: A Presidency Revealed
- The Obama Years: A Nine-Part Oral History
- The Occult History of the Third Reich
- Our Century
- Patton 360°
- Pearl Harbor: 24 Hours After
- Pearl Harbor: The Truth
- The People Speak
- The Plague
- Predator X
- Presidential Prophecies
- The Presidents
- The President's Book of Secrets
- Prison Chronicles
- The Proof Is Out There: Military Mysteries
- Quest for King Arthur
- Rats, Bats & Bugs
- The Real Face of Jesus?
- The Real Scorpion King
- The Real Story of Christmas
- The Real Story of Halloween
- The Real Story of Thanksgiving
- The Real West
- Reel to Real
- Return of the Pirates
- Revealed: The Hunt for Bin Laden
- Revelation: The End of Days
- Rise and Fall of the Berlin Wall
- The Rise and Fall of the Roman Empire
- Rise and Fall: The World Trade Center
- Rise Up: The Movement that Changed America
- Roanoke: Search for the Lost Colony
- Rome: Engineering an Empire
- Rome: Rise and Fall of an Empire
- Rommel
- Ronald Reagan
- Ronald Reagan: A Legacy Remembered
- Russia, Land of the Tsars
- Sahara (TV series)|Sahara
- The St. Valentine's Day Massacre
- Sandhogs
- Save Our History
- Secret Access: Air Force One
- Secret Societies
- Secrets of Christianity
- Secrets of the Founding Fathers
- Secrets of War
- The Selection: Special Operations Experiment
- Seven Deadly Sins
- Sex in the Ancient World
- Shadow Force
- Sharpshooters
- Siberia: How the East Was Won
- Sherman's March
- Shockwave
- Shootout!
- Sliced
- Sniper: Inside the Crosshairs
- Spy Web
- Stan Lee's Superhumans
- Star Trek: Beyond the Final Frontier
- Star Wars: The Legacy Revealed
- Star Wars Tech
- The States
- The Story of Anthony Adegoke: The Legend
- Street Gangs: A Secret History
- Strip the City
- Strip the Cosmos
- Style Icon
- Suicide Missions
- Superhuman
- Surviving History
- Tactical to Practical
- Tales of the Gun
- Tales From Oak Island
- Targeted
- Tech Effect
- Tech Force
- The Ten Commandments
- That's Impossible
- THC Classroom
- Third Reich: The Fall
- Third Reich: The Rise
- This Week in History
- Titanic at 100: Mystery Solved
- Titanic's Final Moments: Missing Pieces
- Titanic's Tragic Sister
- To the Best of My Ability
- Tora, Tora, Tora: The Real Story of Pearl Harbor
- The Toys That Built America
- TR – An American Lion
- Trains Unlimited
- Triumph: Jesse Owens and the Berlin Olympics
- True Action Adventures
- True Caribbean Pirates
- The True Story of Alexander the Great
- The True Story of Hannibal
- Tulsa Burning: The 1921 Race Massacre
- Tuskegee Airmen: Legacy of Courage
- Underwater Universe
- Unforgettables
- United Stats of America
- The Universe
- Unsung Heroes of Pearl Harbor
- Valkyrie: The Plot to Kill Hitler
- Vanishings
- Vietnam in HD
- Voices from Inside the Towers
- Warrior Queen Boudica
- Warriors
- Watergate
- We Can Make You Talk
- Weapons at War
- Weird Warfare
- What's the Earth Worth?
- Where Did It Come From?
- The White House: Behind Closed Doors
- Who Wrote the Bible
- Wild West Tech
- Witch Hunt
- Woodstock
- The Works
- The World Trade Center: Rise and Fall of an American Icon
- World War II from Space
- WWII in HD
- The XY Factor
- Year-by-Year
- You Don't Know Dixie
- Zero Hour

==== Reality ====
- Alaska Off-Road Warriors
- Alone: Frozen
- Alone: The Skills Challenge
- American Daredevils
- American Restoration
- Apocalypse Man
- Apocalypse PA
- Appalachian Outlaws
- Around the World in 80 Ways
- Assembly Required
- Auto-Maniac
- Ax Men
- Beyond Oak Island
- Beyond Skinwalker Ranch
- Big Easy Motors
- Big Shrimpin'
- The Butcher
- Cajun Pawn Stars
- Counting Cars
- The Curse of Civil War Gold
- The Death Coast
- Dirty Old Cars
- Down East Dickering
- The Einstein Challenge
- Expedition Africa
- Extreme Marksmen
- Full Metal Jousting
- Full Throttle
- Fully Torqued
- God, Guns & Automobiles
- Guts + Bolts
- Hairy Bikers
- Harvest
- Herbert Bail Bonds
- History IQ
- Human Weapon
- Iron & Fire
- IRT Deadliest Roads
- It's How You Get There
- Kings of Pain
- Lost Gold of the Aztecs
- MadHouse
- More Extreme Marksmen
- More Power
- Mountain Men: Ultimate Marksman
- Mounted in Alaska
- Mud Men
- Only in America with Larry the Cable Guy
- Ozzy & Jack's World Detour
- Pawn Stars Do America
- Power & Ice
- Real Deal
- Secret Restoration
- Shark Wranglers
- Smartest Guy In The Room
- The Strongest Man in History
- Sold!
- Swamp Mysteries With Troy Landry
- Swamp People: Serpent Invasion
- ThingamaBob
- Top Gear
- Top Shot
- Tougher in Alaska
- Weird U.S.

==== UFO/Paranormal ====
- Decoding the Past
- Hangar 1: The UFO Files
- Haunted History
- History's Mysteries
- In Search of...
- Missing in Alaska
- MonsterQuest
- MysteryQuest
- Nostradamus Effect
- Unidentified: Inside America's UFO Investigation
- UFO Files
- UFO Hunters
- The UnXplained: Mysteries of the Universe
