= List of Digging for the Truth episodes =

Digging for the Truth was a History Channel television series. There were 4 seasons aired from 2005-2007. Seasons 1-3 of the show focused on host Josh Bernstein, who was replaced by Hunter Ellis for Season 4.

== Episodes ==
=== Season One - 13 episodes - premiered on 24 January 2005 ===
1. Who Built Egypt's Pyramids?
2. Pompeii Secrets Revealed
3. Hunt for the Lost Ark
4. The Holy Grail
5. The Iceman Cometh
6. Quest for King Solomon's Gold
7. Passage to the Maya Underworld
8. The Lost Tribe of Israel
9. Secrets of the Nazca Lines
10. The Search for El Dorado
11. Giants of Easter Island
12. Mystery of the Anasazi
13. Nefertiti: The Mummy Returns

=== Season Two - 13 episodes - premiered on 23 January 2006 ===
1. The Real Temple of Doom
2. America's Pyramids
3. Stonehenge Secrets Revealed
4. The Vikings: Voyage to America
5. Roanoke: The Lost Colony
6. Cleopatra: The Last Pharaoh
7. City of the Gods - Teotihuacan
8. The Real Queen of Sheba
9. Troy: Of Gods and Warriors
10. The Da Vinci Code: Bloodlines
11. The Giants of Patagonia
12. The Real Sin City: Sodom and Gomorrah
13. The Lost Cities of the Amazon

=== Season Three - 20 episodes - premiered on 22 January 2007 ===
1. Atlantis: New Revelations 2-hour Special
2. Lost Empire Of Genghis Khan
3. King Tut Secrets Revealed
4. New Maya Revelations
5. Ramesses II: Visions of Greatness
6. Machu Picchu
7. Secrets of Mummies
8. Lost Treasures of Petra
9. Stonehenge of the Americas (Tiwanaku)
10. Lost Treasures of the Copper Scroll
11. The Aztecs
12. Searching for King David

=== Season Four - 8 episodes - premiered on 3 September 2007 ===
1. Mummies of the Clouds
2. The Hunley: New Revelations
3. Kings of the Stone Age
4. Pirates: Terror in the Mediterranean
5. God's Gold, Part 1
6. God's Gold, Part 2
7. Timbuktu
8. Angkor Wat: Eighth Wonder of the World
