= UFO Files (TV series) =

- Genre: Documentary
- Country of origin: United States
- Original language: English
- No. of episodes: 46 (inc. 2-part episodes)

Production
- Running time: 45 minutes
- Production companies: Weller/Grossman Productions, Inc.

Original release
- Network: History Channel
- Release: July 5, 2004 – October 5, 2007

Related
- UFO Hunters (2008–09)

UFO Files is an American television series that was produced from 2004 to 2007 for the History Channel. The program covers the phenomena of unidentified flying and submerged objects, close encounters with alleged extraterrestrial life, and alleged military and government cover-up conspiracies.

In 2008, a following series called UFO Hunters premiered on the same channel.

== Interviews ==
Some of the scientists and experts that have been interviewed in the series are:

- Dennis Balthaser – ufologist
- William J. Birnes – author, publisher, and ufologist
- Phyllis Budinger – research scientist
- James Clarkson – former police detective, ufologist
- Robert Collins – author of Exempt from Disclosure
- Paul Davids – television, science fiction writer and director
- Frank Drake – astrophysicist
- Stanton T. Friedman – ufologist
- John Greenewald Jr. – creator of The Black Vault website
- Steven M. Greer – physician and ufologist
- David M. Jacobs – author, abduction hypnotherapists, ufologist, and professor
- Michio Kaku – theoretical physicist and futurist
- Andrew Kissner – former New Mexico state representative
- George Knapp – paranormal journalist
- Lawrence M. Krauss – physicist
- Geoffrey A. Landis – MIT professor, scientist and science fiction writer
- Dr. Roger K. Leir – podiatric surgeon, implant investigator
- Bruce Maccabee – optical physicist and ufologist
- Herb Maursatd – sheriff
- Ted Phillips – ufologist
- Scott Ramsey – author, lead investigator for Aztec UFO crash
- Chris Rutkowski – ufologist, educator
- John F. Schuessler – founding member of MUFON
- Seth Shostak – physicist and astronomer

== Episodes ==
=== Season 1 (2004) ===
Title	Original airdate	Summary
"UFO Hot Spots"	July 5, 2004	An investigation into areas of the world where UFO activity is prevalent and the theories of what makes them attractive to the phenomena.
"When UFOs Arrive"	July 19, 2004	An examination of secretive government policies for dealing with extraterrestrial visitation – from the military reporting guideline "JANAP-146", to a curious chapter in a FEMA disaster guide on what to do in case of a UFO crash.
"UFOs in the Bible"	July 26, 2004	This episode looks into possible otherworldly activity as documented in the passages of the Bible.
"Roswell: Final Declassification"	August 2, 2004	A look at a 2001 investigation into the National Archives to review recently declassified military documents that could shed official insight on what really happened during the Roswell incident.
"Crop Circle Controversy"	August 9, 2004	A look at the phenomena of crop circles – from a 1678 woodcarving of "mowing devils" to the growing occurrences of present-day formations both in complexity and number.
"Area 51: Beyond Top Secret"	August 30, 2004	An investigation into the activity surrounding the top secret facility in Nevada known as Area 51 – looking into its history in developing advanced military aircraft and rumors it is reverse engineering alien spacecraft.
"UFOs: Then and Now? The Innocent Years"	September 17, 2004	A review of what some say is evidence of UFO encounters through mankind's history – from prehistoric cave paintings, to Medieval frescoes, to Renaissance art that depict strange objects in the sky.
"Soviet UFO Secrets Revealed"	September 20, 2004	This documentary delves into some of the most bizarre UFO reports in Soviet Russian history and investigates rumors of a treasure trove of KGB UFO documents that remain top secret.
"UFOs: Then and Now? Cause for Alarm"	October 4, 2004	A review of famous UFO events: the 1947 Roswell, New Mexico crash; the 1952 Washington, D.C., mass sighting; the 1967 Shag Harbour, Nova Scotia and 1980 RAF Bentwaters incidents.
"UFOs: Then and Now? Nightmare"	October 11, 2004	A study of the famous 1961 Betty and Barney Hill and 1976 Allagash, Maine alien abduction cases.
"UFOs: Then and Now? Aliens and Contact"	October 18, 2004	Investigation into the 1991 mass UFO sighting over Mexico City during a solar eclipse and other sightings as possible examples of alien contact with the inhabitants of planet Earth.
"Secret UFO Files"	November 6, 2004	An examination recently declassified documents in the CIA archives, in an attempt to uncover a half-century of suppressed, distorted, and even fabricated reports of UFO sightings.
"Cattle Mutilations"	November 29, 2004	A delve into the bizarre reports of cattle mutilation - the alleged surgically precise slaughter of livestock through unexplained means and the rumors aliens or a secret military operation could be responsible.
"The Gray's Agenda"	December 6, 2004	This episode looks into the most iconic aliens in popular culture – the Greys – and if in fact they exist, what their plan could be for mankind and the future of our planet.
"China's Roswell"	December 13, 2004	Investigation into the mystery of the Dropa Stones, claimed to be a series of 716 stone disks said to contain alien hieroglyphs found in a cave in China's Bayan Har Mountains.

=== Season 2 (2005) ===
Title	Original airdate	Summary
"Ancient Aliens"	February 14, 2005	The show investigates ancient ruins, artifacts, and texts that may hold evidence that past human civilizations may have been contacted by or had close encounters with extraterrestrial beings.
"Area 51"	February 26, 2005	This episode looks into the secretive military facility known as Area 51, and a focus on Bob Lazar, a physicist who claimed to have worked at the installation and revealed secrets of experimental aircraft projects designed around the reverse engineering of alien technology.
"Britain's X-Files"	April 25, 2005	A delve into the secret files of Britain's Prime Ministers, former RAF officers, and even the Royal Family, in search of what they know about the bizarre and intriguing history of Britain's UFO phenomenon.
"Kecksburg UFO"	June 6, 2005	A documentary into the supposed 1965 crash of an acorn-shaped object in Kecksburg, Pennsylvania that was supposedly recovered by the military and the cover up that followed.
"Majestic 12: UFO Cover Up"	June 20, 2005	The episode takes a look at the top secret government committee appointed by President Harry S. Truman – Majestic 12, which is said to be responsible for the recovery, storage and analysis of UFO technology.
"The Day After Roswell"	June 27, 2005	This episode investigates the story of U.S. Army Lt. Col Philip J. Corso, who claims in a book that he was given alien technology from the 1947 Roswell incident and lead secret projects to jump start advancements in lasers, fiber optics, night vision, and the integrated circuit.
"UFO Hunters"	July 18, 2005	A review of the history, the methods, the technology, and the scientific pioneers in the search for extraterrestrial life. The episode drew enough critical success that History green-lighted the UFO Hunters spin-off series which premiered in 2008.
"UFOs and the White House"	July 25, 2005	This program delves into the Presidential libraries in an attempt to uncover evidence of 50-years of alleged Oval office involvement in the existence of UFOs.
"Russian Roswell"	October 31, 2005	A look into that activities of Kapustin Yar – a remote, top secret, military development and test facility in Russia and said to be the former Soviet Union's version of Area 51.
"Real UFOs"	November 14, 2005	A review of strange experimental aircraft made by the Nazis, the Russians, and the United States, that some speculate were designed by reverse engineering alien technology.
"Beyond the War of the Worlds"	November 21, 2005	A look at mankind's fascination of the possible life on Mars and fear of alien invasion – starting with the 1896 book The War of the Worlds by H. G. Wells, to the 1938 radio broadcast by Orson Welles that panicked millions, to what spawned a little-known invasion panic in upstate New York in 1968.
"Texas' Roswell"	December 12, 2005	An investigation into an 1897 case where an alleged UFO crashed in Aurora, Texas and the subsequent funeral and burial of the alien "pilot" in the town's graveyard.
"Mexico's Roswell"	December 12, 2005	A look into the 1974 UFO crash incident in Coyame, Chihuahua, Mexico, where the retrieval of crash material was subsequently covered up by Mexican authorities.
"Brazil's Roswell"	December 17, 2005	An investigation into the 1977 reports of UFO activity over Colares, Brazil where locals were said to have been physically zapped by beams from flying disks over a period of two months, and the Brazilian government was said to have suppressed video and photographic evidence.
"Britain's Roswell"	December 17, 2005	A look at the famous Christmas 1980, Rendlesham Forest incident where a UFO reportedly buzzed a top security NATO military base that was said to store nuclear weapons.

=== Season 3 (2006) ===
Title	Original airdate	Summary
"Out of This World"	January 9, 2006	An attempt to answer the questions: "Are we alone in the universe?"; "Is Earth doomed by a stellar catastrophe?"; "Did extra-terrestrials have a hand in human development?"; and "What do the governments of the world know about life outside this planet?"
"Deep Sea UFOs"	January 23, 2006	A look at reports of USOs "Unidentified Submerged Objects", throughout history – from the ancient legends of Atlantis, to the reports of Christopher Columbus, to modern sightings around Laguna Cartagena, Puerto Rico (a supposed USO hot bed).
"Alien Engineering, Part 1"	February 6, 2006	Using real science, this episode takes a look into the possible theories of how alien craft could operate – from the propulsion systems, to levitation, to teleportation, and faster-than-light travel.
"Alien Engineering, Part 2"	February 13, 2006	A continuation of the previous episode – a real-world look into how alien technology could possibly operate.
"Canada's Roswell"	March 10, 2006	An investigation into the 1967 Shag Harbour, Nova Scotia incident where a UFO was reportedly seen entering and traveling underwater which alerted a nearby U.S./Canadian submarine base.
"UFO Cults"	April 10, 2006	A look into UFO/alien-worshiping religious cults, such as Heaven's Gate and others whose members believe extraterrestrials have a plan for mankind.
"UFOs vs. The Government"	May 24, 2006	A look at what the governments of the United States, England, and Belgium could know about the existence of UFOs, and studies what some say is smoking gun evidence of a web of secrecy.
"Deep Sea UFOs: Red Alert"	July 10, 2006	A continued investigation into the "USO" phenomena, studying a 1992 incident off Catalina Island near Los Angeles to the continual UFO/USO activity surrounding the USS Roosevelt during her 20-year service.
"An Alien History of Planet Earth"	June 26, 2006	A study of various landmark UFO encounters, from World War II to the 1990s, and a look at rumors of classified military aircraft incorporating alien technology into their designs. This is a two-part episode.
"Black Box UFO Secrets"	August 7, 2006	An analysis of black box and control tower tapes recorded during alleged UFO encounters, including NASA video footage.
"The Pacific Bermuda Triangle"	September 4, 2006	This documentary covers the "Dragon's Triangle", a region south of Japan in the Philippine Sea where, like the infamous Bermuda Triangle, ships and planes have gone missing.
"Hangar 18: The UFO Warehouse"	November 6, 2006	An investigation of the mysterious "Hangar 18" facility located at Wright-Patterson Air Force Base in Dayton, Ohio, where some believe the military keeps UFO wreckage and alien bodies.
"Alien Encounters"	December 4, 2006	An examination of what ufology calls "trace cases", where physical material from a strange encounter is analyzed to determine if it is evidence of an alien contact.

=== Season 4 (2007) ===
Title	Original airdate	Summary
"UFOs of the 70's"	May 29, 2007	This episode explores the biggest decade of UFO activity – the 1970s, when a renewed interest in UFOs was born from the growing reports of sighting and abductions, from Delphos, Kansas to Roswell, New Mexico. This episode is a composite of two episodes including segments from Alien Encounters.
"Alien Hunters"	October 5, 2007	This episode looks at the history of our search for extraterrestrial life, explaining the technologies used, introducing the pioneers and revealing the most promising discoveries.
"Roswell: Secrets Unveiled"	N/A	This episode looks back at the famous Roswell incident which for many, marked the beginning of an era of UFO conspiracies and government cover-ups. It looks at arguments presented by both sides and weighs the evidence in an attempt to reveal what really happened in July 1947.

== DVD release ==
UFO Files is available on a DVD set that is a collection of eight selected episodes. Individual episodes can also be obtained at the History Online Store.

== See also ==
- List of topics characterized as pseudoscience
- UFO Hunters
- Hangar 1: The UFO Files
- Unidentified flying object (UFO)
