= Boneyard =

Boneyard may refer to:

- Cemetery or graveyard

== Comics ==
- A character in the Malibu/Marvel Comics publication Mantra
- Boneyard (comics), a horror-themed comic book series by Richard Moore

== Film and television ==
- Boneyard (TV series), a History Channel TV series that documented vehicle boneyards
- The Boneyard, a 1991 direct-to-video horror film directed by James Cummins
- Boneyard (film), a 2024 crime thriller film starring Mel Gibson and Curtis Jackson

== Geography ==
- Boneyard Creek, a stream in Champaign County, Illinois, United States

== Music ==
- Ozzy's Boneyard, a classic hard rock music channel on Sirius XM Radio, previously known as "The Boneyard"
- An early 1990s Los Angeles glam-metal band featuring Chris Van Dahl
- A Rhode Island band featuring Gail Greenwood
- Joe Perry Boneyard Les Paul, a model guitar model endorsed by Joe Perry of Aerosmith
- BoneYard, a persona of the poet and musician Alan Pizzarelli
- "Boneyard", a song by Impetigo from Horror of the Zombies
- "Boneyard", a song by Little Angels from Young Gods
- "Boneyard", a song by Wolfheart from Tyhjyys
- "Boneyards", a song by Parkway Drive from Horizons
- "Bone Yard", a song by Vermillion Lies
- Boneyard AKA Fearmonger, an EP by Underscores

== Other uses ==
- Aircraft boneyard, list of retired aircraft storage facilities
- Boneyard (dominoes), the stock of tiles in dominoes from which the players draw.
- The Boneyard (Disney's Animal Kingdom), a dinosaur dig-site themed playground attractions at Disney's Animal Kingdom
- The Boneyard (Universal Studios Florida), a former attraction at Universal Studios Florida
- A place for the storage or cannibalization of retired vehicles or machinery; see Aircraft boneyard
- Boo's Boneyard Galaxy, a galaxy in the video game Super Mario Galaxy
- Boneyard Beach (disambiguation)
