= Thingamabob (disambiguation) =

Thingamabob is a placeholder name.

Thingamabob may also refer to:

- "The Thing-Ummy Bob", a 1942 song celebrating female production-line workers of World War II
- ThingamaBob, a science entertainment television series
- Thingumy and Bob, Moomin characters
