= Digging for the Truth =

- Series DVD cover - Season One
- Starring: Josh Bernstein (Seasons 1–3); Hunter Ellis (Season 4)
- Country of origin: United States
- No. of seasons: 4
- No. of episodes: 54

Production
- Running time: 60 minutes

Original release
- Network: History Channel
- Release: January 24, 2005 – October 29, 2007

Digging for the Truth is a scripted History Channel television series documentary that ran from 2005 to 2007. The show had a total of 54 episodes over 4 seasons that were each an hour long. The first three seasons of the show focused on host Josh Bernstein, who journeyed on various explorations of historical icons and mysteries. Bernstein was the president and CEO of BOSS (Boulder Outdoor Survival School) and has a degree in anthropology and psychology from Cornell University. The show aired Monday nights at 9:00 EST on the History Channel. The series premiered on 24 January 2005 and had a total of 13 episodes. At the time the show was the highest-rated series currently running on The History Channel. The second season premiered on 23 January 2006 and had a total of 13 episodes. The third season premiered on 22 January 2007 with a two-hour special episode on the quest for Atlantis and had a total of 20 episodes. The fourth season was the final season and premiered 8 September 2007 with a total of 8 episodes.

Bernstein announced on 20 February 2007 that he would be leaving The History Channel and Digging for the Truth and would join The Discovery Channel as an executive producer and host of a new prime-time series and specials in April 2007. Hunter Ellis, host of Tactical to Practical and Man, Moment, Machine for The History Channel, then replaced Bernstein as host for the final season of the series in 2007.

Each episode dealt with an event or subject in history that is a mystery or not completely understood by modern historians. Many of the topics covered are controversial in some respect. Bernstein would mention the various theories that exist on the subject, although the episode may not have explored all of them. He then traveled to various locations to ask questions of researchers, and he often he put himself into situations (e.g., working in a quarry, climbing a rock-face) that simulated the activities of people in the period he explored. Almost all of the researchers he talked to were professionals in the subject at hand, and many of the places he visited (e.g., the inside of a pyramid) are not open to the general public. At the end of each episode, he pulled together everything discussed in the episode to either formulate a hypothesis of what happened or to conclude that what happened remains a mystery.

In late 2006, Bernstein's book Digging for the Truth: One Man's Epic Adventure Exploring the World's Greatest Archaeological Mysteries was published. In the book, Bernstein writes a bit about his past and BOSS, but was mainly focused on adventures he took, many of which were episodes of the series.
