= Secrets of War =

- Genre: Documentary
- Narrated by: Charlton Heston
- Composer: Ramón Balcázar
- Country of origin: United States
- Original language: English

Production
- Executive producers: Alan Beattie; Chris Chesser
- Running time: 45 min.
- Production company: Documedia

Original release
- Network: History Channel
- Release: July 14, 1998 – March 7, 2003

Secrets of War is a documentary television series about military history and the secrets of war of the 20th century. It is edited as 65 episodes. The series premiered on the History Channel in July 1998 where it prevailed in the 8 o'clock Sunday evening slot for over two years. The series was co-created by Supervising Producers John Corry and Chip Proser. Alan Beattie and Chris Chesser served as Executive Producers. Original musical score composed and conducted by Ramón Balcázar.

Narrated by Charlton Heston, the series details facts and information derived from rare archival footage, formerly classified documents and messages, coupled with interviews with experts, authors and eyewitnesses from all over the world.

== Production notes ==
The series was originally conceived as a 26-hour production. The first 13 hours concentrated on World War II, and the vast amount of unknown history kept secret by the British Official Secrets Act and finally revealed from 1975 to the 1990s. The second 13 hours focused on other conflicts of the 20th century. After the success of the first season, Documedia proceeded to expand the series comprehensively to address other wars, battles and intrigues, including many colour present-day shows on topics as diverse as chemical weapons and spy planes, and theme-oriented episodes like prisoners of war and code breakers.

The series interviewed key participants in all of the important conflicts of the 20th century, including prominent authors with unique perspectives of the clandestine aspects of war. The creators of Sworn To Secrecy worked with the top spies of the era: former Directors of the CIA James Woolsey, Richard Helms and Dr. James Schlesinger; former Chairmen of the KGB Generals Vladimir Semichastny and Alexander Shelepin (Russia); as well as former directors of the MOSSAD Meir Amit and Isser Harel.

As Secrets of War gained notoriety, other VIPs who usually avoided commenting on the topics explored by the series participated in this unique documentary production, including: Henry Kissinger, Robert McNamara, Dan Quayle, John H. Sununu, James A. Baker III, Jack Valenti, Howard K. Smith, John K. Singlaub, David Eisenhower, Dr. Sergei Khrushchev, Arthur Schlesinger, Jr., and Senator John McCain. Each one-hour episode tells a factual story backed up by interviews, rare footage, 3D graphics, on-location shooting, historical retracing shots, and extensive reenactments.

Secrets of War is, among many documentary series of its kind, used in the classrooms of the United States Naval Academy and United States Air Force Academy, and the only military series that American Forces Network (formerly the Armed Forces Radio and Television Service) licenses for American servicemen and women on military bases and ships worldwide.
