= Kecksburg UFO incident =

1965 fireball sighting in North America

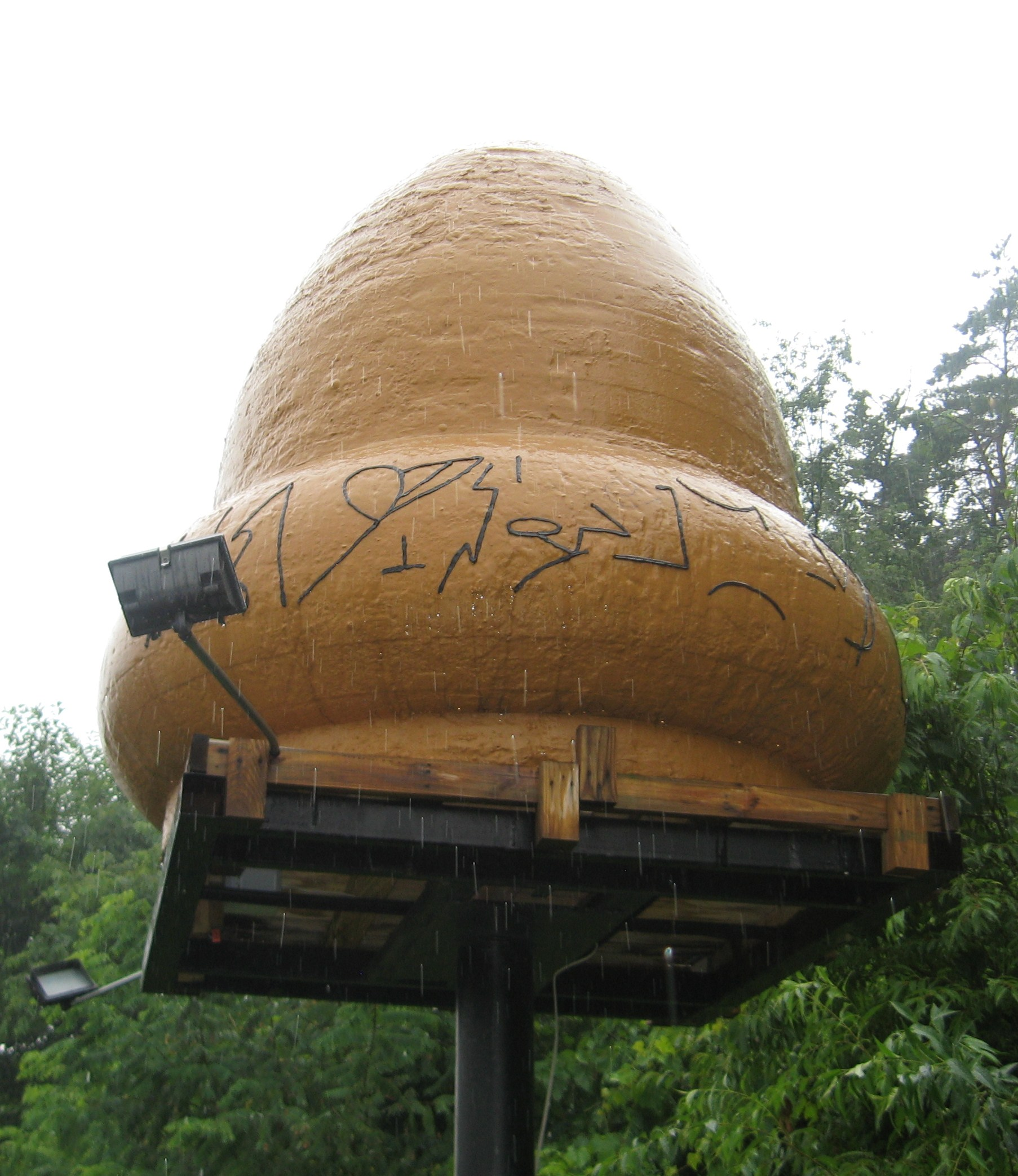
A model of the alleged object, created for Unsolved Mysteries, is on display near the Kecksburg fire station.

The Kecksburg UFO incident occurred on December 9, 1965, at Kecksburg, Pennsylvania, United States, when a fireball was reported by citizens of six U.S. states and Canada over Detroit, Michigan, and Windsor, Ontario. Astronomer John Balafoutas said it was likely to have been a meteor bolide burning up in the atmosphere and descending at a steep angle. NASA released a statement in 2005 reporting that experts had examined fragments from the area and determined they were from a Soviet satellite, but those original records were lost in 1987. NASA responded to court orders and Freedom of Information Act requests to search for the records. The incident gained wide notoriety in popular culture and ufology, with speculation ranging from extraterrestrial craft to debris from the Soviet space probe Kosmos 96, and is often called "Pennsylvania's Roswell".

== Initial reports ==
On the evening of December 9, 1965, a large, brilliant fireball was seen in Idaho, Indiana, Ohio, Pennsylvania, West Virginia, and New York as it streaked over the Detroit, Michigan–Windsor, Ontario area. Reports of hot metal debris over Michigan and northern Ohio, grass fires, and sonic booms in the Pittsburgh metropolitan area were attributed to the fireball. Some people in the village of Kecksburg, about 30 miles (48 km) southeast of Pittsburgh, reported wisps of blue smoke, vibrations, and a "thump", and also that something from the sky had crashed in the woods.

An early article in the Greensburg Tribune-Review stated the following:

The area where the object landed was immediately sealed off on the order of U.S. Army and State Police officials, in anticipation of a "close inspection" of whatever may have fallen ... State Police officials there ordered the area roped off to await the expected arrival of both U.S. Army engineers and possibly, civilian scientists.

When state troopers and Air Force personnel searched the woods, they found "absolutely nothing". A subsequent edition in the Tribune-Review bore the headline "Searchers Fail to Find Object".

Authorities discounted proposed explanations such as a plane crash, errant missile test, or reentering satellite debris and generally assumed it to be a meteor. Astronomer Paul Annear said the fireball was likely to have been a meteor entering the Earth's atmosphere. Geophysicist George Wetherill discounted speculations that it was debris from a satellite and agreed that the reports were probably due to a meteor. Astronomers William P. Bidelman and Fred Hess said it undoubtedly was a meteor bolide. A spokesman for the Department of Defense in Washington said first reports indicated the reported fireball was a natural phenomenon.

The February 1966 issue of Sky & Telescope reported that the fireball was seen over the Detroit-Windsor area at about 4:44 p.m. EST. The Federal Aviation Administration received 23 reports from aircraft pilots, starting at 4:44 p.m. A seismograph 25 miles (40 km) southwest of Detroit recorded shock waves created by the fireball as it passed through the atmosphere. The Sky & Telescope article concluded that "the path of the fireball extended roughly from northwest to southeast" and ended "in or near the western part of Lake Erie".

== Scientific articles ==
Location of Kecksburg, Pennsylvania

Several articles were written about the fireball in science journals. A 1967 article by two astronomers in the Journal of the Royal Astronomical Society of Canada (JRASC) used the seismographic record to pinpoint the time of passage over the Detroit area to 4:43 p.m. In addition, they used photographs of the trail taken north of Detroit at two different locations to triangulate the trajectory of the object. They concluded that the fireball was descending at a steep angle, moving from the southwest to the northeast, and likely impacted on the northwestern shore of Lake Erie near Windsor, Ontario.

== NASA statements ==
In December 2005, just before the 40th anniversary of the Kecksburg incident, NASA released a statement reporting that experts had examined metallic fragments from the area and determined they were from a Soviet satellite that re-entered the atmosphere and broke up, but records of their findings were lost in the 1980s.

Leslie Kean, described as "an investigative reporter backed by the Sci-Fi Channel", reportedly "sued NASA under the Freedom of Information Act" for the lost NASA records. On October 26, 2007, NASA agreed to search for those records after being ordered by a court. During the hearing, Steve McConnell, NASA's public liaison officer, testified that two boxes of papers from the time of the Kecksburg incident were missing. Loss of records is not a unique case for NASA; for example, the original tapes recorded during the televised Apollo 11 Moon landing were misplaced or reused.

In 2008, space writer James Oberg suggested that NASA was unlikely to possess any such documents since, in his view, it was highly likely that the supposed NASA team that investigated the site were in fact Air Force personnel who identified themselves as NASA personnel, something regularly done by military personnel in civilian clothes during the 1960s. He further suggested that Kean's action was no more than a "publicity stunt" for the benefit of Kean's employers.

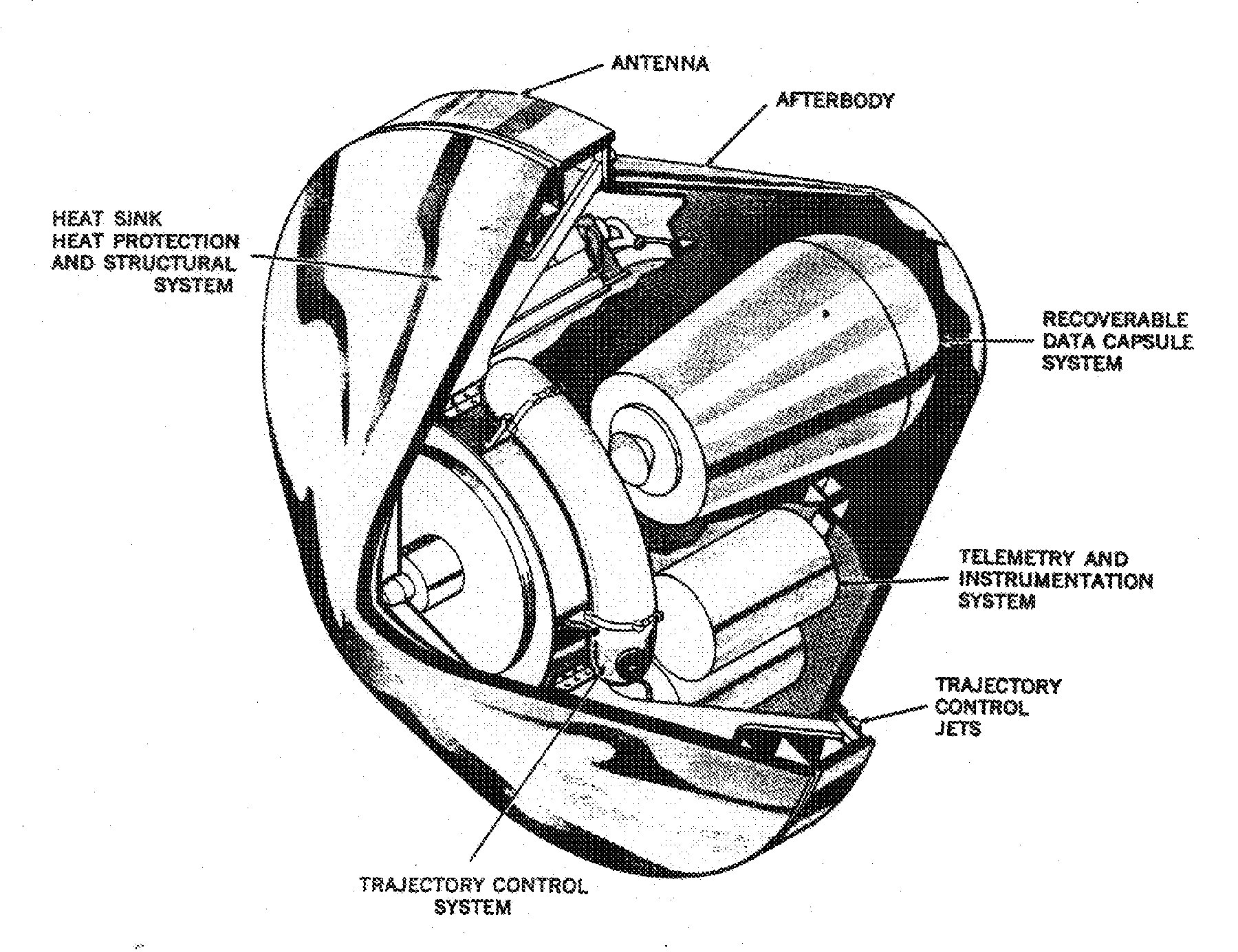
General Electric Mark 2 Re-entry Vehicle

According to John Ventre of MUFON and Shafton native Owen Eichler, their recent investigations have led them to speculate the object that reportedly landed in Kecksburg was "a General Electric Mark 2 Re-entry Vehicle that had been launched by the Air Force as a spy satellite, but fell out of orbit"; however, "we need confirmation from NASA or the Air Force".

More recent comments by NASA are less supportive of a link to a Soviet satellite:

There is some speculation that the reentry of the Cosmos 96/Venera-type spacecraft was responsible for a fireball which was seen over southwestern Ontario, Canada and at least eight states from Michigan to New York at 4:43 p.m. EST (21:43 UT) on 9 December 1965. Investigations of photographs and sightings of the fireball indicated its path through the atmosphere was probably too steep to be consistent with a spacecraft re-entering from Earth orbit and was more likely a meteor in a prograde orbit from the vicinity of the asteroid belt, and probably ended its flight over western Lake Erie. U.S. Air Force tracking data on Cosmos 96 also indicate the spacecraft orbit decayed earlier than 21:43 UT on 9 December. Other analyses of the spacecraft orbit definitively indicate it could not have been the Cosmos 96 spacecraft. Some unconfirmed reports state the fireball subsequently landed in Pennsylvania southeast of Pittsburgh near the town of Kecksburg (40.2 N, 79.5 W) at 4:46 p.m. EST

== Television and film ==
- In 1990, the NBC television show Unsolved Mysteries aired an episode partially devoted to the incident. Host Robert Stack was featured covering the incident and its aftermath.The episode suggested an extraterrestrial craft had crashed. It quoted local residents at the time who said they had found an object in the woods shaped like an acorn and about as large as a Volkswagen Beetle bearing writing resembling Egyptian hieroglyphs which was subsequently removed in a secret military operation. A prop from that show remains on display in the village.
- In 2003, the Sci Fi Channel aired a two-hour documentary, The New Roswell: Kecksburg Exposed, hosted by Bryant Gumbel. In it, Kecksburg resident John Hays says that as a 10-year-old boy, he saw a flat-bed truck emerging from the site near his house, carrying something "the size of a VW", an exact repetition of the claims he made in the first episode of Unsolved Mysteries, season 3, in 1990.
- In 2008, an episode of the Discovery Channel series Nazi UFO Conspiracy suggested the incident was the recovery of an alleged Nazi UFO called Die Glocke ("The Bell").
- In February 2009, the History Channel's UFO Hunters suggested a military conspiracy and cover-up related to the incident.
- In 2011, the History Channel's Ancient Aliens suggested the alleged Nazi secret weapon Die Glocke was recovered at Kecksburg, prompting a government conspiracy and cover-up.
- In 2014, Giorgio A. Tsoukalos with the History Channel's In Search of Aliens visited the supposed crash site, led by local UFO researcher Stan Gordon.
- On September 12, 2019, producer-director Cody Knotts premiered his film Kecksburg. It dramatizes the story of John Murphy, a reporter for local radio station WHJB who claimed to be the victim of a government conspiracy.
- Filmmaker Andrew Patterson has said that the plot of his 2019 film The Vast of Night was partially based on the Kecksburg incident.
- BBC Radio 4's 2024 drama series, Limelight: The Skies Are Watching, uses the Kecksburg incident as its inspiration.
- In the 2026 Steven Spielberg film Disclosure Day, the Kecksburg UFO incident is featured as part of a series of released government footage.

== See also ==
- List of UFO sightings
- UFO sightings in the United States
- Die Glocke (conspiracy theory)
