= Nazi UFOs =

Conspiracy theories alleging connections between UFOs and Nazi Germany

Nazi UFO
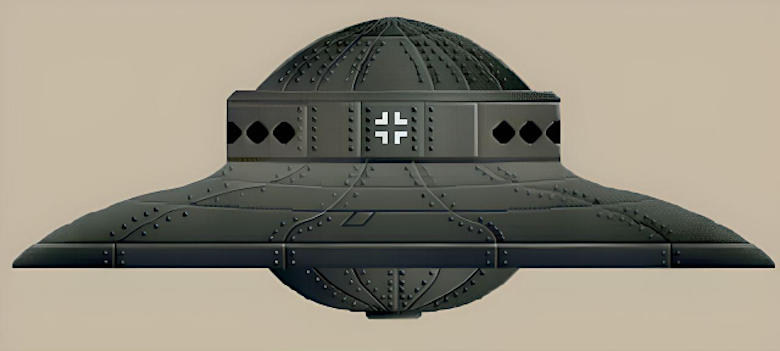
- Artistic impression of a Nazi flying saucer, similar in appearance to craft allegedly photographed by George Adamski, Reinhold Schmidt, Howard Menger, and Stephen Darbishire

General information
- Type: Alleged experimental flying disc
- National origin: Nazi Germany
- Manufacturer: Unknown; attributed to SS E-IV or Vril Society (unverified)
- Designer: Allegedly Schutzstaffel engineers and esoteric researchers
- Status: Unverified; speculative
- Primary user: Nazi Germany (purported)
- Number built: Unknown; believed to be a prototype only

History
- First flight: Allegedly 1943–1945 (no verified records)
- Developed from: Haunebu I
- Developed into: Haunebu III
- Preserved at: None known to exist
- Fate: Mythical or destroyed; no physical evidence

In Ufology, conspiracy theory, science fiction, and comic book stories, claims or stories have circulated linking UFOs to Nazi Germany. The German UFO theories describe supposedly successful attempts to develop advanced aircraft or spacecraft before and during World War II, further asserting the post-war survival of these craft in secret underground bases in Antarctica, South America, or the United States, along with their creators.

== Early UFOs as possible Nazi technology ==
During the Second World War, unusual sightings in the skies above Europe were often interpreted as novel Nazi technology. In the first years of the Cold War, Western nations speculated that unusual sightings might stem from Soviet deployment of captured or reverse-engineered Nazi technology.

=== Foo fighters ===
In World War II, the so-called "foo fighters", a variety of unusual and anomalous aerial phenomena, were witnessed by both Axis and Allied personnel. While some foo fighter reports were dismissed as the misperceptions of troops in the heat of combat, others were taken seriously, and leading scientists such as Luis Alvarez began to investigate them. In at least some cases, Allied intelligence and commanders suspected that foo fighters reported in the European theater represented advanced German aircraft or weapons, particularly given that Germans had already developed such technological innovations as V-1 and V-2 missiles and the first operational jet-powered Me 262 fighter planes. A minority of foo fighters seemed to have inflicted damage to allied aircraft.

=== Ghost rockets ===
Ghost rockets were rocket- or missile-shaped unidentified flying objects sighted in 1946, mostly in Sweden and nearby Scandinavian countries, including Finland.

The first reports of ghost rockets were made on February 26, 1946, by Finnish observers. About 2,000 sightings were logged between May and December 1946, with peaks on 9 and 11 August 1946. Two hundred sightings were verified with radar returns, and authorities recovered physical fragments which were attributed to ghost rockets.

Investigations concluded that many ghost rocket sightings were probably caused by meteors. For example, the peaks of the sightings, on 9 and 11 August 1946, also fall within the peak of the annual Perseid meteor shower. However, most ghost rocket sightings did not occur during meteor shower activity, and furthermore displayed characteristics inconsistent with meteors, such as reported maneuverability.

Debate continues as to the origins of the unidentified ghost rockets. In 1946, however, it was thought likely that they originated from the former German rocket facility at Peenemünde, and were long-range tests by the Soviets of captured German V-1 or V-2 missiles, or perhaps another early form of cruise missile because of the ways they were sometimes seen to maneuver. This prompted the Swedish Army to issue a directive stating that newspapers were not to report the exact location of ghost rocket sightings or any information regarding the direction or speed of the object. This information, they reasoned, was vital for evaluation purposes to the nation or nations assumed to be performing the tests.

=== Flying discs ===
Similar sentiments regarding German technology resurfaced during the 1947 flying disc craze after Kenneth Arnold's widely reported close encounter with nine crescent-shaped objects moving at a high velocity. Personnel of Project Sign, the first U.S. Air Force UFO investigation group, noted that the advanced flying wing aeronautical designs of the German Horten brothers were similar to some UFO reports. In 1959, Captain Edward J. Ruppelt, the first head of Project Blue Book (Project Sign's follow-up investigation) wrote:

When WWII ended, the Germans had several radical types of aircraft and guided missiles under development. The majority were in the most preliminary stages, but they were the only known craft that could even approach the performance of objects reported by UFO observers.

While these early speculations and reports were limited primarily to military personnel, the earliest assertion of German flying saucers in the mass media appears to have been an article that appeared in the Italian newspaper Il Giornale d'Italia in early 1950. Written by Professor Giuseppe Belluzzo, an Italian scientist and a former Italian Minister of National Economy under the Mussolini regime, it claimed that "types of flying discs were designed and studied in Germany and Italy as early as 1942". Belluzzo also expressed the opinion that "some great power is launching discs to study them".

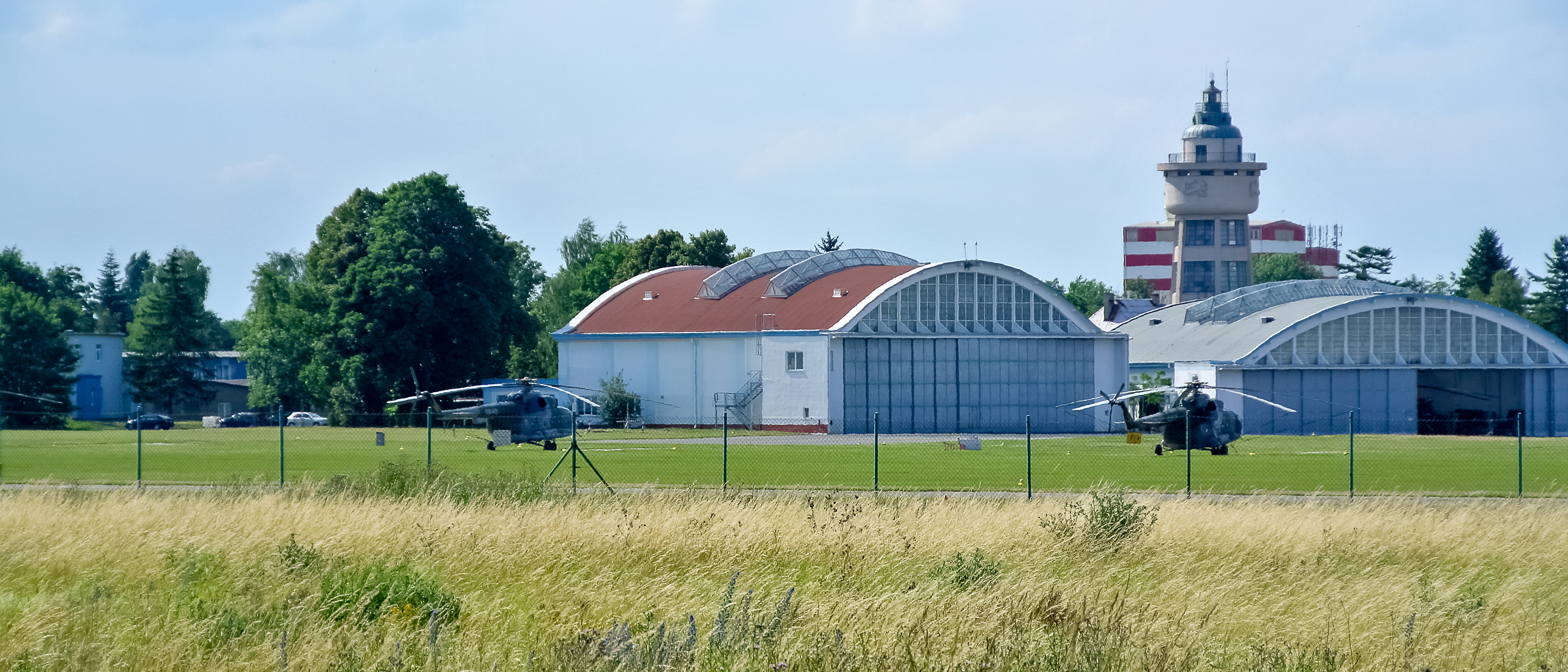
The alleged hangar at Kbely where the BMW Flugelrad was stored under occupation

During the same month, German technician Rudolf Schriever (1909–1953) gave an interview to German news magazine Der Spiegel in which he claimed that he had designed a craft powered by a circular plane of rotating turbine blades 49 ft (15 m) in diameter. He said that the project had been developed by him and his team at BMW's Prague works until April 1945, when he fled to Czechoslovakia. His designs for the disk and a model were stolen from his workshop in Bremerhaven-Lehe in 1948 and he was convinced that Czech agents had built his craft for "a foreign power". In a separate interview with Der Spiegel in October 1952, he said that the plans were stolen from a farm he was hiding in near Regen on 14 May 1945. There are other discrepancies between the two interviews that add to the confusion.

In 1953, when Avro Canada announced that it was developing the VZ-9-AV Avrocar, a circular jet aircraft with an estimated speed of 300 mph (480 km/h), German engineer Georg Klein claimed that such designs had been developed during the Nazi era. Klein identified two types of supposed German flying disks:

- A non-rotating disk developed at Breslau by V-2 rocket engineer Richard Miethe, which was captured by the Soviets, while Miethe fled to the US via France, and ended up working for Avro.
- A disk developed by Rudolf Schriever and Klaus Habermohl in Prague, which consisted of a ring of moving turbine blades around a fixed cockpit. Klein claimed that he had witnessed this craft's first crewed flight on 14 February 1945, when it managed to climb to 12,400 m (40,700 ft) in 3 minutes and attained a speed of 2,200 km/h (1,400 mph) in level flight.

Miethe claimed he had worked on the V-2 program but no corroborating evidence exists. Georg Klein claimed the engineer had escaped capture by the Soviets in Breslau by flying out in a Messerschmitt Me 163 Komet, which would have been impossible. There is no evidence that Habermohl even existed. Rudolf Schriever claimed he had worked for Heinkel as a test pilot and engineer between 1940 and 1941, but this has never been corroborated. In post-war Germany, Schriever drove supply trucks for the US Army but told newspaper reporters that delegates from foreign powers were constantly making him offers regarding his wartime projects.

Aeronautical engineer Roy Fedden remarked that the only craft that could approach the capabilities attributed to flying saucers were those being designed by the Germans towards the end of the war. Fedden (who was also chief of the technical mission to Germany for the Ministry of Aircraft Production) stated in 1945:

I have seen enough of their designs and production plans to realize that if they (the Germans) had managed to prolong the war some months longer, we would have been confronted with a set of entirely new and deadly developments in air warfare.

Fedden also added that the Germans were working on several very unusual aeronautical projects, though he did not elaborate upon his statement.

== Nazi UFO conspiracy theories ==
By the 1960s, fringe authors began spreading tales of Nazi UFOs that were tied to the occult or aliens.

According to these theories and fictional stories, various potential code-names or sub-classifications of Nazi UFO craft such as Rundflugzeug, Feuerball, Diskus, Haunebu, Hauneburg-Gerät, Glocke, V7, Vril, Kugelblitz (not related to the self-propelled anti-aircraft gun of the same name), Andromeda-Gerät, Flugkreisel, Kugelwaffe, Jenseitsflugmaschine, and Reichsflugscheibe have all been referenced. Model kit companies like Airfix and Revell have released kits of the "Haunebu", and it is featured in video games like X-Plane 11 and Warplanes: WW2 Dogfight. Accounts appeared as early as 1950, likely inspired by historical German development of specialized engines such as Viktor Schauberger's "Repulsine" around the time of World War II. Elements of these claims have been incorporated into various works of fictional and purportedly non-fictional media, including video games and documentaries, often mixed in with more substantiated information.

German UFO literature very often conforms largely to documented history on the following points:

- Nazi Germany claimed the territory of New Swabia in Antarctica, sent an expedition there in 1938, and planned others.
- Nazi Germany conducted research into advanced propulsion technology, including rocketry, Viktor Schauberger's engine research, Horten flying wing craft, and the Arthur Sack A.S.6 experimental circular winged aircraft.

=== The Morning of the Magicians ===
Le Matin des Magiciens ("The Morning of the Magicians"), a 1960 book by Louis Pauwels and Jacques Bergier, made many spectacular claims about the Vril Society of Berlin. Several years later, writers, including Jan van Helsing, Norbert-Jürgen Ratthofer, and Vladimir Terziski, have built on their work, connecting the Vril Society with UFOs. Among their claims, they imply that the society may have made contact with an alien race and dedicated itself to creating spacecraft to reach the aliens. In partnership with the Thule Society and the Nazi Party, the Vril Society developed a series of flying disc prototypes. With the Nazi defeat, the society allegedly retreated to a base in Antarctica and vanished into the Hollow Earth to meet up with the leaders of an advanced race inhabiting inner Earth.

=== The works of Ernst Zündel ===
When Ernst Zündel, a German Holocaust denier, started Samisdat Publishers in the 1970s, he initially catered to the UFOlogy community, which was then at its peak of public acceptance. His books claimed that flying saucers were Nazi secret weapons launched from an underground base in Antarctica, from which the Nazis hoped to conquer the Earth and possibly the planets. Zündel also sold (for $9999) seats on an exploration team to locate the polar entrance to the hollow earth. Some who interviewed Zündel claim that he privately admitted it was a deliberate hoax to build publicity for Samisdat, although he still defended it as late as 2002.

=== Miguel Serrano's book ===
In 1978, Miguel Serrano, a Chilean diplomat and Nazi sympathizer, published El Cordón Dorado: Hitlerismo Esotérico [The Golden Thread: Esoteric Hitlerism] (in Spanish), in which he claimed that Adolf Hitler was an Avatar of Vishnu and was, at that time, communing with Hyperborean gods in an underground Antarctic base in New Swabia. Serrano predicted that Hitler would lead a fleet of UFOs from the base to establish the Fourth Reich. In popular culture, this alleged UFO fleet is referred to as “The Final Battalion”.

=== Die Glocke ===
Die Glocke ("The Bell") was a purported top-secret Nazi scientific technological device, secret weapon, or Wunderwaffe. First described by Polish journalist and author Igor Witkowski (born 1963) in Prawda o Wunderwaffe (2000), it was later popularized by military journalist and author Nick Cook, who associated it with Nazi occultism, antigravity, and free energy suppression research. Mainstream reviewers have criticized claims about Die Glocke as being fictional, recycled rumors, and a hoax. Die Glocke and other alleged Nazi "miracle weapons" have been dramatized in video games, television shows, and novels. However, many skeptics have doubted that such a Bell UFO was actually designed or ever built.

== In popular culture ==
- In 1947, Robert A. Heinlein published Rocket Ship Galileo, a science fiction novel featuring a Nazi Moon base.
- In 1955, Angoisse pour OSS 117, part of the OSS 117 series (a series of French pulp spy novels by Jean Bruce) featured an ex-Nazi-scientist who claimed to have helped the Nazis create UFOs.
- A UFO can be found in the mission "On Track" in the 2002 video game Medal of Honor: Frontline. At the end of the level as players exit the train station, looking up immediately reveals a Nazi UFO overhead.
- In 2012, the movie Iron Sky features a Nazi base on the moon surviving until modern times and launching an assault on Earth via a fleet of flying saucers.
- In 2018, Revell released a scale model kit of a Nazi flying saucer called "Haunebu II", with an accompanying description written as if the kit was depicting a historical craft. After criticism on the grounds of historical inaccuracy, Revell issued an apology and removed the model from production and distribution.
- In the 2017 first person shooter Wolfenstein II: The New Colossus, craft named "Haunebu-V" are manufactured in Nazi-controlled Roswell, New Mexico.
- The 2017 Commando Comic Flight of Fancy featured an example of the Schriever Flugkreisel.
- In 2023, the second season finale of 30 Coins mentions the Haunebu UFOs as being copies of Nazca UFOs.
