= Smartest Guy In The Room =

- Genre: Popular science; Competition; Entertainment
- Starring: Guy Messenger; Randy Rice; Terry Myers
- Country of origin: United States
- Original language: English
- No. of seasons: 1
- No. of episodes: 12

Production
- Executive producer: Lauren Lexton
- Production location: United States
- Running time: 22 minutes
- Production company: Authentic Entertainment

Original release
- Network: History Channel
- Release: January 1 – February 16, 2016

Smartest Guy In The Room is an entertainment documentary series that tests the problem solving capabilities of three individuals: Guy Messenger, Randy Rice and Terry Myers. These people are termed as having blue collar jobs but being geniuses with an IQ higher than 140. The tasks presented in the program tests the basic skills of physics, chemistry, mathematics and mechanics. Produced by Authentic Entertainment and telecast on the History Channel, the first season consisted of 12 episodes aired between January 1 and February 14, 2016.

== Format ==
Each episode consists of two mentally challenging tasks that require planning and perseverance. In each task, one of the three men present a challenging assignment to the other two, which has to be completed within a stipulated time. Winning a challenge presents a player with one point, failing which the point goes to the person who presented the task.

== Episodes ==
No.	Title	Original release date
1	"How to not Crack an Egg"	January 1, 2016
2	"How to Win by Finishing Last"	January 1, 2016
3	"How to Have the Last Word"	January 8, 2016
4	"How to Face the Music"	January 8, 2016
5	"How to Know When to Fold 'Em"	January 15, 2016
6	"How to Float Your Boat"	January 15, 2016
7	"How to be a Ballbuster"	January 29, 2016
8	"How to Stack the Deck"	January 29, 2016
9	"How to Chute the Breeze"	February 5, 2016
10	"How to miss a hole in one"	February 5, 2016
11	"How to launch a rocket"	February 16, 2016
12	"How to get on the fast track"	February 16, 2016

== See also ==
- Street Genius
- List of programs broadcast by History (TV channel)
