= Casey Arms =

American historic weapons manufacturer

Casey Arms is a Romance, Arkansas business that makes a variety of historic weapons for "highly discerning collectors and enthusiasts", using "raw steel and ancient timber". The Casey family, led by Daniel Casey, and the Casey Arms business are the subjects of Iron & Fire, a reality television series on The History Channel. Daniel Casey is also featured on an episode of CarbonTV's original web-series Heartlandia, as he forges a traditional knife and goes hog hunting in the foothills of the Arkansas Ozarks. The close-knit, small-town company prides themselves on "quality, custom craftsmanship". Each piece can take up to 500 hours to build, and "are highly coveted by collectors and gun enthusiasts from across the United States and overseas".

== Bios ==
=== Daniel Casey ===
"Born and raised in the foothills of the Ozarks, Daniel Casey grew up obsessed with becoming a blacksmith. He built his first forge and began making knives at the age of 12." At age 14, "Daniel was determined to learn from the best and honed his craft with legendary blacksmith Hershel House."

Today, Daniel has made a full-time job of transforming scrap metal and a chunk of wood into handcrafted knives, swords and guns from any time period, but "his honey hole lands between 1770 and 1830."

Daniel's dedication to his craft and his unrivaled perfectionism make his creations among the most sought after by collectors around the world. Daniel lives on top of a mountain in Romance, Arkansas, with his wife Chelsey, his four-year-old son Wesley, and a variety of hound dogs, cats and chickens.

=== Charlie Casey ===
At the age of 23, Charlie Casey said goodbye to his family and left Arkansas to travel the U.S. and seek his fortune vowing never to become beholden to “the man.” His journey took him around the country, from Bremerton, Washington, to Blasdell, New York, to Arlington, Texas. During this time, he worked various jobs, including a vacuum cleaner salesman, a customer service representative and a machinist.

Charlie's restless spirit would not allow him to stay in one place for more than six months at a time. After five years of adventurous wanderings, he finally returned home. Today, Charlie works with his older brother Daniel and is learning the blacksmithing trade. In his continuing effort to avoid “the man,” Charlie tries to go fishing at least once a day.

=== Jonathan Kulik ===
Jonathan joined the U.S. Army at the age of 18 and served in the 82nd Airborne Division as a paratrooper. After receiving his honorable discharge, Jonathan returned to Arkansas to pursue his lifelong dream: working with his uncle Daniel at the blacksmith shop. While Jonathan is interested in all elements of the craft, he is particularly fond of woodworking and takes great pride in shaping the rifle stocks and knife handles for Daniel's creations.

Jonathan also creates flutes, penny whistles and other instruments by hand. He and his wife Emily have one daughter.
