= The States (TV series) =

- Presented by: Edward Herrmann
- Country of origin: United States
- No. of episodes: 10

Production
- Executive producers: Nicholas Stein; Robert Hughes
- Running time: 60 minutes (42 without commercials)

Original release
- Network: History Channel
- Release: April 21 – June 23, 2007

The States is a 2007 American documentary television series about the history of each state in the United States of America, narrated by Edward Herrmann.

The show documents each of the 50 states in the union. The show begins with an introduction to the five states to be documented within the episode. Each state's segment begins with the narrator giving a clue as to what that state might be, and then revealing the answer. ( e.g. "There is a North Dakota and a South Dakota, a North Carolina and a South Carolina, but there's been one "West" anything! Welcome to West Virginia.") There is then a billboard that pops up showing the state nickname, motto, population, population ranking within the union, date the state entered the union, and state flag. During interviews with historians or notable people from a state, the state's quarter is shown. Since the series was produced in 2007, Oklahoma, New Mexico, Arizona, Alaska, and Hawaii are shown with their flags. Those quarters were released in 2008

The show then highlights the history of the state itself, including notable events that have happened there, and highlights other noteworthy things in that state. In 2010 a sister presentation and then series, How the States Got Their Shapes was aired.

== Episodes ==
No.	Title	Original release date
1	"California, North Carolina, Kansas, New Hampshire, West Virginia"	April 21, 2007
2	"Texas, Massachusetts, Arkansas, Iowa, Delaware"	April 28, 2007
3	"New York, Louisiana, Oregon, New Mexico, Vermont"	May 5, 2007
4	"New Jersey, Arizona, Kentucky, Oklahoma, Alaska"	May 12, 2007
5	"Pennsylvania, Minnesota, Hawaii, South Carolina, Montana"	May 19, 2007
6	"Florida, Indiana, Washington, Utah, Rhode Island"	May 26, 2007
7	"Illinois, Connecticut, Nevada, Mississippi, Wyoming"	June 2, 2007
8	"Virginia, Ohio, Idaho, Alabama, North Dakota"	June 9, 2007
9	"Michigan, Tennessee, Maine, Missouri, South Dakota"	June 16, 2007
10	"Georgia, Colorado, Wisconsin, Nebraska, Maryland/DC"	June 23, 2007

== See also ==
- List of programs broadcast by History (TV channel)
- History Channel
