= UFO Hunters =

American television series

- Genre: Pseudoscience; Ufology; Conspiracy theory
- Directed by: Jon Alon Walz
- Starring: William J. Birnes; Pat Uskert; Ted Acworth (season 1 & 2); Jeff Tomlinson (season 1); Kevin Cook (season 3); John Tindall: experiments producer (season 1 & 2)
- Narrated by: James Lurie (season 1 & 2)
- Country of origin: United States
- Original language: English
- No. of seasons: 3
- No. of episodes: 39

Production
- Executive producer: Jon Alon Walz
- Editor: Jeff Tober
- Camera setup: Multiple
- Running time: 42 minutes
- Production companies: Motion Picture Production, Inc.

Original release
- Network: History
- Release: January 30, 2008 – October 29, 2009

UFO Hunters is an American television series that premiered on January 30, 2008, on The History Channel, produced by Motion Picture Production Inc., and ran for three seasons. Jon Alon Walz was the executive producer of the show and was responsible for selling the series to History Channel after a bidding war for the rights to the show broke out between History Channel and Sci-Fi Channel.

Prior to selling UFO Hunters to History Channel, Walz and Motion Picture Production Inc., created and executive produced several hit UFO and paranormal specials for History, including "Russian Roswell", "Deep Sea UFOs", and "The Pacific's Bermuda Triangle". William J. Birnes was the star and co-creator of the UFO Hunters series.

The concept for the show was tested in a segment of History Channel's 2006 UFO special entitled "Deep Sea UFOs", produced by Motion Picture Production Inc, which featured two of the final four cast members. UFO Hunters was not a direct spin-off from a 2005 History Channel special with the same title, but they did use images from the 2005 special to promote the premiere of the new series. The tagline of the show is: "Hoax or History?" The series should not be confused with a similarly themed and titled UFO Hunters, a special that debuted the same day and time on the Sci-Fi Channel, (now SyFy), and created by the producers of Ghost Hunters, but which only aired one episode.

The series was one of the first fully HD-produced, 16x9 format, reality series on cable. In the US, History Channel only released the first two seasons on DVD in the correct airdate order. However, the format was only released in full screen (1:33:1) instead of wide screen. In the UK, History Channel released the third and final season on DVD, but the episodes were released in the incorrect airdate order. In a 2011 interview with podcaster Jim Harold, William J. Birnes claimed that after the Dulce Base episode aired, the show was canceled by top level executives at History Channel.

== Format ==
The show follows numerous investigations (referred to as "cases" in the beginning of each episode) led by William J. Birnes and his team of experts: researcher and scuba diver Pat Uskert, mechanical engineer and MIT researcher Ted Acworth, and investigative biologist Jeff Tomlinson. In the second season, Tomlinson departed. In the third season, Acworth was replaced by mechanical engineer Kevin Cook.

In each episode, the team investigates reports of unidentified aerial phenomena, including interviewing witnesses of close encounters with UFOs, USOs (unidentified submerged objects), and supposed extraterrestrial life. They also analyze any evidence collected such as photographs, video, or recovered physical material. They also conduct research with other investigators and scientists in the field in an attempt to find conclusive evidence that a report is real or a hoax. The show includes investigations of long-standing UFO cases, such as the Roswell, New Mexico UFO crash incident and other famous sightings throughout history.

The opening theme song "The Only One" was performed by the band Operator. In later seasons the song was removed and the opening theme was changed.

== Series overview ==
Season	Episodes	Originally released	
Season	Episodes	First released	Last released
1	13	January 30, 2008	May 7, 2008
2	13	October 29, 2008	February 25, 2009
3	13	March 18, 2009	October 29, 2009

== Episodes ==
=== Season 1 (2008) ===
Season 1 aired from January 30, 2008, to May 7, 2008.

No. overall	No. in season	Title	Original release date
1	1	"The UFO Before Roswell"	January 30, 2008
The hunters take a look at a little-known UFO encounter off Maury Island, Washington which happened two weeks before the famous Roswell, New Mexico crash.
2	2	"USOs"	February 6, 2008
The team checks out the reports of unidentified submerged objects (USOs), one of which reportedly caused the crash of a single-engine aircraft, off the coast of Santa Catalina Island, California.
3	3	"Abductions"	February 13, 2008
The team looks back into the famous Betty and Barney Hill alien abduction case in Lincoln, New Hampshire and later observes the surgical removal of a supposed alien implant from a man's leg.
4	4	"Crash and Retrieval"	February 20, 2008
The team looks into the 1974 Coyame and 2007 Xilitla UFO crash cases in Mexico, where the Mexican and U.S. military reportedly recovered wreckage material.
5	5	"Military vs. UFOs"	February 27, 2008
The team reopens the files on the famous 1956 RAF Bentwaters and 1980 Rendlesham Forest UFO incidents, and the supposed cover ups that followed.
6	6	"Cops vs. UFOs"	March 5, 2008
The hunters look at police reports from Florida and the United Kingdom that involve patrolmen encounters with UFOs.
7	7	"Reverse Engineering"	March 12, 2008
The team looks into lingering rumors that advanced military aircraft, such as the SR-71 Blackbird and B-2 Spirit Bomber, were designed from reverse engineered alien technology and examines the "CARET" Drone Incident.
8	8	"Vortexes"	March 19, 2008
The team looks into New York's Hudson Valley; Sedona, Arizona; and Britain's Stonehenge, to determine what makes them purported UFO hotspots.
9	9	"Alien Contact"	April 2, 2008
The team compares the strange encounters of two men, one from Cleveland, Ohio and the other from Suffolk, Virginia, to see if there is evidence that they've had contact with extraterrestrials.
10	10	"Invasion: Texas 2008"	April 9, 2008
The team investigates the January 2008 mass UFO sightings between Fort Worth, Texas and Houston, with special focus on the nearby town of Stephenville, Texas.
11	11	"UFO Dogfights"	April 16, 2008
Investigation into an Iranian and a Peruvian fighter pilot's claims of combat engagements with UFOs.
12	12	"Code Red"	April 30, 2008
The team interviews military air traffic controllers who have come forward about tracking UFOs over restricted airspace and the security alerts that followed.
13	13	"The NASA Files"	May 7, 2008
The team interviews former NASA astronauts, engineers, and scientists and delves into video footage to see if the space agency knows more about UFOs than it is letting on.

=== Season 2 (2008–09) ===
Season 2 aired from October 29, 2008, to February 25, 2009.

No. overall	No. in season	Title	Original release date
14	1	"Invasion Illinois"	October 29, 2008
The team reviews a 2004 Tinley Park, Illinois UFO mass-sighting event where some eyewitnesses claim seeing three separate objects, while others believe it was a single triangular craft over 1500 feet wide.
15	2	"UFO Emergency"	November 5, 2008
The hunters reopen famous police cold-cases involving mass UFO sightings such as the 1994 Trumbull County, Ohio and Holland, Michigan sightings and the 2000 Millstadt, Illinois case where 911 dispatchers were flooded with calls and police radio chatter of strange lights moving slowly through the sky.
16	3	"Heartland Explosion"	November 12, 2008
The team investigates an April 16, 2008 Kokomo, Indiana report of a high decibel boom that echoed across the heartland and was supposedly followed by sightings of a fiery object in the night sky.
17	4	"Aurora First Contact"	November 19, 2008
The team researches the story of the 1897 Aurora, Texas UFO crash where the townsfolk are rumored to have tossed the ship wreckage down a well and buried the body of the non-human pilot in their local cemetery.
18	5	"The Real Roswell"	December 3, 2008
The team looks into rumors of the crash site of a flying disk recovered by the military in Aztec, New Mexico on the same night of the famous Roswell incident.
19	6	"Arizona Lights"	December 10, 2008
The hunters join Out of the Blue filmmaker James Fox on an investigation of an April 21, 2008 mass-sighting report of a triangular craft spotted over the Nevada/Arizona border to as far as Tucson and looks at connections to the "Phoenix Lights" incident of 1997.
20	7	"Lost UFO Files"	December 31, 2008
The team delves into the University of Arizona archives to review the notes of late UFO investigator James E. McDonald and brings to light his research and evidence that has lain dormant since his death in 1971.
21	8	"Alien Fallout"	January 14, 2009
The investigators take a look at close encounters of the second kind, such as the December 29, 1980 case of Betty Cash, and Vickie and Colby Landrum, who claimed they encountered a fiery object hovering over a road that emitted intense heat and allegedly left them suffering symptoms of radiation exposure.
22	9	"UFO Storm"	January 28, 2009
The team joins UFO researcher Nick Pope and investigates a recent wave of UFO hysteria in the United Kingdom which started soon after the Ministry of Defence released formerly classified documents in May 2008.
23	10	"Giant UFOs"	February 4, 2009
The team probes the skies over England following an airline pilot's official report of a pair of UFOs he believed to be at least a mile in length, and a review of other sightings of gigantic unidentified craft seen over the United States.
24	11	"Aliens at the Airport"	February 11, 2009
The hunters investigate the growing number of encounters between commercial aircraft and UFOs, highlighting a November 2006 incident at O'Hare International Airport in Chicago and a 2004 sighting in Osaka, Japan.
25	12	"Alien Crashes"	February 18, 2009
The hunters try to find what the military covered up in a recent May 2008 crash of an unknown object in Needles, California, and looks at other famous crash incidents like the Kecksburg, Pennsylvania case where the military supposedly undertook a massive clean up effort and intimidated local witnesses.
26	13	"Area 51 Revealed"	February 25, 2009
The team finds new vantage points to spy on the recent activity at Area 51, which in the past decade has acquired more public lands to increase perimeter security, and built new towers, buildings and runways for the continued development of top secret aircraft.

=== Season 3 (2009) ===
History ended Season 3 of the series abruptly on May 20, 2009, and the last four episodes that were produced were never broadcast. According to his Facebook page, Bill Birnes headed up an online petition for History to continue the series. On October 29, 2009, History aired the last four episodes as a four-hour marathon.

No. overall	No. in season	Title	Original release date
27	1	"Giant Triangles"	March 18, 2009
The team investigates the increasing number of enormous black triangle reports in Sonora, California – what has become known as "Triangle Alley" – and analyzes night and rare daylight video footage of these objects to determine if they are top secret military aircraft or otherworldly spacecraft.
28	2	"Underground Alien Bases"	March 25, 2009
The team looks into the claims of undercover investigators and former military personnel about the Dulce Base, an alleged alien facility that exists somewhere below a mesa near Española, New Mexico, where human-alien hybrid experiments are being performed and how the beings there came into deadly conflict with military personnel.
29	3	"The Greys Conspiracy"	April 1, 2009
The team investigates alien abduction cases from different parts of the world, each with alarmingly similar details involving alien-human hybrid experimentation and beings ufologists call "Greys" which are typically described as gray-skinned humanoids with large, black, almond-shaped eyes.
30	4	"Underwater Alien Bases"	April 8, 2009
The hunters delve into the mountain of reports from the Gulf Breeze, Florida UFO sighting wave of the early 1990s and then looks for possible connections to recent reports from Guantánamo Bay, Cuba of alleged Unidentified Submerged Objects (USOs) spotted rising from the ocean.
31	5	"Nazi UFOs"	April 22, 2009
The team ventures to Germany and Poland to investigate rumors that the Third Reich had reverse engineered alien technology and may have produced a functional spacecraft, and how some of this technology was captured by the United States and helped jump start the U.S. space program. Military historian Igor Witkowski gives the team insight on Die Glocke ("The Bell"), an alleged top secret Nazi Wunderwaffe.
32	6	"Alien Harvest"	April 29, 2009
The team investigates the phenomena of cattle mutilations, investigating a recent slaughter in Norwood, Missouri and following patterns of other cases, as well as sightings of black helicopters in Trinidad, Colorado which have led some to believe the military may be involved in the killings as part of a secret experiment.
33	7	"UFO Relics"	May 6, 2009
Investigating so-called "trace cases", the team studies supposed physical evidence left behind after various UFO sightings, from a strange glass-like rock found in Poland, to an odd piece of metal a Missouri man claims to have found after it was dropped from a UFO.
34	8	"Underwater Area 51"	May 13, 2009
The investigators monitor the activity of the AUTEC (Atlantic Undersea Test and Evaluation Center), which is used by the U.S. Navy for underwater research, but the increasing reports of UFO and USO activity surrounding the facility have led to rumors the base is testing alien technology.
35	9	"UFO Surveillance"	May 20, 2009
The team analyzes videos and eyewitness accounts that suggest a strong UFO presence at two of America's top research facilities; Brookhaven National Laboratory on New York's Long Island, and Lawrence Livermore Laboratory in Northern California.
36	10	"Dark Presence"	October 29, 2009
The team investigates the phenomena of orbs and travel to areas of orb activity in Arizona, Indiana, and Missouri where some witnesses claim the spheres are intelligent and communicate through dreams and premonitions.
37	11	"First Response"	October 29, 2009
The team tries to gather insight on the military's "First Response" protocols, the alleged recovery and cover-up procedures that are followed in case of a UFO incident. The investigation takes them to a claim of a military pursuit of multiple UFOs near Long Beach, California and a return visit to the supposed UFO crash in Needles, California in 2008.
38	12	"The Silencers"	October 29, 2009
The hunters delve into cases involving witness interrogation by mysterious agents known as the "Men in Black" (MIBs), who sometimes appear suddenly after a UFO event, exhibit unusual behavior, know facts that have not been divulged by witnesses, and threaten the lives of those involved with severe consequences unless they remain silent about their encounter.
39	13	"Area 52"	October 29, 2009
The hunters investigate the Dugway Proving Ground, a remote military testing facility near Dugway, Utah, and examine the reports of UFO activity that has surrounded the site for the past 10 years – leading some UFO watchers to dub it "Area 52" and "The New Area 51."

== See also ==
- List of topics characterized as pseudoscience
- Ancient Aliens
- UFO Files
- Hangar 1: The UFO Files
- Unidentified flying object (UFO)
