= Nick Cook (writer) =

British writer

Nicholas Julian Cook is a British aviation journalist turned defence consultant, former CEO of the defence industry consultancy Dynamixx, and author, whose interest in consciousness studies led him to become a director at Robert Bigelow's Institute for Consciousness Studies.

== Journalism ==
In the 1990s, Cook was the aviation editor of Jane's Defence Weekly, the international defence journal. He was an aerospace consultant and contributor to the journal from 2002 to 2008.

He won four Journalism Awards from the Royal Aeronautical Society in the Defence, Business, Technology, and Propulsion categories.

== Books ==
The Hunt For Zero Point, published by Century Random House in the UK in 2001 and Broadway Books in the US in 2002, details Cook's ten-year investigation into anti-gravity technology. It focuses on Igor Witkowski's conspiracy theory that the Nazis developed a UFO-like device which allegedly became the basis for US research.

Cook has also written two novels, Angel Archangel and Aggressor, as well as ghostwriting a number of books predominantly on military subjects.

== Television ==
The 1999 Discovery Channel documentary Billion Dollar Secret followed Cook's investigation into secret US military spending and experimental aircraft that may have been mistaken for UFOs. He also wrote and presented the 2005 documentary UFO's: The Secret Evidence, known as An Alien History of Planet Earth in the US.

== Other media appearances ==
He has been a frequent guest on Coast To Coast AM, a radio show that deals with the paranormal and conspiracy theories.

== Other work ==
Cook was the founder and CEO of Dynamixx, a consultancy that brought together the defence industry and the search for solutions to climate change. His current focus is on writing and corporate storytelling.

== Consciousness and afterlife research ==
In 2014, Cook's wife Ali experienced what she described as a shared-death experience during her mother's death. She told Cook, “I was there. I knew the meaning of life and the secret of the universe but I couldn't bring it back with me.” The experience prompted Cook to begin researching consciousness, eventually inspiring his novel The Grid.

Some years later, Cook was contacted by an anonymous philanthropist—unfamiliar to him but a reader of The Hunt for Zero Point—who offered to fund two years of Cook's research into consciousness, with no conditions attached.

In late 2020, American businessman Robert Bigelow launched an essay competition on the topic: "What is the best available evidence for the survival of consciousness after permanent bodily death?" Cook submitted an entry, which was awarded a $20,000 prize. Following this, Bigelow invited him to become director at the Bigelow Institute for Consciousness Studies.
