= Boulder Outdoor Survival School =

Outdoor education organization in Utah, United States

Coordinates: 37°54′32″N 111°25′25″W

The Boulder Outdoor Survival School (BOSS) is a wilderness skills and survival school that has been teaching courses in southern Utah since 1968. BOSS has been based in the small town of Boulder, Utah since 1977. BOSS courses are known for being extremely challenging and for traveling through some of the most remote wilderness in the United States.

== History ==
In 1968, a Brigham Young University professor named Larry Dean Olsen, author of Outdoor Survival Skills, founded a program to take failing college students into the wilderness for 30 days. He traveled with them through challenges in the deep wilderness of southern Utah to give them the opportunity to build resilience, mental toughness, and adaptability. The initial course was a huge success, and students returned to BYU transformed. The BYU Survival Course (also called Youth Leadership 480) was born.

For the next 10 years, under the leadership of a determined group of instructors (Larry Mullins, Doug Nelson, Dave Wescott, and others), Youth Leadership 480 continued to take BYU students into the wilderness of Southern Utah to give them the chance to learn primitive skills and meet the challenges of the wilderness. When Larry Mullins was injured in 1973, Doug Nelson took over management of the program. Under Doug’s leadership the program flourished and grew. Doug streamlined and built the program in the university context, then in 1977 took it out from under the umbrella of BYU and incorporated it as an independent business in the small town of Boulder, Utah.

Doug continued to run BOSS until 1985, when his friend (and another of Larry’s instructors) David Wescott took the reins as owner. Dave and his wife Paula grew the program to include teaching the traditional skills of the Ancestral Puebloans and Fremont culture, adding more depth and a strong skills-focus to the program. He hired instructors who appreciated the history and legacy of indigenous people and who could teach the skills of so-called “primitive” cultures to modern outdoor enthusiasts. In the late 80s, BOSS began expanding beyond Utah, offering courses in Mexico. In 1988, David and other BOSS staff founded the Rabbitstick gathering in Idaho.

By 1990, in addition to its world-famous Field courses, BOSS was offering Skills courses intensively focusing on the practice of traditional skills. With topics ranging from ethnobotany to primitive pottery to stone tools, students had the opportunity to explore the world of these skills and the connection to human history they provide in greater depth, without the challenge of extreme hiking. In the 90s, BOSS also started running courses in Canada with Mors Kochanski.

In 1994, BOSS alumnus and past staff member Josh Bernstein returned to BOSS as Marketing and Administrative Director, opening a new office in Boulder, Colorado. Josh restructured the BOSS curriculum to include an even greater emphasis on traditional cultures, and eventually took over as owner in 1997.

In 2001, BOSS’s Field Office in Boulder, Utah moved from a 1/4 acre parcel of land to 41 acres on Highway 12. Jenny Stein joined BOSS as Customer Service manager, working from the Colorado office. In 2004, Jeff Sanders took over as Program Director. Under Jeff’s leadership, many systems were put in place that ensured smooth field operations, staff development, and consistent delivery of the BOSS curriculum. Under Jenny and Jeff’s supervision, the number of students, courses and staff continued to grow.

In late 2010, Steve Dessinger, Laurel Holding and Bryan Puskar - all long-time instructors of the school - were promoted to Director positions, and in 2014, Josh Bernstein passed the torch of ownership to Steve Dessinger.

In 2015, with the financial support of dedicated BOSS alumni, BOSS Instructor (now Board Member) Jessica Ewing and Laurel Holding established the first-ever BOSS Scholarship fund. Since then BOSS has been awarding grants to students demonstrating financial need and strong merit.

After running the school for four years, Steve decided, with the support of other long-time BOSS staff, to transition the school to a 501(c)(3) organization. The nonprofit organization hit the ground running, with a board of directors initially made up of BOSS staff members Perry Tancredi, Jessica Ewing, Michael Denisoff, Charlie Detar, and Steve Dessinger. The board named Eli Loomis as BOSS’s first executive director. In 2023, Sarah Brooks took over as Executive Director, and in 2024 BOSS named Jay Carson her successor.

In 2018, BOSS celebrated its 50th year of teaching tough wilderness programs and offering transformative experiences to students.

== Philosophy ==
The BOSS philosophy includes teaching skills in context, using simple, durable technology, and building mental toughness and resilience through powerful experiences in the wilderness. One of their principles is, "know more, carry less." In the field course, a BOSS staple since 1968, participants carry no tents, sleeping bags, portable stoves or backpacks, and carry little more than a knife, a poncho, and the clothes on their backs. BOSS believes in traveling light and having a positive impact on the land. Field courses last 7 days, 14 days or 28 days. They also offer specialty courses focusing intensively on primitive skills or navigation lasting 7 or 14 days.

== Lawsuit ==
In July 2006, Dave Buschow, a participant in one of BOSS' field courses died of dehydration and electrolyte imbalance. A lawsuit was filed by the participant's family in May, 2007, and was settled in November, 2007. There is a website, rememberdave.net, dedicated to Dave's memory.

== See also ==
- Outdoor education
- Outward Bound
- National Outdoor Leadership School
- Wilderness therapy
