= Quest for King Arthur =

Quest for King Arthur is a 2004 History Channel production introduced by Ioan Gruffudd and narrated by Patrick Stewart. The production delves into multiple historical figures who may have contributed to Arthurian legend as early as the third century and as late as the 9th. It cites as its primary source of the legend the writings of Sir Thomas Malory. Other writings and sources, many used by Malory, are cited for their specific contributions to the legend.
