= Boneyard Beach =

Boneyard Beach may refer to:

- Boneyard Beach (Florida), a beach on Big Talbot Island
- Boneyard Beach (South Carolina), a beach on Bulls Island
- Boneyard Beach (album), a 1995 album by American band Dish
