= Ape to Man =

Dramatised documentary on the finding the missing link in evolution

- Ape to Man - The History Channel 2005
- Genre: Nature documentary
- Directed by: Nic Young
- Narrated by: Edward Herrmann
- Composer: Ilan Eshkeri
- Country of origin: United States
- Original language: English
- No. of episodes: 1

Production
- Executive producers: Bill Locke; Marc Etkind
- Producers: Anna Thomson; Renate Samson; Tricia Chacon; Carina Wilson; Shahana Meer; Emily McDowell
- Production location: South Africa
- Running time: 90 minutes
- Production companies: Big Banana Films; Lion Television; A113 Media Group Company; AEE Television networks

Original release
- Network: History Channel
- Release: August 7, 2005

Ape to Man is a dramatised documentary on the scientific community's journey to find the missing link in human evolution, between early hominids and anatomically modern humans.

== Synopsis ==
Ape to Man: Theory of evolution is a dramatised documentary on the scientific community's attempts to find evidence of the missing link between early hominids and anatomically modern humans. This documentary follows a timeline journey of discoveries from 1856, around the time of the publication of Charles Darwin's On the Origin of Species, to 2005, analysing the impact each discovery had on the theories of human evolution.

The story starts with German schoolteacher (and former anatomy student) Johann Fuhlrott in 1856, recognising that a skull and legbone found in a cave differed enough from modern humans to possibly be a missing link. The fossilised bones were 40,000 years old, from a Neanderthal, who used stone tools for opportunist hunting, harnessed fire and lived in caves. He was stocky, muscular, had a huge brain and skull, was good to organise, communicate, plan strategy and had advanced human skills.

Then in 1889, in Java, Indonesia, in Asia, Eugène Dubois came to be in possession of a fossilised skull with a brain cavity seemingly too large to be that of an ape. He had discovered Java Man (Pithicantharus erectus), who had lived some 800,000 years ago. Duboir's find was rejected by the scientific community as was believed to be too ape-like. In 1912, a fake fossil was discovered by Charles Dawson with a large skull and ape-like jaws. At the time it fit with the scientific community's perception of the missing link's large brain with apelike characteristics, it took 40 years to uncover that Piltdown Man was a forgery.

In 1974, scientists in Ethiopia, Africa, discover a skeleton of Australopithecus afarensis (Lucy) from around 3.2 million years ago. Lucy's ancestors had existed in a forested environment for 50 million years, living mainly on fruit. Lucy developed the ability to walk on 2 legs (bipedally) across grassland to cope with naturally occurring deforestation. By standing upright, Lucy could see further than other apes as a defence against predators. Coincidentally, this adaption freed up the hands for later tool use.

In 1996, the investigation went high-tech. Matthias Krings from LMU Munich managed to extract 40,000-year-old DNA from the Neanderthal bone. DNA tests on modern humans reveal only 8 differences occur in any range of samples, in the Neanderthal DNA there were 30 differences, proving they were of an entirely different species.

Half a million years ago, Homo erectus first migrated out from Africa to Europe and Asia. They settled becoming Neanderthals in Europe. 200,000 years ago, there was a second migration from Africa, this time by Homo sapiens, the encroached upon the pre-existing species with superior weapons, better organization and more numbers and eventually forcing Neanderthals and Homo erectus to extinction.

== Cast ==
- Leslie Aiello as Self - Head of Graduate School, University College, London (as Prof. Leslie Aiello)
- Joe Cain as Self - Science & Technology Studies, University College, London (as Dr. Joe Cain)
- Kevin Hudson as Eugène Dubois
- Tessa Jubber as Dora Dart
- Chris Rogers as Svänte Paabo
- Thorsten Wedekind as Johann Fuhlrott

== Advisors and crew ==
- Johannesburg Zoo
- Dr. Frances Thackery
- Professor Phillip V. Tobias
- Dr. Terry Hopkinson
- Linvatec UK Ltd
- Editor = Crispin Holland
- Cinematography = Brian McDairmant
