= Josh Bernstein =

American explorer, survival expert, anthropologist, writer, and TV host

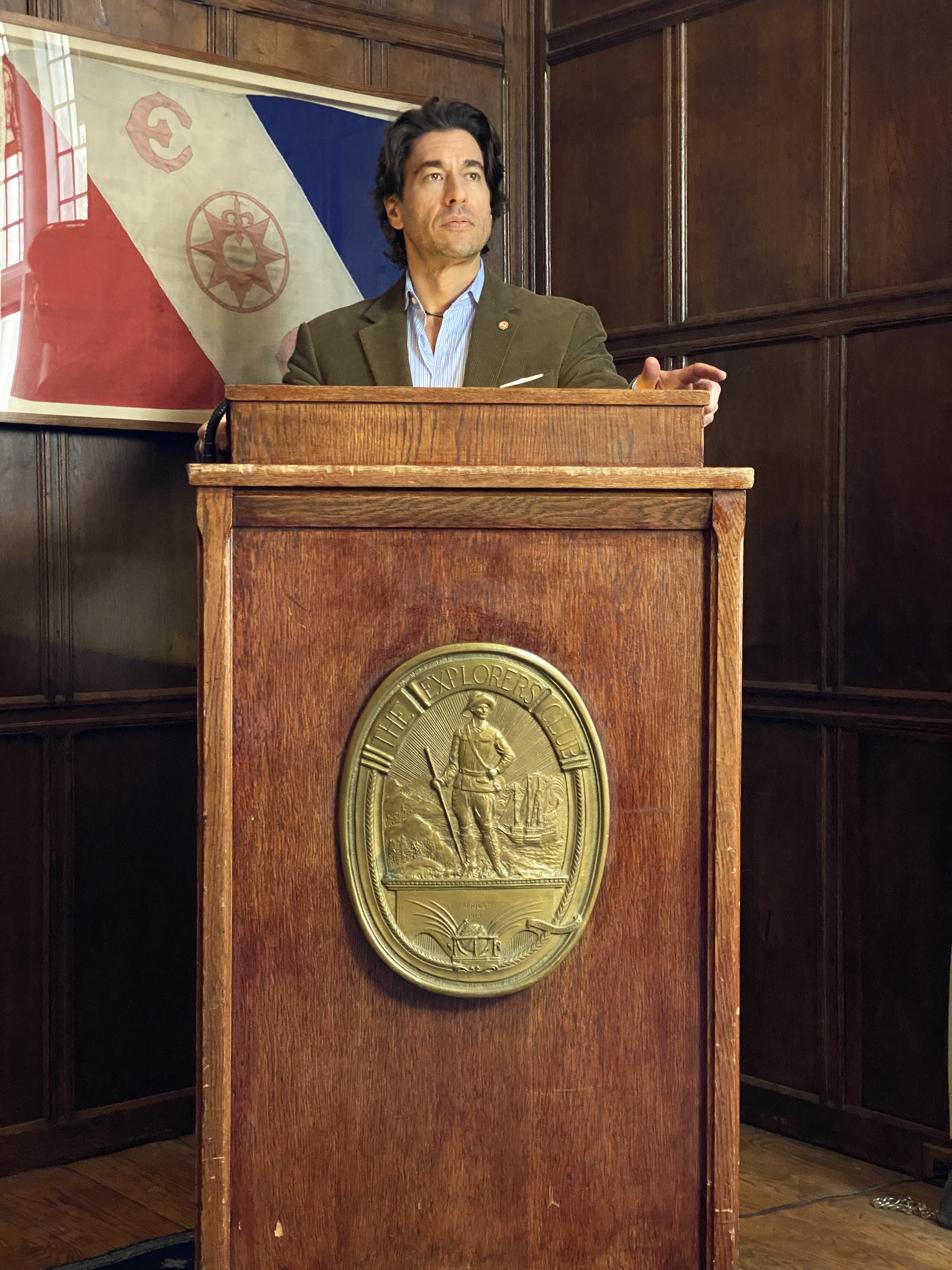
- Bernstein speaking at The Explorers Club, June 2021
- Born: February 24, 1971 (age 55); Manhattan, New York
- Education: Cornell University
- Occupations: Explorer, executive producer, television host, former wilderness survival instructor
- Website: joshbernstein.com

Josh Bernstein (born February 24, 1971) is an American explorer, writer, executive producer, survival expert, anthropologist, and TV host best known as the host of Digging for the Truth. He later appeared for one season as the host of the Discovery Channel's Into the Unknown with Josh Bernstein.

== Personal life ==
Josh Bernstein was born and raised in Manhattan, and attended the Horace Mann School. In 1989, he went to Cornell University where he double-majored in Anthropology and Psychology, and double minored in Native American and Near Eastern Studies. He served two terms as president of the Beta Theta chapter of the Pi Kappa Alpha fraternity. After graduating from college, he spent a year in a post-graduate program in Jerusalem studying, among other things, mysticism and ancient texts. He is Jewish. His father was born in Jerusalem's Old City, and his paternal grandparents and great-grandparents are buried in Israel.

Bernstein's father died of a heart attack six weeks before Bernstein's 15th birthday. A year later, his three-year-old sister was killed in an automobile accident. Bernstein has an identical twin brother, Andrew.

Bernstein is a fellow of The Explorers Club and the Royal Geographical Society. He is a traveler, SCUBA diver, and professional photographer, with published credits in Vogue magazine, USA Today, Sports Illustrated, Forbes, Men's Health, Self, Marie Claire, Men's Fitness, Outside, and Backpacker magazines.

Bernstein was briefly married to Lily Snyder of Sotheby's, Manhattan. They were married in a ceremony in Jerusalem, Israel, in September 2011 but divorced in 2013.

== Professional life ==
=== The History Channel: Digging for the Truth ===
Digging for the Truth was an adventure-archaeology series on The History Channel exploring ancient mysteries around the world. The series premiered with Bernstein as host in January 2005 and became the highest-rated series in the history of The History Channel. Season 3 premiered on January 22, 2007, again setting a record for the network with the highest-rated series/season premiere to date (over 2.1 million viewers). The April 16, 2007, episode marked Bernstein's final appearance as host of Digging for the Truth. The series continued for a 4th season without Bernstein before it was removed from primetime and then cancelled.

Digging for the Truth: One Man's Epic Adventure Exploring the World's Greatest Archaeological Mysteries is a print companion to the television series, authored by Bernstein, that reveals much more of the personal trials and challenges he faced making the series. It received critical acclaim and was released in hardcover in Winter 2006, and paperback in the Fall, 2007.

=== Boulder Outdoor Survival School ===
In addition to his former role as host of Digging for the Truth, Bernstein was the president and CEO of BOSS, the Boulder Outdoor Survival School, the oldest and largest traditional living skills/survival school in the world. Bernstein first attended BOSS as a student in 1988, when he was 17. He returned in 1989 as an apprentice, then worked his way up to instructor, marketing director and finally CEO in 1997. Bernstein sold his ownership of BOSS in January 2014, to focus on a new educational initiative.

=== Into the Unknown with Josh Bernstein ===
On February 20, 2007, Bernstein announced that he was leaving The History Channel and Digging for the Truth to join the Discovery Channel as an executive producer and host of specials as well as a new prime-time series called "Into the Unknown with Josh Bernstein." The new series premiered during the 2008 Olympics in August 2008. The show was canceled after one season. While Bernstein has not commented publicly on the matter, some speculate there was a shift in the "vision" and programming slate of the network when Discovery Channel President Jane Root was replaced by John Ford.

=== Media appearances ===
Bernstein has appeared on NBC, ABC, and CBS News programs, including Good Morning America and The Today Show. He appeared on The Daily Show with Jon Stewart on January 15, 2007. Bernstein is known for wearing many hats, mostly cowboy hats, which has led to him being likened to Indiana Jones. Although the History Channel played up the comparison in its promotion of Digging for the Truth, Bernstein frowns on this comparison, observing that he never wears a fedora (Indiana Jones' trademark hat), and his fashion sense has nothing to do with the fictional archaeologist.

He has also been featured in the premiere issue of Men's Vogue magazine, the cover of the Style section of The New York Times and featured in People magazine's Sexiest Man Alive issue.
