= ThingamaBob =

- Genre: entertainment, science
- Country of origin: United States
- Original language: English
- No. of seasons: 1
- No. of episodes: 10

Production
- Executive producers: Jenny Daly; Bill Rademaker; Andrew Geller; Sam Penfield; Arvind Palep; Serge Patzak
- Camera setup: Multiple
- Running time: 24 minutes
- Production company: TGroup Productions

Original release
- Network: H2
- Release: January 18 – February 26, 2014

ThingamaBob is science entertainment television series. The series premiered in the United States on the H2 on January 18, 2014. The show follows inventor Bob Partington around as he attempts to build various contraptions for local businesses in Brooklyn. Ten episodes have been scheduled to be produced by TGroup Productions in association with 1stAveMachine.

== Plot ==
Bob Partington is an inventor from Brooklyn, New York. In each episode, Bob receives a new box of items which are related to American history in a way. Bob is required to use these items to reinvent three unique inventions. The show follows Bob around as he comes up with ideas to use the items for and eventually constructs fully functioning contraptions. The show is accommodated with historical facts regarding the items Bob has to use.

== Episodes ==
No.	Title	Original release date
1	"Pizza Guillotine"	January 18, 2014
In this episode, Bob received a boat helm, a printer brayer, and a pair of suspenders. He ends up using the boat helm to construct a "Pizza Guillotine" which is used to slice pizza. He uses the brayer to create a beer can cooler. The suspenders are used to create a cellphone charger.
2	"Paper Airplane Catapult"	January 18, 2014
Bob makes a paper airplane catapult with coins.
3	"Chair Pants"	January 25, 2014
Bob gets a hot dog roller machine, Levi's jeans, and a pair of scales. Bob uses the hot dog roller machine to form a "Hot Dog Crossbow". He uses the Levi's jeans to create pants that can be used to sit on, dubbed the "Chair Pants".
4	"Tuba Keg"	January 25, 2014
Bob received a sousaphone (which he incorrectly mistaken for a tuba), a waffle cone, and a wall plug. He uses the tuba to create a "Tuba Keg". The waffle cone was not used directly, however he finds a local creamery where he combines two dishers together to create a double scooper. The wall plug was used as a toggle switch which he uses to control a tool shooting contraption.
5	"Beer Slider"	February 1, 2014
Bob received a telegraph key, phonograph, roll of tape.
6	"BBQ Gun"	February 1, 2014
Bob makes a gun to shoot BBQ sauce.
7	"Expanding Toolbox"	February 11, 2014
Bob helps out the fire department, an egg cracker invention.
8	"Violin Doorbell"	February 11, 2014
Bob makes a special doorbell for a store.
9	"Tent Slinger"	February 26, 2014
Bob makes a special machine to open up a tent.
10	"S'Mores Machine"	February 26, 2014
Bob makes a special s'mores machine.

== See also ==
- Rube Goldberg machine
- H2
