= Honey hole =

Slang for a location that yields a valued commodity or resource

Named after a beehive for its honey, honey hole (or honeyhole) is slang for a location that yields a valued commodity or resource. Though one may hear the word honey hole and think that it relates to an actual hole in some foreign location, more often than not there is no hole involved at all. A local landmark or road near a honey hole may have "Honey Hole" in its name or as a nickname for a muddy spot.

== Uses ==
=== Fishing ===
In fishing, a honey hole could be a particular spot in a body of water (or used as a general term for the entire body of water) where conditions are ideal for catching fish. Such a spot could be the leading edge of a hump, a depression, or a bend in the channel.

=== Hunting ===
In deer hunting, a honey hole is a place where the buck will be safe from the hunter and where the hunter rarely thinks of looking for a buck; such a place could be an "acorn tree surrounded by a briar thicket or a tree on the edge of a patch of cane near a river or creek bank".

== Popular culture ==
- American Pickers, a documentary reality television series where the stars often refer to some "picks" as honey holes because of the amount of amazing objects they contain.
