= Boneyard (TV series) =

Television series

Boneyard is an American television program on The History Channel that documents places called boneyards (as the title suggests), where old and retired vehicles, ships, aircraft, and other miscellaneous items are taken apart, and rebuilt to do other tasks or scrapped. It premiered on September 20, 2007.

== Waste disposal ==
The recycling of food oils and daily processing of millions of gallons of municipal sewage to biodiesel is a new emerging industry.
