= Chris Chesser =

Film and television producer (1948–2023)

- Born: Christopher Ian Chesser; September 16, 1948
- Died: February 2, 2023 (aged 74); Los Angeles, California, U.S.
- Occupations: Film and television producer
- Notable work: Major League

Christopher Ian Chesser (September 16, 1948 – February 2, 2023) was an American film and television producer. He was known for producing the 1989 film Major League. He died in Los Angeles on February 2, 2023, at the age of 74.
