= Command Decisions =

American television series

Command Decisions was a series produced by Hoff Productions which aired on The History Channel in 2004. Each episode depicted an historic battle through re-creations, and gave the viewer an opportunity to test his or her skills, strategies, and nerve as a commander through nine questions. The viewer was asked to imagine themselves in the mind of the battlefield commander, and would choose from three options for how to proceed.

List of depicted battles:

- Battle of the Bulge (December 1944 – January 1945) Original Airdate: July 23, 2004
- Battle of Britain (1940)
- Battle of Iwo Jima (February–March 1945) Original Airdate: December 18, 2004
- Battle of Rivoli (January 1797) Original Airdate: December 5, 2004
- San Juan Hill (July 1898) Original Airdate: November 24, 2004
- Siege of Alesia (September 52 BC)
- Tet Offensive (1968) Original Airdate: September 24, 2004
- Six Day War (June 1967) Original Airdate: October 1, 2004
- Cambrai (November–December 1917) Original Airdate: July 30, 2004
- Châlons (June 451 AD) Original Airdate: October 8, 2004
- Gettysburg (July 1863) Original Airdate: October 15, 2004
- Little Bighorn (June 1876) Original Airdate: October 22, 2004
- Inch'on (September 1950)
- Marathon (490 BC) Original Airdate: September 10, 2004
- Waterloo (June 1815) Original Airdate: August 13, 2004
- Stalingrad (August 1942 – February 1943) Original Airdate: August 13, 2004
- Gulf War (Desert Shield Phase) (August 1990 – February 1991) Original Airdate: December 12, 2004
- Desert Storm (January–February 1991) Original Airdate: October 29, 2004
- Midway (June 1942)
- Saratoga (September–October 1777) Original Airdate: October 20, 2004
- Hastings (October 1066) Original Airdate: November 18, 2004

The episode titled "The Siege of Alesia" was filmed in 2003 and featured the historical reenactment groups Legio X Fretensis as the Romans and a Celtic group named "Gaestate" who modified their equipment and costume to emulate Gauls of the First Century BC.

== Spinoff ==
Command Decisions: Presidents on the Brink, a digital shortform video series featuring Doris Kearns Goodwin and focusing on US history, was released online in 2025.
