= The XY Factor =

- Genre: Documentary
- Country of origin: United States
- Original language: English

Original release
- Network: History

The XY Factor is an American documentary series that ran between 2000 and 2003 on the History Channel. It covered attitudes towards sex across various eras of history.

== Background ==
The series' episode "Sex in the Civil War" discussed how pornography and prostitutes were available to military personnel. It reported that according to lore, the American Civil War general for the Union Joseph Hooker was the source of the word "hooker".

The documentary series discussed the Bible, noting that whereas the New Testament largely omits sex, the Old Testament depicts sex in an erogenous way. The Age's Paul Kalina said of The XY Factor: Sex in the Vietnam War, "Although there's little here that we didn't know, the frank revelations—of young soldiers prowling for cheap sex, of poor women lured by the Yankee dollar and of spies bartering grenades for sexual favours—contain a hefty quotient of discomforting sauciness." The 2003 documentary reported that American military base personnel in Vietnam routinely purchased blowjobs, hashish, and heroin from prostitutes.

In a review of The XY Factor: Sex In World War II, Annmaree Bellman wrote in The Age, "this fascinating, almost pulp, instalment of the US documentary series is frank and revealing, although there's little attempt to examine the lot of the prostitutes." Susan Stewart of TV Guide reviewed the series.
