= Hunter Ellis =

American military veteran and television personality

- Born: July 5, 1968 (age 58); Alexandria, Virginia, U.S.
- Education: University of Southern California
- Occupations: Actor; Television personality
- Television: Survivor: Marquesas
- Children: 2

Hunter Ellis (born July 5, 1968 in Alexandria, Virginia) is an American military veteran and television personality.

A former naval aviator, he was first noted for his participation on Survivor before going on to host several television shows for the History Channel, including Tactical to Practical; Man, Moment, Machine; and Digging for the Truth, before hosting The CW reality show In Harm's Way. He is the current spokesperson for Atomic Beam flashlight.

== Background ==
Part of a family with a strong tradition in the United States Navy, Ellis is the grandson of Naval Aviator and Vice Admiral Donald D. Engen. He graduated from the University of Southern California with a bachelor's degree in political science, before entering the Navy as a commissioned officer and being designated as a Naval Aviator following completion of flight training. Ellis graduated first in his flight training class and, during his ten-year military service, he amassed 433 carrier landings and more than two thousand hours of flight time in the F/A-18 Hornet.

After resigning his commission, Ellis worked for a time as a pilot for FedEx Corporation.

== Personal life ==
Ellis is a member of the fraternity Alpha Tau Omega. He previously lived in Austin, Texas and currently resides in Dallas, Texas, with his wife and two children.

== Survivor: Marquesas ==
Ellis participated in the reality television program Survivor: Marquesas, which was filmed in 2001 and aired in 2002.

He was initially cast on the Maraamu tribe, alongside Gina Crews, Peter Harkey, Patricia Jackson, Sarah Jones, Rob Mariano, Sean Rector, and Vecepia Towery. Ellis was the "leader" of the tribe, and formed an alliance with Crews, which helped him survive the first two votes, but after Maraamu lost the third immunity challenge in a row, he was voted out on day 9 as he was seen as a controlling threat by Mariano.

== Post-Survivor career ==
Subsequently, Ellis became the host of several nationally televised programs. The first of these was Tactical to Practical (also known as Tactical to Practical With Hunter Ellis), which aired on The History Channel as a program that took a historical look at the development of common consumer electronic products which originated as military research projects. It lasted for three seasons, with 38 episodes airing in 2003-04.

In 2004, he began co-hosting 9 on the Town, a half-hour program airing five days a week on KCAL-TV (channel 9), an independent station in Los Angeles, California. In 2005, he began hosting another show on The History Channel, called Man, Moment, Machine. Episodes of this show focus on the historical consequences of the momentary interaction between a particular individual and a specific technology.

In 2007, Ellis became the host of Digging for the Truth, and in 2008 became host of In Harm's Way.

Ellis was a news anchor for KEYE-TV news in Austin, Texas from 2011 until he left in 2014 to focus full-time on documentaries.

=== Filmography ===
- Survivor (3 episodes, 2002)
- Tactical to Practical (2003) (TV)
- 9 on the Town (2004) (TV)
- Test Drive (1 episode, 2005) (TV)
- Man, Moment, Machine (13 episodes, 2005–2007)
- Extreme Yachts (2006) (TV)
- Digging for the Truth (8 episodes, 2007)
- In Harm's Way (2008) (TV)
- A Grail of Two Idiots (2012) (short)
- Misirlou (2013)

== Awards and recognition ==
In 2003, Ellis received an Emmy nomination for hosting Countdown to Survivor: The Amazon for KCBS-TV, and in 2006 he received a Los Angeles Emmy Award for hosting Hola! Survivor: Guatemala, also for KCBS. In an article published on December 1, 2003, People magazine named him one of the 20 sexiest men on cable television.
