= Cowboys and Outlaws =

- Country of origin: United States

Production
- Running time: 60 min

Original release
- Network: History Channel

Cowboys and Outlaws is a documentary series on the History Channel that details key figures and events in the history of the American West in the latter half of the 19th century. It uses dramatic reenactments, historian interviews and forensic evidence to highlight famous figures such as Billy the Kid, Wyatt Earp and Tom Horn. It also covers historical events such as the first drive along the Goodnight-Loving Trail and the transformation of Abilene, Kansas from a small settlement into a major cattle town.

As of February, 2010, only six episodes have aired. A DVD collection was released on January 26, 2010.

== Episodes ==
- The Real McCoy
- The Real Wyatt Earp
- The Real Lonesome Dove
- Frontier Hitman
- Range War
- The Real Billy the Kid
- Tom Horn
