= Die Glocke (conspiracy theory) =

Fictional Nazi weapon

Die Glocke (The Bell)
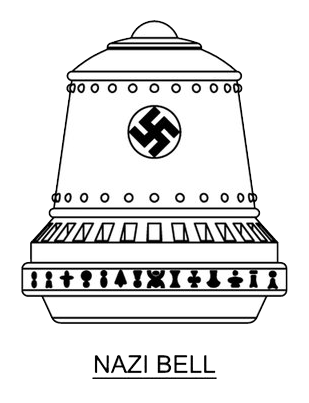
- Artist's impression of Die Glocke
- Type: Alleged wonder weapon / experimental device
- Place of origin: Nazi Germany

Service history
- In service: Alleged secret Nazi scientific project, 1940s
- Used by: Nazi Germany (alleged)
- Wars: World War II (alleged)

Production history
- Designer: Unknown (claims attributed to Nazi scientists)
- Designed: 1940s (alleged)

Specifications (Dimensions)
- Length: Approximately 12 ft (3.7 m)
- Height: approximately 15 ft (4.6 m)
- Diameter: Approximately 9 ft (2.7 m)
- Warhead: Alleged "Xerum 525" (radioactive purplish liquid)
- Main armament: Alleged plasma or antigravity device

Die Glocke (German: [diː ˈɡlɔkə], 'The Bell') is collection of hoaxes surrounding an alleged Wunderwaffe developed in the 1940s in Nazi Germany. Proponents associate it with Nazi occultism, anti-gravity, and free energy research.

Rumors of this device have persisted for decades after WW2 and were used as a plot trope in the fiction novel Lightning by Dean Koontz (1988), in the fiction television series 12 Monkeys (Season 4) and the multimedia franchise Assassin's Creed. First fully described by Polish journalist and author Igor Witkowski in Prawda o Wunderwaffe (2000), it was later popularized by military journalist and author Nick Cook, who associated it with Nazi occultism, anti-gravity, and free energy research. Mainstream reviewers have criticized claims about Die Glocke as being pseudoscientific and recycled rumors. Die Glocke, and other alleged Nazi "miracle weapons", have been dramatised in films, TV shows, video games, and novels.

== History ==
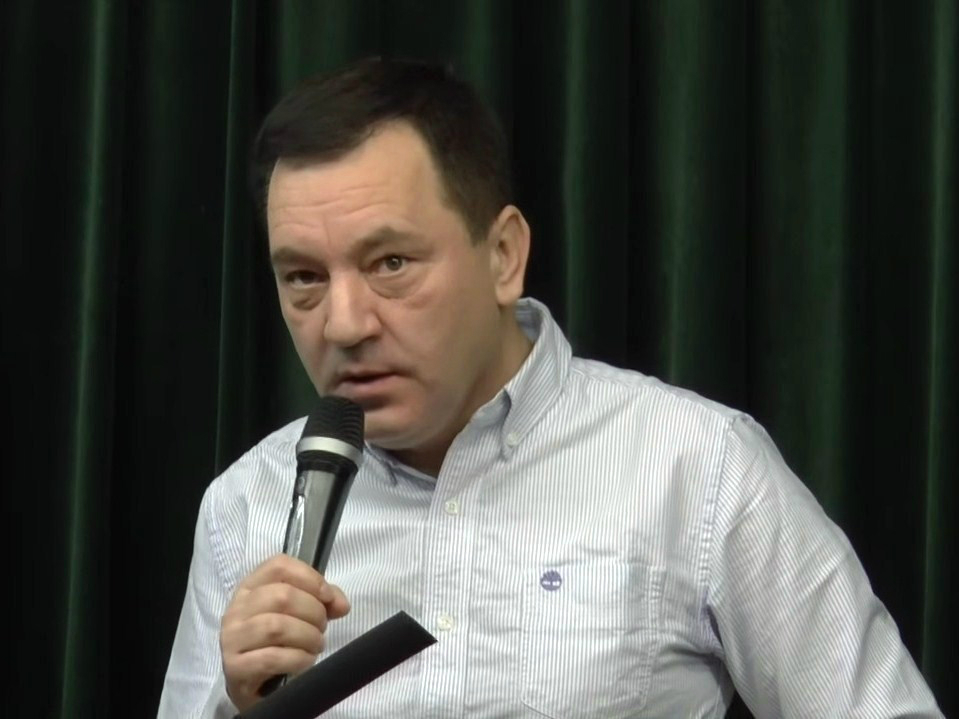
Polish author Igor Witkowski

In his 2001 book The Hunt for Zero Point, author Nick Cook identified claims about Die Glocke as having originated in the 2000 Polish book Prawda o Wunderwaffe ("The Truth About the Wonder Weapon") by Igor Witkowski. Cook described Witkowski's claims of a device called "The Bell" engineered by Nazi scientists that was "a glowing, rotating contraption" rumored to have "some kind of antigravitational effect", be a "time machine", or part of an "SS antigravity programme" for a flying saucer.

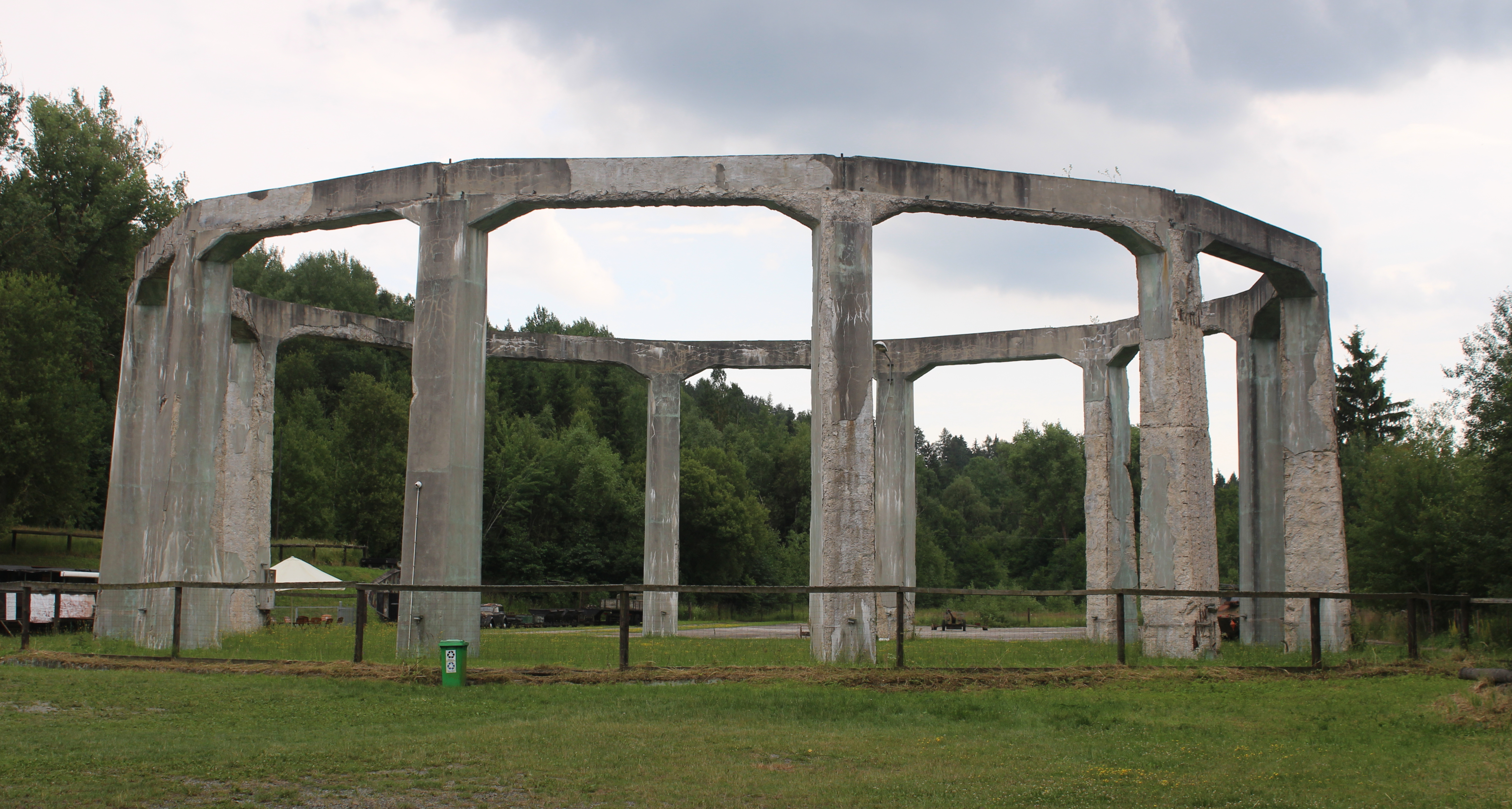
A WWII-era structure in Nowa Ruda, believed to be supports for a water tower. Conspiracy theorists purport that it was built as a testing site for Die Glocke.

According to Cook, Die Glocke was bell-shaped, about 4 metres (12 ft) high and 3 metres (9 ft) in diameter, and incorporated "two high-speed, counter-rotating cylinders filled with a purplish, liquid metallic-looking substance that was supposed to be highly radioactive, code-named 'Xerum 525.'" Cook recounts claims that "scientists and technicians who worked on the bell and who did not die of its effects were wiped out by the SS at the close of the war, and the device was moved to an unknown location". Cook proposed that SS official Hans Kammler later secretly traded this technology to the U.S. military in exchange for his freedom. Witkowski suggested that a concrete ring called "The Henge" near the Wenceslaus mine built in 1943 or 1944 and vaguely resembling Stonehenge was used to tether the Bell during tests. According to writer Jason Colavito, the structure is merely the remains of an ordinary industrial cooling tower.

Witkowski's book was translated to English in 2003. He claimed to have discovered evidence of Die Glocke in a review of WWII-era documents that were declassified by the Polish government, which led him to additional research via archives and interviews. The first document, allegedly supplied to Witkowski by an unnamed Polish government official, was an affidavit from the war crimes trial for General Jakob Sporrenberg, who supposedly confessed to ordering the murder of about 60 persons who had knowledge of the secretive project. Kurt Debus, Wernher von Braun and Walther Gerlach were also allegedly implicated in Die Glocke research. Witkowski claims Die Glocke was organized under a division of the Waffen-SS, and operated mainly at facilities in Lower Silesia. Die Glocke was conceived in early 1942, and active experimentation began in mid-1944.

Prisoners from the Gross-Rosen concentration camp were supposedly exposed to radiation from Die Glocke, resulting in many deaths and health problems. Survivors of the camp are alleged to have reported witnessing tests of Die Glocke, reporting a bright bluish light from the object.

Witkowski postulated Xerum 525 was likely an irradiated form of mercury used in the creation of a form of plasma that was intended as a weapon and/or propulsion system, and which may have been capable of distorting spacetime.

== Reception ==
Cook's publication introduced the topic in English without critically discussing the subject. More recently, historian Eric Kurlander has discussed the topic in his 2017 book on Nazi esotericism Hitler's Monsters: A Supernatural History of the Third Reich. According to reviewer Julian Strube, Kurlander "cites from the reservoir of post-war conspiracy theories" and "heavily relies on sensationalist accounts...mixing up contemporary sources with post-war sensationalist literature, half-truths, and fictitious accounts".

According to Salon reviewer Kurt Kleiner, Cook's decade as an editor at Jane's Defence Weekly "is enough to make you take a second look" at Die Glocke theories. Kleiner further notes that anti-gravity per se "can't be completely dismissed" given that it's been the subject of serious research over the years, and also agrees that researchers in Nazi Germany were working on highly advanced technology during the 1940s. Nonetheless, Kleiner concludes: "It's a story that strains credulity. But unless we're after cheap laughs, our hope when we pick up a book like this is that the author will, against the odds, build a careful, reasonable and convincing case. Cook isn't that author". Kleiner criticised Cook's work as "ferreting out minor inconsistencies and odd, ambiguous details which he tries to puff up into proof", characterised the process of evaluating Cook's claims as "untangling science from pseudo-science", and concluded that "what is instructive about the book is the insight we get into how conspiracy theories seduce otherwise reasonable people".

Skeptical author Robert Sheaffer criticised Cook's book as "a classic example of how to spin an exciting yarn based on almost nothing. He visits places where it is rumoured that secret UFO and antigravity research is going on...and writes about what he feels and imagines, although he discovers nothing more tangible than unsubstantiated rumors". Sheaffer notes that claims about Die Glocke are circulated by UFOlogists and conspiracy-oriented authors such as Jim Marrs, Joseph P. Farrell, and antigravity proponent John Dering.

Jason Colavito wrote that Witkowski's claims were "recycled reflection" of 1960s rumors of Nazi occult science, like those published in Morning of the Magicians, and describes Die Glocke as "a device few outside of fringe culture think actually existed. In short, it looks to be a hoax, or at least a wild exaggeration". Author Brian Dunning states that Morning of the Magicians helped promote belief in Die Glocke and Nazi occultism, and its absence in the historical record make it "increasingly unlikely that anything like it actually existed". According to Dunning, "all we have in the way of evidence is a third-hand anecdotal account of something that's desperately implausible, backed up by neither evidence nor even a corroborating account".

Author and historian Robert F. Dorr characterises Die Glocke as among "the most imaginative of the conspiracy theories" that arose in post-World War II years, and typical of the fantasies of magical German weapons often popularized in pulp magazines such as the National Police Gazette.

Some theories circulating on Internet conspiracy sites claim that Die Glocke is located in a Nazi gold train that is buried in a tunnel beneath a mountain in Poland. Duncan Roads, editor of Nexus, has pointed out that the "Nazis on the Moon trope" is linked to wild speculations about Nazi anti-gravitational technology, such as Witkowski's Die Glocke.

Journalist Patrick J. Kiger wrote that German propaganda of fictional Wunderwaffen combined with the secrecy surrounding actual advanced technology such as the V-2 rocket captured at war's end by the U.S. military helped spawn "sensational book-length exposes, web sites, and legions of enthusiasts who revel in rumors of science fiction-like weapons supposedly invented by Hitler’s scientists". According to Kiger, Die Glocke is a popular example of such legends and speculation, citing former aerospace scientist David Myhra's contention that if antigravity devices actually existed, the Germans, desperate to stop the Allies' advance, would have used them.

== See also ==
- Kecksburg UFO incident
- Nazi UFOs
- Project Riese
- Gross-Rosen concentration camp
