= Siberia: How the East Was Won =

- Country of origin: United States

Production
- Running time: 120 minutes with commercials

Original release
- Network: History Channel

Siberia: How the East Was Won is a 2004 documentary film that aired on the History Channel. It describes Russia's eastward expansion, beginning with the Cossack invasions some five centuries ago. The documentary was filmed English.

== Aspects of the documentary ==
- A look at a vast and misunderstood land
- Exploration of the northern forests of Asia;
- Footage of traveling on the Trans-Siberian Railway;
- Comparison of Russia's eastward expansion with the westward expansion of the United States during the nineteenth century;
- Discusses pivotal events in the history of Siberia;
- Examines the effects on Siberia of the fall of Communism at the end of the twentieth century;
- Breathtaking photography of the area's natural beauty;
- Interviews with historians and scholars;
- Interviews with residents of Siberia.

A DVD containing the documentary was released in 2004. Its run time is 100 minutes.

A&E Television issued a version of the documentary in 2008; its run time is 94 minutes.
