= That's Impossible =

Original release
- Network: History Channel

That's Impossible is a television series on the History Channel that examines seemingly impossible technologies based upon stories and inventions in history, and details exactly what is needed to turn them into reality. The show premiered on July 7, 2009 and was narrated by Jonathan Frakes.

== Format ==
A series that examines seemingly impossible stories and inventions from history, and the technology that could have turned science fiction into reality.

Each episode has a "to do list", which means that if this technology were to be perfected, it would have to do certain things on the list. That's Impossible also mentioned previous attempts or possible accomplishments of said technology.

== Episodes ==
Ep #	Name	Summary
1	"Invisibility Cloaks"	The power of true invisibility may now be possible. This episode investigates classified reports that the British military recently (in 2007) tested an invisible battle tank (a Challenger 2) using metamaterials, Jasper Maskelyne and his deception camouflage used in World War II, the Philadelphia Experiment, examines the scientific breakthroughs that may soon give us all the power of invisibility, and witnesses a remarkable demonstration of an invisibility cloak that makes a man vanish.
2	"Real Terminators"	Robots that think, move like humans and fight our wars—Real Terminators—may now be possible. At leading universities and covert government labs, robots are now being developed in man's image; cyborgs with superhuman strength, machines that may eventually be able to make decisions, even kill on their own. But will these very robots designed to protect us ultimately turn on their masters?
3	"Weather Warfare"	The power to use tornados, hurricanes and the deadliest weather as weapons of war may now be possible. We'll investigate reports that weather weapons are in development and reveal the technology that—in the future—could turn hurricanes, earthquakes, even tsunamis into some of the most powerful and plausibly deniable weapons of mass destruction the world has ever seen.
4	"Eternal Life"	An examination of the efforts being used to prolong life, including growing replacement body parts in a lab, creating microscopic robots which can eradicate deadly diseases, and reversing the aging process.
5	"Death Rays and Energy Weapons"	The focus of this episode shines on the death rays and energy weapons which have been used in the old science fiction movies, including laser cannons capable of downing a plane and nuclear missiles.
6	"Mind Control"	A look into the mind reading and control, including the possibility of communicating with people using only their minds with brainwave-transmission technology, and computers which can read a person's thought.
