= Appalachian Outlaws =

American reality television series

- Genre: Reality
- Narrated by: Robert Patrick
- Country of origin: United States
- Original language: English
- No. of seasons: 2
- No. of episodes: 16

Production
- Running time: 42 minutes

Original release
- Network: History
- Release: January 9, 2014 – April 6, 2015

Appalachian Outlaws is an American reality television series that focuses on the activities of ginseng harvesters in the forests surrounding the Appalachian Mountains. The series was partially scripted. The series premiered on January 9, 2014, on History.

== Series overview ==
| Season | Episodes | Originally released | |
| Season | Episodes | First released | Last released |
|---|---|---|---|
| 1 | 6 | January 9, 2014 | February 13, 2014 |
| 2 | 10 | February 2, 2015 | April 6, 2015 |

== Episodes ==
=== Season 1 (2014) ===
| No. overall | No. in season | Title | Original release date | US viewers (millions) |
|---|---|---|---|---|
| 1 | 1 | "Dirty Money" | January 9, 2014 | N/A |
| 2 | 2 | "Ginseng Fever" | January 16, 2014 | N/A |
| 3 | 3 | "You Have Been Warned" | January 23, 2014 | N/A |
| 4 | 4 | "Tit For Tat" | January 30, 2014 | N/A |
| 5 | 5 | "Hunted" | February 6, 2014 | N/A |
| 6 | 6 | "The Last Stand" | February 13, 2014 | N/A |

=== Season 2 (2015) ===
| No. overall | No. in season | Title | Original release date | US viewers (millions) |
|---|---|---|---|---|
| 7 | 1 | "Root Awakening" | February 2, 2015 | N/A |
| 8 | 2 | "Eye for an Eye" | February 9, 2015 | N/A |
| 9 | 3 | "Payback" | February 16, 2015 | N/A |
| 10 | 4 | "War Games" | February 23, 2015 | N/A |
| 11 | 5 | "Snakes and a Plane" | March 2, 2015 | N/A |
| 12 | 6 | "The Devil You Know" | March 9, 2015 | N/A |
| 13 | 7 | "Crossing the Line" | March 16, 2015 | N/A |
| 14 | 8 | "Unlikely Allies" | March 23, 2015 | N/A |
| 15 | 9 | "Battle at Wolf Creek" | March 30, 2015 | N/A |
| 16 | 10 | "Last Chance" | April 6, 2015 | N/A |
