= Man, Moment, Machine =

- Starring: Hunter Ellis
- Country of origin: United States
- No. of episodes: 24

Production
- Running time: 60 minutes

Original release
- Network: History Channel
- Release: 2005 – 2006

Man, Moment, Machine is a television series which aired on the History Channel and was hosted by Hunter Ellis. It documented important events of history and detailed about a machine, the point of time it was made, how it was made, and the outcome.

== Production ==
The show explores historical instances where human-machine cooperation led to transformative events or achieved technological milestones. The show's first season had 14 episodes. The show was produced by Edelman Productions and staffed by five crew members and six cast members. For the show's second season, the episode about the Apollo 13 mission was filmed at the Cosmosphere. The production team visited Mare Island to film three episodes.

== Episodes ==
=== Season 1 ===
1. Hunting Bonnie and Clyde
2. The Great Sub Rescue
3. Doolittle's Daring Raid
4. Stormin' Norman and the Abrams Tank
5. Shot Down: The U-2 Spyplane
6. Mine Rescue Mask
7. Wernher von Braun and the V2 Rocket
8. Thomas Edison and the Electric Chair
9. Howard Hughes and the Spruce Goose
10. Ultimate Weapon: Oppenheimer and the Atomic Bomb
11. The Higgins Landing Craft
12. Dam Buster: World War II's Bouncing Bomb
13. 25,000 Miles non-stop: Voyager Spacecraft
14. Sikorsky and the Rescue Chopper

== Season 2 ==
1. Apollo 13: Triumph on the Dark Side
2. Patton and the Desperate Tank Attack
3. Alexander the Great and the Torsion Catapult
4. Al Capone and the Machine Gun Massacre
5. Stormin' Norman and the Stealth Fighter
6. Lincoln and the Flying Spy Machine
7. Alexander Graham Bell and the Astonishing Telephone
8. Da Vinci and the Handgun
9. The Red Baron and the Wings of Death
10. Saddam Hussein and the Nerve Gas Atrocity
11. Galileo and the Sinful Spy Glass
12. Enzo Ferrari and the Historic Race
13. JFK and the Crisis Crusader

== Reception ==
Sierra Filucci of Common Sense Media penned a mixed review of the show. She praised the show for how "its unique method of storytelling" could "bring a new energy to a familiar event". She criticized the show, writing, "But aside from its relatively innovative approach, the show feels a lot like many other documentary-style programs that look back on historical moments." In a mixed review, Angus Batey of The Times wrote about the episode featuring Barnes Wallis and the bouncing bomb, "The approach irritates: the American actors' accents slip in the numerous reconstructions, and the presenter, Hunter Ellis, strolls around tropical locations for no real reason. But the story of a determined inventor helping to win the war is strong enough to triumph."
