= Tactical to Practical =

- Also known as: Tactical to Practical with Hunter Ellis
- Genre: Documentary
- Presented by: Hunter Ellis
- Composer: Michael Richard Plowman
- Country of origin: United States
- Original language: English
- No. of seasons: 3

Production
- Executive producer: Steve Edelman
- Producer: Christopher J. Bauer

Original release
- Network: History Channel
- Release: 1 September 2003 – 1 September 2005

Tactical to Practical with Hunter Ellis is a television series that ran from 2003 to 2005 on the History Channel. Each episode documents ways in which technologies utilized by the civilian public were originally developed to serve military purposes. The show is hosted by Hunter Ellis.
