= H2 (A&E Networks) =

Multinational brand of television channels

- Logo used since 2021
- Country: United States
- Broadcast area: Worldwide
- Headquarters: Brooklyn, New York City

Programming
- Language: English
- Picture format: 1080i HDTV

Ownership
- Owner: A+E Global Media
- Sister channels: List of Sky UK channels

History
- Launched: September 2011
- Closed: October 1, 2022 (Southeast Asia)

H2 (or History2) is a brand name owned by A+E Global Media (a joint venture between the Hearst Communications and the Walt Disney Television division of The Walt Disney Company), used for a sister TV network of History. The brand was debuted in September 2011 when History International in the United States was relaunched as H2. The brand was expanded outside the U.S. since then. H2 in the United States was relaunched on February 29, 2016 as Vice TV, but the H2 brand is still used for sister channels to History in other markets.

A&E Networks began rebranding the remaining versions of H2 as History2, starting with Latin American version on January 1, 2019.

On November 6, 2018, concerning Disney's proposed acquisition of 21st Century Fox, the European Commission required Disney to sell A&E's television operations in Europe, which include the versions of H2 in the area.

== North America ==
The H2 brand was introduced in the United States, when History International was re-branded as such on September 26, 2011, with its programming refocused to feature documentary content from its sister network History, prior to that network's shift towards more reality programming. The American channel was subsequently replaced by Viceland on February 29, 2016.

== Canada ==
On August 27, 2012, Shaw Media, relaunched the male-focused Category A digital channel, The Cave as a domestic Canadian version of H2.

== Latin America ==
In 2014, a Latin American version of H2 was launched under the ownership of A+E Networks Latin America (a joint venture between A+E Networks and Ole Communications) and distributed by Ole Distribution. On January 1, 2019, H2 was re-branded as History2.

== Europe ==
Logo used from 2020 to 2024 in the United Kingdom and Ireland

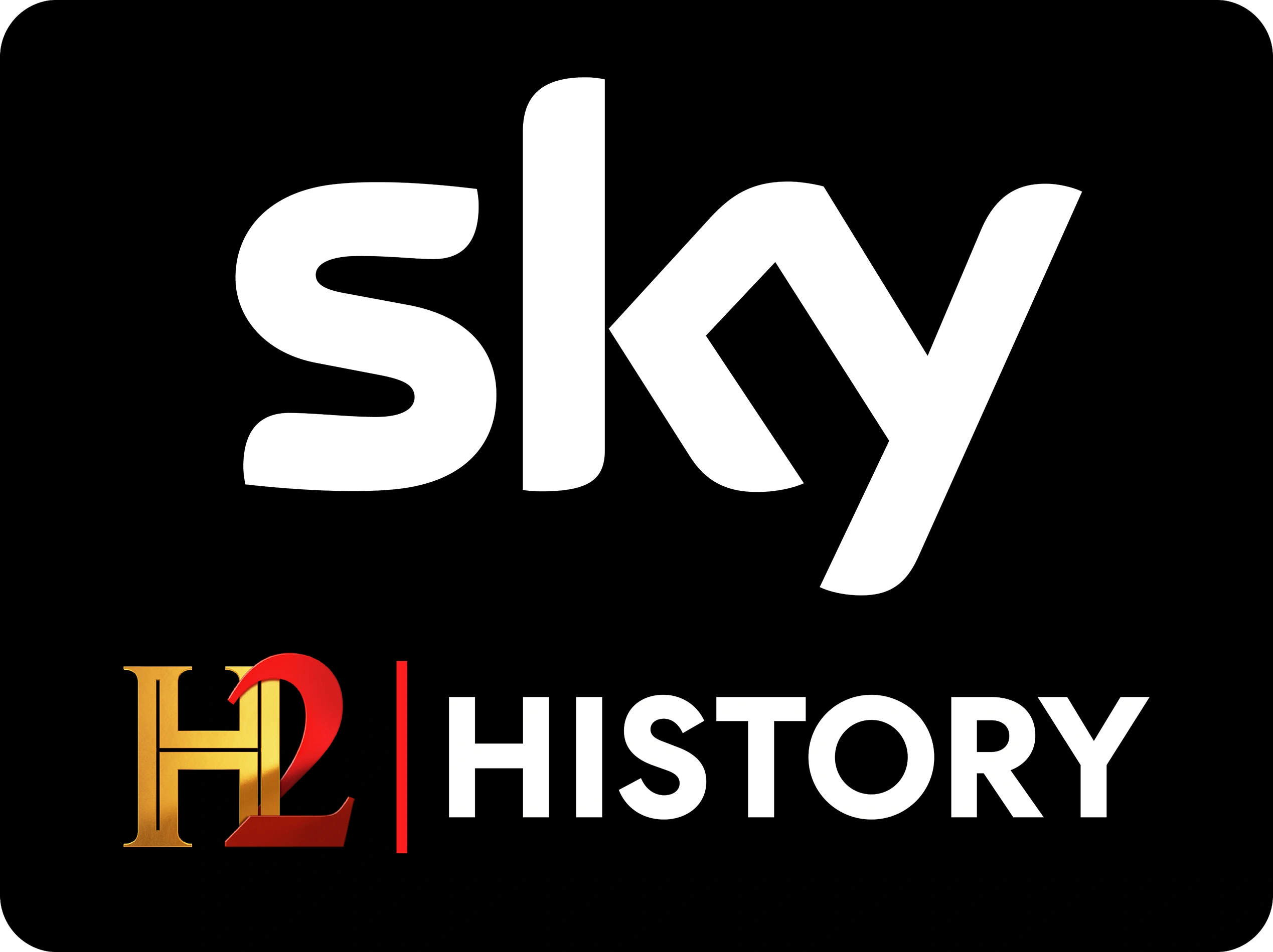
Logo used from 24 February to 28 September 2026 in the United Kingdom and Ireland

Logo used of MysteryX since 29 September 2026 in the United Kingdom and Ireland

=== Croatia ===
The Croatian version of H2 was launched on February 1, 2018 on Hrvatski Telekom's MaxTV.

=== Poland ===
The Polish version of H2 was launched on October 28, 2014. On 6 February 2019, the channel was rebranded as History2.

=== Serbia ===
On April 12, 2015, the Serbian version of H2 was launched to Orion TV customers. It was also made available to MTS TV customers in May of that year.

=== United Kingdom and Ireland ===
==== Military History ====
On May 4, 2013, the local version of Military History was re-branded as H2. The channel launched on TalkTalk on August 28, 2014, and a few months later on BT TV. An HD version launched on Virgin Media on December 1, 2015, and later on BT TV in October 2016.

==== History2 & Sky History2 ====
On February 6, 2019, this version was re-branded again as History2. On May 27, 2020, to coincide with the launches of Sky Documentaries and Sky Nature, History and History2 rebranded to Sky History and Sky History2, respectively, in the UK and Ireland.

==== MysteryX ====
On September 29, 2026, Sky History2 was rebranded to MysteryX.

== MENA ==
In the Middle East and North Africa, the regional version of H2 is available on OSN since February 1, 2016.

== Asia ==
In Southeast Asia, A+E Networks launched a regional version of H2 on June 14, 2013. After 9 years of broadcasting, H2 Asia ceased broadcasting on 1 October 2022.

== Australia ==
In Australia, H2 became available on 9Now in 2025.

== See also ==
- List of programs broadcast by History (TV channel)
