= Hangar 1: The UFO Files =

- Genre: Ufology; Conspiracy theory
- Starring: Jan Harzan (MUFON); John Ventre (MUFON); Jeremy Ray (MUFON); Jason McClellan (Open Minds Radio)
- Narrated by: Cornell Womack

Production
- Executive producers: Paul Villadolid; Doug Segal
- Producer: Christopher Lauer
- Camera setup: Multiple
- Running time: 43 minutes
- Production company: Go Go Luckey Productions

Original release
- Network: H2
- Release: February 28, 2014 – June 26, 2015

Hangar 1: The UFO Files is an American ufology television series that premiered on February 28, 2014 on H2. It was produced by Go Go Luckey Productions.

The Mutual UFO Network (MUFON) provides files from their archives of UFO sightings as the basis for episodes of Hangar 1.

== Episodes ==
Color Key

Season	No. episodes	Year(s) aired
1	8	2014
2	12	2015

=== Season 1 (2014) ===
Season 1 started on February 28, 2014 on H2 Channel in North America.

No. overall	No. in season	Title	Original release date
1	1	"Presidential Encounters"	February 28, 2014
2	2	"Underground Bases"	March 7, 2014
3	3	"Alien Technology"	March 14, 2014
4	4	"Crashes and Cover-ups"	March 21, 2014
5	5	"American Hotspots"	March 28, 2014
6	6	"Space Weapons"	April 4, 2014
7	7	"Unfriendly Skies"	April 11, 2014
8	8	"Shadow Government"	April 18, 2014

=== Season 2 (2015) ===
Season 2 started on April 10, 2015.

No. overall	No. in season	Title	Original release date
9	1	"UFOs at War"	April 10, 2015
10	2	"Underwater UFOs"	April 17, 2015
11	3	"Men in Black"	April 24, 2015
12	4	"Far Side of the Moon"	May 1, 2015
13	5	"Star People"	May 8, 2015
14	6	"Hunted by UFOs"	May 15, 2015
15	7	"UFOs Over Texas"	May 22, 2015
16	8	"The Smoking Gun"	May 29, 2015
17	9	"Cops vs. UFOs"	June 5, 2015
18	10	"Captured Aliens"	June 12, 2015
19	11	"Extreme Close Encounters"	June 19, 2015
20	12	"UFO Superpowers"	June 26, 2015

== International broadcast ==
The series premiered in Australia on June 11, 2015 on the Australian version of The History Channel.

== See also ==
- List of topics characterized as pseudoscience
- Ancient Aliens
- UFO Files
- Unidentified flying object (UFO)
