= Amir Hussain =

Canadian-American educator and scholar of religion

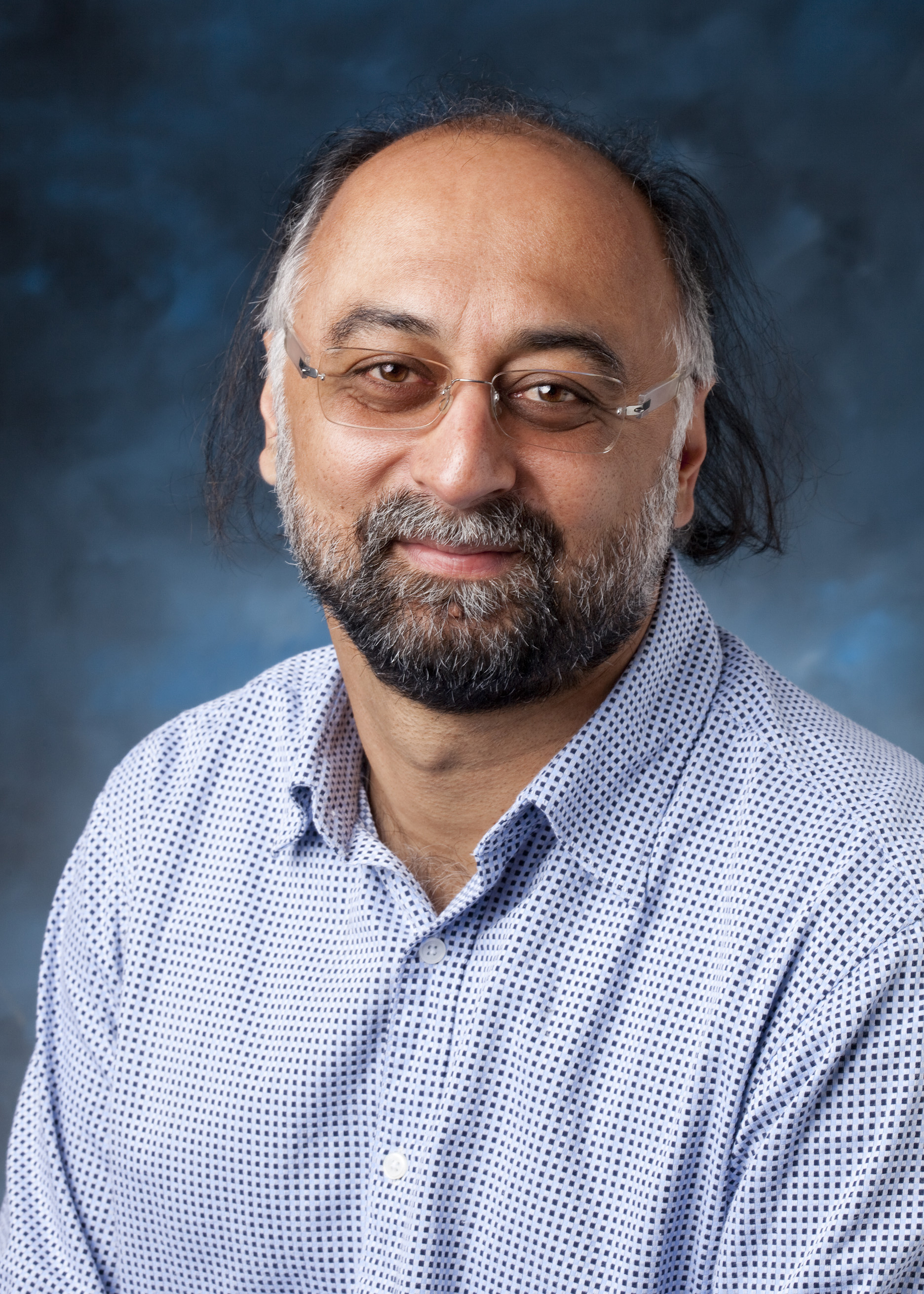
- Born: Lahore, Pakistan

Academic background
- Education: University of Toronto
- Thesis: The Canadian face of Islam: Muslim communities in Toronto (2001)

Academic work
- Discipline: Islam, interfaith dialog
- Institutions: California State University, Northridge; Loyola Marymount University
- Website: amirhussain.lmu.build

Amir Hussain is a scholar of religion who specializes in the study of Islam. He is a professor in the Department of Theological Studies at Loyola Marymount University in Los Angeles. In 2023 he served as President of the American Academy of Religion. He is the editor-in-chief of the Oxford Encyclopedia of Islam in North America, which was published in 2026. In 2025, he published One God and Two Religions with Fortress Press. He has done other significant publishing work with Oxford University Press, including editing the fifth editions (2018) of two of their main textbooks, World Religions: Western Traditions and World Religions: Eastern Traditions, and the third edition of A Concise Introduction to World Religions.

== Early and personal life ==
Born in Lahore, Pakistan, and raised in Toronto, Ontario, Canada, Hussain received a Ph.D. and M.A. in the study of religion from the University of Toronto. He speaks fluently in four languages, including: Arabic, English, French, and Urdu.

Hussain is a lifelong fan of the Los Angeles Lakers and the Montreal Canadiens. A standout athlete in college, Hussain became close friends with former UCLA basketball coach, John Wooden.

== Career ==
Before moving to Loyola Marymount University, Hussain taught as an associate professor of Religious Studies at California State University, Northridge.

A proponent of interfaith dialogue, Professor Hussain has published over 60 scholarly articles or book chapters on Islam and Muslims. He has lectured in academic arenas around the world, and appeared on several television programs, most notably Politically Incorrect with Bill Maher and The Tavis Smiley Show. He was a consultant for The Story of God with Morgan Freeman, and appears regularly on Ancient Aliens, History's Greatest Mysteries with Laurence Fishburne, Holy Marvels with Dennis Quaid, and The UnXplained with William Shatner.

Professor Hussain is also a senior editor for religion for Oxford Handbooks Online. Prior to his edited textbooks, he wrote Muslims and the Making of America, published in 2016 by Baylor University Press. From 2011 to 2015 he was the editor of the Journal of the American Academy of Religion, the flagship journal for the study of religion. He is also on the editorial boards of four other scholarly journals for the study of religion. In 2005, he joined the Department of Theological Studies at Loyola Marymount University, the Jesuit university in Los Angeles. He has written numerous scholarly articles on Islam and Muslims, and is recognized as an authority on Islam in North America. He is a fellow of the Los Angeles Institute for the Humanities. Professor Hussain also gave the University of Toronto a scholarship known as the Shannon L. Hamm Award.

== Works ==
- The Oxford Encyclopedia of Islam in North America, (Oxford University Press, 2026)
- One God and Two Religions: Christians and Muslims as Neighbors, (Fortress Press, 2025)
- World Religions: Western Traditions, fifth edition (Oxford University Press, 2018)
- World Religions: Eastern Traditions, fifth edition (Oxford University Press, 2018)
- Muslims and the Making of America, (Baylor University Press, 2016)
- A Concise Introduction to World Religions, third edition (Oxford University Press, 2015)
- Oil and Water: Two Faiths, One God, (Wood Lake Books, 2006)
