= Giorgio A. Tsoukalos =

Swiss-born TV presenter and producer

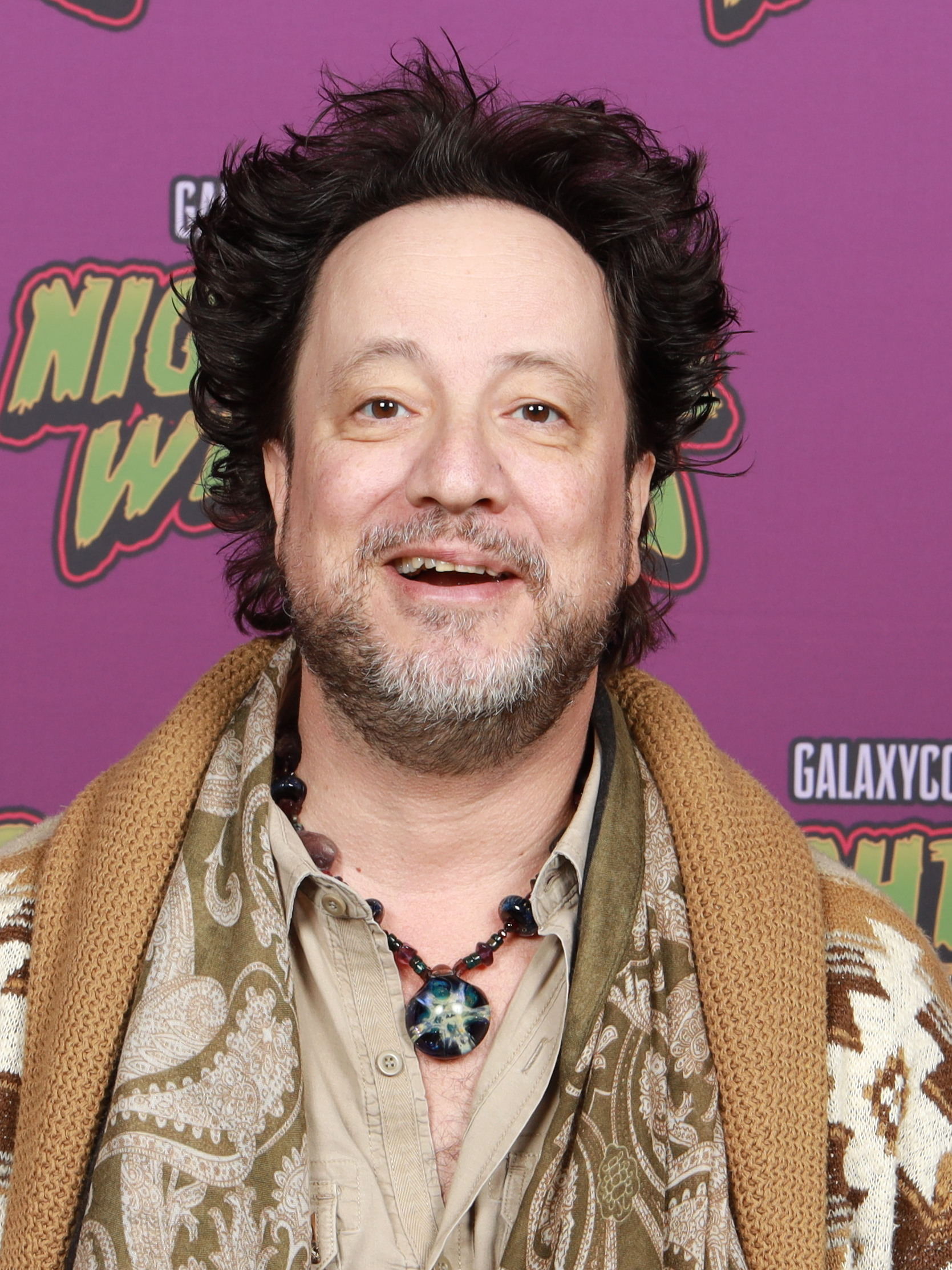
- Tsoukalos in 2025
- Born: 1978 (age 47–48); Lucerne, Switzerland
- Education: Ithaca College
- Occupations: Writer; Television presenter; Television producer
- Website: thealiensguy.com

Giorgio A. Tsoukalos (/ˈsuːkələs/; Greek: Γεώργιος Τσούκαλος; born 1978) is a Swiss-born writer, and television presenter and producer. He is a ufologist and a promoter of the ancient astronauts conspiracy theory. He is host and producer of Ancient Aliens, a History Channel series.

== Career ==
Tsoukalos is of Greek-Austrian heritage. He is a 1998 graduate of Ithaca College in Ithaca, New York, with a bachelor's degree in Communications. From 1999 to 2007, he worked as a promoter for IFBB-sanctioned bodybuilding contests, including Mr. Olympia. He was a promoter and contest director for IFBB San Francisco events from 2001 to 2005.

Since 2002, Tsoukalos has appeared in programs broadcast by Travel Channel, History Channel, Syfy, and National Geographic. He was the editor of Legendary Times magazine from 1999 to 2008. He is a co-executive producer of Ancient Aliens franchise, and since 2009 he has appeared in more than 300 episodes. He presented and co-produced the 2014 H2 series In Search of Aliens.

=== Ancient Aliens meme ===
Tsoukalos's appearances in Ancient Aliens inspired a meme highlighting his unusual hairstyle overlaid with the caption: "I'm not saying it was aliens ... but ..." Variations of the meme were uploaded by users as early as November 2010. According to Dictionary.com, the meme mimicked "the tone of conviction used by Tsoukalos to present unfounded far-fetched pseudo-logic as fact."

In a 2015 Reddit "Ask Me Anything" interview, Tsoukalos said he loved the meme, adding "it's a great honor to have been embraced" by Internet users. During a 2016 appearance on CNN Philippines, Tsoukalos's "meme-ification" was discussed at length. A partial transcript of the interview was later published online as "Meet the Hair Guy from Ancient Aliens."

Tsoukalos made a cameo appearance in the 2021 Resident Alien episode "Welcome Aliens". He was described by the lead character as "that high-haired gentleman". The episode included several references to the Ancient Aliens meme. Tsoukalos reprised his cameo in the episode "Best of Enemies".

A Meme Studio analysis of Google Trends placed the Ancient Aliens meme fourth in its list of the 20 most-searched meme templates in the United States. Between June 2024 and May 2025 the meme was searched more than 2,000 time per month when paired with "meme generator" or "template".

== Filmography ==
=== Television ===
Year	Title	Role	Notes	Ref
2002	In Search of	Self	1 episode; Credited as an Egyptologist	
2003	Is It Real?	Self	Episode: "Ancient Astronauts"	
2003	Is There a Stargate?	Self	Documentary short	
2007	Mysterious Journeys	Self	3 episodes	
2008	Indiana Jones and the Ultimate Quest	Self	TV documentary	
2009	Race to Witch Mountain	Giorgio (cameo)	Uncredited appearance	
2009	UFO Hunters	Self	3 episodes	
2009–2026	Ancient Aliens	Self	281 episodes; Co-executive producer	
2010	Extreme Universe	Self	Episode: "Star Gates"	
2011	The Mo'Nique Show	Self	Episode dated July 21, 2011	
2013	Contacto Extraterrestre	Giorgio Tsoukalos (cameo)	Episode: "Caídos a Tierra"	
2013	America's Book of Secrets	Self	Episode: "The Ancient Astronaut Cover-Up"	
2014	In Search of Aliens	Self / Presenter	10 episodes; Co-executive producer	
2015	Ancient Aliens: The Ultimate Evidence	Self / Presenter	7 episodes; Consulting producer	
2016	CNN Philippines	Self / Guest	Featured interview	
2017	Ancient Aliens Declassified	Self	6 episodes; Highlights from Ancients Aliens	
2017	Next Week with Jeff Durbin	Self / Guest	Episode: "Conspiracy Theories and Sam McClure"; Archive footage	
2018	BuzzFeed Unsolved: Supernatural	Self	Episode: "The Unexplained Phoenix Lights Phenomenon"	
2018	The Noite com Danilo Gentili	Self / Guest	Episode: "Ufólogos"	
2018–2019	WGN Morning News	Self / Guest	2 episodes; National news program	
2019	Truth-Seekers	Giorgio Tsoukalos (cameo)	Short film	
2020	The UnXplained	Self	Episode: "The Truth About UFO's"	
2021–22	Resident Alien	Giorgio Tsoukalos (cameo)	2 episodes	
2022	Les Secrets du miracle de Fatima	Self	TV documentary; Archive footage	
2022–2024	Ancient Aliens: Special Presentation	Self / Presenter	24 episodes; Co-executive producer	
2023	1st Annual 4bidden Conscious Awards	Self / Presenter	TV special	
2023	Jesse Watters Primetime	Self / Guest	Episode aired September 13, 2023	
2024	2nd Annual 4bidden Conscious Awards	Self / Presenter	TV special	
2024–26	Ancient Aliens: Origins	Self	12 episodes; Co-executive producer	

=== Radio and podcast appearances ===
Year	Program	Host	Episodes	Ref
2008–2016	Coast to Coast AM	George Noory	9 episodes	
2009	Donna Seebo Show	Donna Seebo	Episode dated September 2, 2009	
2010	The Spirit Revolution	Kathleen McGowan, Philip Coppens	Episode dated November 16, 2010	
2010	When Pigs Fly	Andrew Feder	Episode dated October 22, 2010	
2010–2012	Life Changes Show	Filippo Voltaggio	2 episodes	
2011	Connecting The Light	Mike Quinsey	Episode dated May 6, 2011	
2011	The Metaphysical Hour	Dolores Cannon	Episode dated June 3, 2011; Published as podcast in 2021	
2011–12	The Joe Rogan Experience	Joe Rogan	2 episodes	
2017	Hysteria 51		Episode: "Pyramids of Giza"; Archive audio	
2025	Intergalaktiskt		Episode: "Zeus var chefsalien"	
2025	On the Phone with John Mingione	John Mingione	Episode: "On the Phone With: Giorgio Tsoukalos"	
