= Foxstar Productions =

Television production subsidiary of News Corporation

- Company type: Division
- Industry: Television Production
- Founded: 1993; 33 years ago
- Founders: Kevin Burns; Steve Bell
- Defunct: 2005; 21 years ago
- Fate: Folded into Fox Television Studios
- Successor: Fox Television Studios
- Parent: 20th Century Fox Television (1993–1999); Fox Television Studios (1999–2005)

Foxstar Productions was a television production subsidiary of News Corporation. It was founded in 1993 to make TV movies and mini-series under Steve Bell (the former network production president of 20th Century Fox Television) and producer Kevin Burns. That same year, they entered the television documentary business through its production subsidiary, Van Ness Films.

Many of their programs have and can be seen on networks such as A&E, CBS, National Geographic Channel, E!, Animal Planet, AMC, Bravo, We TV, Travel Channel, Lifetime, The History Channel and Syfy.

In 1999, Foxstar became part of the newly formed Fox Television Studios and continued producing documentaries, non-fiction programming and specials. By 2005, Kevin Burns already had several non-fiction programs under his Prometheus Entertainment shingle.

In 2005, Foxstar Productions disbanded, and folded into Fox Television Studios (then Fox 21 Television Studios, later bought by The Walt Disney Company, and turned into Touchstone Television until it folded into 20th Television in 2020).

== Filmography ==
- Biography (1987–2003)
- Alien Nation TV movies (1994–1997)
- Carol Burnett: The Special Years (1994)
- The Fantasy Worlds of Irwin Allen (1995)
- A Hollywood Christmas (1996)
- 20th Century-Fox: The First 50 Years (1997)
- Hidden Hollywood (1997–1999)
- Monster Mania (1997–2000)
- To the Galaxy and Beyond with Mark Hamill (1997)
- Behind the Planet of the Apes (1998)
- Beyond Titanic (1998)
- Celebrity Profile (1998–2001)
- Famous Families (1998–1999)
- Hugh Hefner: American Playboy Revisited (1998)
- Leonardo DiCaprio: A Life in Progress (1998)
- Lost in Space Forever (1998)
- TV Guide Looks at Christmas (1998)
- TV Guide Looks at COPS (1998)
- Attack of the 50 Foot Monster Mania (1999)
- Hollywood Screen Tests (1999)
- Hollywood's Hot Wheels (1999)
- Backstory (2000–2005)
- Bride of Monster Mania (2000)
- The Fly Papers: The Buzz on Hollywood's Scariest Insect (2000)
- Hollywood at Your Feet: The Story of the Chinese Theatre Footprints (2000)
- Hollywood Rocks the Movies: The Early Years (1955–1970) (2000)
- Twentieth Century Fox: The Blockbuster Years (2000)
- World's Best (2000-2002)
- Cleopatra: The Film That Changed Hollywood (2001)
- The Great Escape: A Standing Ovation (2001)
- The Great Escape: Bringing Fact to Fiction (2001)
- The Great Escape: The Flight to Freedom (2001)
- The Great Escape: Preparations for Freedom (2001)
- History vs. Hollywood (2001–2002)
- Marilyn Monroe: The Final Days (2001)
- The Omen Legacy (2001)
- The Alien Saga (2002)
- Biography of a Corpse (2002)
- Hollywood Rocks the Movies: The 1970s (2002)
- Playboy: Inside the Playboy Mansion (2002)
- ShirleyMania (2002)
- Monsterama (2003)
- Sex at 24 Frames Per Second (2003)
- Animal Icons (2004–2005)
- Love Hollywood Style (2004)
- Playboy: 50 Years of Playmates (2004)

== See also ==
- Fox Lab
- 20th Television
- 20th Century Studios
