= Empire of Dreams: The Story of the Star Wars Trilogy =

2004 documentary film by Kevin Burns

- Genre: Documentary
- Written by: Ed Singer
- Directed by: Kevin Burns; Edith Becker
- Starring: George Lucas; Mark Hamill
- Narrated by: Robert Clotworthy
- Composer: John Williams
- Country of origin: United States
- Original language: English

Production
- Producer: Edith Becker
- Editors: Troy Bogert; David Comtois; Scott B. Morgan; Molly Shock
- Running time: 150 min
- Production companies: Prometheus Entertainment; Fox Television Studios; Lucasfilm Ltd.

Original release
- Network: A&E Network (edited)
- Release: October 2004

Empire of Dreams: The Story of the Star Wars Trilogy is a 2004 documentary film directed by Kevin Burns and narrated by Robert Clotworthy. It documents the making of the original Star Wars trilogy: Star Wars (1977), The Empire Strikes Back (1980), and Return of the Jedi (1983), and their impact on popular culture.

The two-and-a-half-hour-long documentary was produced as a bonus disc for the DVD box set of the Star Wars Trilogy, released on September 21, 2004. A shortened version of the documentary premiered on the A&E Network later that fall. The TV version ran at around ninety minutes, cutting out nearly an hour of content.

== Content ==
The documentary is strictly chronological, divided into five parts, from the beginning of George Lucas' career as a filmmaker, to the complicated production of Star Wars in 1976, to the impact of the film, and its sequels, have made on the world today. It features interviews with George Lucas and major cast and crew members. The documentary puts Star Wars into a sociological and political perspective by using interviews with spectators such as Walter Cronkite.

The film was shot in 1.78:1 aspect ratio.

The documentary is available for streaming on Disney+, but was edited to show a newer version of Darth Vader's duel with Obi-Wan Kenobi from Star Wars. Production footage was also remastered for a cleaner look, and changed to remove a cigarette from Harrison Ford's hand in one such clip with Mark Hamill and Carrie Fisher on set together.

Comedic actor Bill Hader was a production assistant on this documentary.

== Featured interviews ==
People interviewed are:

- George Lucas (filmmaker, creator of Star Wars)
- Walter Cronkite (journalist)
- Steven Spielberg (filmmaker and friend of George Lucas)
- Irvin Kershner (director of The Empire Strikes Back)
- Howard Kazanjian (producer of Return of the Jedi)
- Gary Kurtz (producer of Star Wars and The Empire Strikes Back)
- Leo Braudy (professor and cultural historian at USC)
- Bill Moyers (journalist)
- Mark Hamill ("Luke Skywalker")
- Harrison Ford ("Han Solo")
- Carrie Fisher ("Princess Leia Organa")
- Gareth Wigan (former production executive for 20th Century Fox)
- Alan Ladd, Jr. (former studio chief for 20th Century Fox)
- Ralph McQuarrie (conceptual artist for original Star Wars trilogy)
- Richard Edlund (cameraman, miniature and optical effects for ILM)
- Steve Gawley (model maker for ILM)
- John Dykstra (visual effects supervisor for ILM)
- Paul Huston (model maker for ILM)
- Joe Johnston (visual effects art director for ILM)
- Lorne Peterson (model maker for ILM)
- Dennis Muren (visual effects for ILM)
- Peter Mayhew ("Chewbacca")
- Kenny Baker ("R2-D2")
- Anthony Daniels ("C-3PO")
- Norman Reynolds (art director and production designer)
- Robert Watts (production supervisor)
- Peter Diamond (stunt coordinator)
- Richard Chew (film editor)
- Paul Hirsch (film editor)
- Ken Ralston (visual effects)
- Ben Burtt (sound designer)
- James Earl Jones (voice of "Darth Vader")
- Phil Tippett (stop-motion animator)
- John Williams (composer)
- Sid Ganis (former marketing director for Lucasfilm)
- Lawrence Kasdan (co-screenwriter of The Empire Strikes Back and Return of the Jedi)
- Billy Dee Williams ("Lando Calrissian")
- Stuart Freeborn (makeup and special creature design)
- Frank Oz ("Yoda")
- Charles Weber (former president at Lucasfilm)
- Jim Bloom (production supervisor)
- Warwick Davis ("Wicket W. Warrick")

Featured in archive footage are:

- William Katt (auditioned for Luke Skywalker)
- Kurt Russell (auditioned for Han Solo)
- Perry King (auditioned for Han Solo)
- Terri Nunn (auditioned for Princess Leia Organa)
- Cindy Williams (auditioned for Princess Leia Organa)
- Sir Alec Guinness ("Obi-Wan Kenobi")
- David Prowse (Darth Vader in costume)
- Peter Cushing ("Governor Tarkin")
- Richard Marquand (director of Return of the Jedi)

== Reception ==
The documentary was nominated for an Emmy Award for Outstanding Sound Editing (Non-fiction).

== See also ==
- The Making of Star Wars
- Star Wars: The Legacy Revealed
