= In Search of Aliens =

- Genre: Pseudoscience; Ufology; Conspiracy theory
- Presented by: Giorgio A. Tsoukalos
- Country of origin: United States
- Original language: English
- No. of seasons: 1
- No. of episodes: 10

Production
- Executive producer: Kevin Burns
- Camera setup: Multiple
- Running time: 42 minutes
- Production company: Prometheus Entertainment

Original release
- Network: H2
- Release: July 25 – October 3, 2014

In Search of Aliens is an American television series that premiered on July 25, 2014, on the H2 channel. Produced by Prometheus Entertainment, the program features Giorgio A. Tsoukalos, a leading contributor to the television show Ancient Aliens who promotes the pseudoscientific notion that ancient astronauts visited Earth and influenced human culture.

The show has received criticism from critics and organizations such as the Southern Poverty Law Center, who describe the show as promoting "racist pseudo-scholarship".

== Episodes ==
- Episode 1: The Hunt for Atlantis
- Episode 2: Nazi Time Travelers
- Episode 3: The Mystery of Loch Ness
- Episode 4: The Roswell Rock
- Episode 5: Searching for Bigfoot
- Episode 6: The Mystery of the Cyclops
- Episode 7: The Mystery of Puma Punku
- Episode 8: The Founding of America
- Episode 9: The Mystery of Nazca
- Episode 10: The Alien Code

== Criticism ==
According to reviewer Jason Colavito, the information presented in the show "added up to nothing", there was "no overriding thesis or purpose", and Tsoukalos admits "he doesn’t buy into what his interviewees said". Colavito wrote that "In Search of Aliens is an ersatz America Unearthed that lacks even the dubious expertise of Scott F. Wolter, who, for all his faults, produces more interesting television by having the courage of his convictions and coming to lunatic conclusions from a consistent (if skewed) reading of “evidence” he investigates".

Colavito named ancient astronauts as "one of the more elaborate theories in pseudo-history with a racist component”. According to Alexander Zaitchik writing for the Southern Poverty Law Center's Hatewatch blog, shows that promote fringe history like In Search of Aliens are embraced by the far right because they help in "raising the profile of racist pseudo-scholarship", such as German writer Jan Udo Holey, whose antisemitic books have been banned across Europe.

== See also ==
- List of topics characterized as pseudoscience
- Pseudoarchaeology
- Ancient Aliens
- Unsealed Alien Files
- In Search of... (TV series)
