= American Cinema Editors Awards 2010 =

60th ACE Eddie Awards
- Presented by: American Cinema Editors
- Date: February 14, 2010
- Site: The Beverly Hilton, Beverly Hills, California

Highlights
- Best Film: Drama: The Hurt Locker
- Best Film: Musical or Comedy: The Hangover

The 60th American Cinema Editors Eddie Awards, which were presented on Sunday, February 14, 2010 at the Beverly Hilton Hotel, honored the best editors in films and television.

== Winners and nominees ==
=== Film ===
Best Edited Feature Film – Dramatic:

- Chris Innis & Bob Murawski - The Hurt Locker
  - Stephen E. Rivkin & John Refoua & James Cameron - Avatar
  - Julian Clarke - District 9
  - Mary Jo Markey & Maryann Brandon - Star Trek
  - Dana Glauberman - Up in the Air

Best Edited Feature Film – Comedy or Musical:

- Debra Neil-Fisher – The Hangover
  - Joe Hutshing & David Moritz – It's Complicated
  - Richard Marks – Julie & Julia
  - Roderick Jaynes – A Serious Man
  - Alan Edward Bell – 500 Days of Summer

Best Edited Animated Feature Film:

- Kevin Nolting – Up
  - Christopher Murrie & Ronald Sanders – Coraline
  - Andrew Weisblum – Fantastic Mr. Fox

Best Edited Documentary Film:

- Geoffrey Richman – The Cove
  - Kim Roberts – Food Inc.
  - Don Brochu, Brandon Key, Tim Patterson & Kevin Stitt -
    Michael Jackson's This Is It

=== Television ===
Best Edited Mini-Series or Motion Picture for Television:

- Alan Heim & Lee Percy – Grey Gardens
  - John Bloom & Antonia Van Drimmelen – Into the Storm
  - Lee Percy & Brian A. Kates – Taking Chance

Best Edited One Hour Series for Commercial Television:

- Lynne Willingham – Breaking Bad "ABQ"
  - Christopher Nelson – Lost "The Life and Death of Jeremy Bentham"
  - Leon Ortiz Gil – 24 "8pm-9pm"
  - Randy Jon Morgan & Jacque Toberen – ER "And in the End"

Best Edited One Hour Series for Non-Commercial Television:

- Louis Cioffi – Dexter "Remains to be Seen"
  - Louise Innes – True Blood "Hard-Hearted Hannah"
  - Stewart Schill – Dexter "Living the Dream"

Best Edited Reality Series:

- Kelly Coskran & Josh Earl – The Deadliest Catch "Stay Focused or Die"
  - Annie Tighe, Alan Hoang, Adrianne Salisbury & Kevin Leffler
    Top Chef "The Last Supper"
  - Jonathan Braun, Brad Ley, Sven Pape & Molly Shock
    Expedition Africa "Stanley and Livingstone"

=== Student Film Awards ===
- Andrew Hellesen - Chapman University
  - Adam Blum - Chapman University
  - Michael Hyde - American University

== Honorary Awards ==
- Rob Reiner - Golden Eddie Award
- Neil Travis A.C.E., Paul LaMastra A.C.E. - Career Achievement Award
