= Look, Up in the Sky: The Amazing Story of Superman =

2006 documentary film

Look, Up in the Sky! The Amazing Story of Superman
- DVD cover
- Directed by: Kevin Burns
- Written by: James Grant Golding; Steven Smith
- Produced by: Scott Hartford; Mark McLaughlin; Stacey Zipfel
- Starring: Brandon Routh; Dean Cain; Gerard Christopher
- Narrated by: Kevin Spacey
- Cinematography: Andrés Garretón; Peter Trilling
- Edited by: Kevin Benson; Troy Bogert; David Comtois; John W. Richardson; Molly Shock
- Music by: Todd Erickson; Gerry Moffett
- Production companies: DC Comics; Bad Hat Harry Productions; Prometheus Entertainment
- Distributed by: Warner Home Video; Warner Bros. Television Distribution
- Release date: June 20, 2006
- Running time: 110 minutes
- Country: United States
- Language: English

Look, Up in the Sky! The Amazing Story of Superman is a 2006 American documentary film from executive producers Bryan Singer and Kevin Burns which details the history of the Superman franchise, from comic book, to television, to the big screen. The story of Superman is told through archival footage, as well as interviews with many of the actors, directors, and producers involved with the Superman media over the years. The closing credits feature outtakes from the Christopher Reeve Superman films, including an outtake of Marlon Brando improvising during the recitation of a poem in a scene deleted from the original version of Superman II.

The documentary was released on DVD on June 20, 2006, shortly before the theatrical release of Superman Returns. A two DVD Best Buy exclusive Limited Edition version was released the same day (extra material on the second disc included Bryan Singer's video journals and five official Superman movie poster mini-prints). A shortened version of the documentary was played on A&E on June 12. Finally, the DVD (along with Singer's video journals) was included as part of the 14-disc box set release Superman Ultimate Collector's Edition, in November. In May 2020, the documentary was made available on YouTube on the Warner Bros. Entertainment channel, followed by the DC Comics channel in June.

== Cast ==
Kevin Spacey, who also played Lex Luthor in Superman Returns, narrates the documentary. Bill Mumy and Mark Hamill are also credited as consultants on the documentary. The rest of those appearing are listed below.

Those directly associated with Superman:

- Dean Cain (Clark Kent / Superman - Lois & Clark: The New Adventures of Superman)
- Gerard Christopher (Clark Kent / Superboy - Superboy)
- Jackie Cooper (Perry White - Superman: The Movie, Superman II, Superman III, Superman IV: The Quest for Peace)
- Richard Donner (director of Superman: The Movie and Superman II: The Richard Donner Cut)
- Alfred Gough and Miles Millar (executive producers and creators of Smallville)
- Margot Kidder (Lois Lane - Superman: The Movie, Superman II, Superman III, Superman IV: The Quest for Peace; Bridgette Crosby - Smallville)
- Jack Larson (Jimmy Olsen - Adventures of Superman; Old Jimmy Olsen - Lois & Clark: The New Adventures of Superman; Bo the Bartender, Superman Returns)
- Bill Mumy (Tommy Puck - Superboy)
- Noel Neill (Lois Lane - Adventures of Superman, Superman film serial; Lois Lane's Mother - Superman: The Movie; Gertrude Wanderworth - Superman Returns)
- Annette O'Toole (Lana Lang - Superman III; Martha Kent - Smallville)
- Brandon Routh (Clark Kent / Superman - Superman Returns)
- Ilya Salkind (executive producer of Superman: The Movie, Superman II and Superman III)
- Bryan Singer (director of Superman Returns)
- Lesley Ann Warren (Lois Lane - It's a Bird... It's a Plane... It's Superman)

Those not directly associated with Superman:

- Mark Hamill (did the voice of The Joker in animated incarnations, best known for his role as Luke Skywalker in Star Wars)
- Stan Lee (former editor-in-chief at Marvel Comics, and co-creator of characters such as Spider-Man, Hulk and the X-Men)
- Gene Simmons (musician and comic book fan)
- Adam West (portrayed Bruce Wayne / Batman in Batman)
