= 90210 =

90210 may refer to:

== Television ==
- Beverly Hills, 90210 (franchise), a series of television programs that share common settings
  - Beverly Hills, 90210, the first television series in the franchise that ran between 1990 and 2000
  - 90210 (TV series), the fourth series in the Beverly Hills, 90210 franchise that ran from 2008 to 2013
  - BH90210, a 2019 reboot including the original cast set in a heightened reality

== Music ==
- Soundtrack 90210, a soundtrack album from the 2008 TV series
- "90210" (song), by Travis Scott, 2015
- "90210", a song by Blackbear from Deadroses, 2015
- "90210", a song by Wale from Attention Deficit, 2009
- "90.2.10", a song by Limp Bizkit from Gold Cobra, 2011

== Places ==
- Beverly Hills, California, the main city of ZIP code 90210
  - Beverly Hills Post Office, an adjacent section of Los Angeles that also uses ZIP code 90210
- Peltola, Oulu, Finland (postal code 90210)

== See also ==
- 90,210, a number in the 90,000–99,999 range
- Dr. 90210, a 2004 reality television series
- High Maintenance 90210, a 2007 reality television series
- Transylvania 90210: Songs of Death, Dying, and the Dead, an album by Wednesday 13
