= Behind the Planet of the Apes =

1998 TV Documentary

- Written by: Brian Anthony; David Comtois; Kevin Burns
- Directed by: David Comtois; Kevin Burns
- Narrated by: Roddy Mcdowell
- Country of origin: United States
- Original language: English

Production
- Producers: Shelley Lyons; Brian Anthony
- Cinematography: Cory Geryak
- Editors: David Comtois; Dustin Ebsen; Steve Rasch
- Running time: 126 minutes
- Production companies: Van Ness Films; 20th Century Fox Home Entertainment; Foxstar Productions; American Movie Classics

Original release
- Network: AMC
- Release: September 6, 1998

Behind the Planet of the Apes is a 1998 American television documentary directed by Kevin Burns and David Comtois who also co-wrote it with Brian Anthony and produced by Foxstar Productions. It premiered on AMC on September 6, 1998 as part of their two-day 30th anniversary Planet of the Apes marathon.

== Premise ==
It focuses on the five films in the original Planet of the Apes series, and is hosted and narrated by Roddy McDowall, who played Cornelius in the 1968 film Planet of the Apes and Escape from the Planet of the Apes and his son Caesar in Conquest of the Planet of the Apes and Battle for the Planet of the Apes. The documentary premiered on AMC to commemorate the thirtieth anniversary of the first 1968 film.

The documentary discusses the ideas and works that led to the production of the films and franchise, including two television series, one live action and one animated for children. The documentary begins with the original novel written by author Pierre Boulle and how it caught the interest of producer Arthur P. Jacobs, who brought it to 20th Century Fox. The development and production of each film is discussed, including casting, costume design, filming locations and behind the scenes footage.

== Release ==
The documentary was included in the 2001 DVD box set of the classic films. It was later included as part of the bonus features on the 2008 Blu-ray release of the original film, with interactivity features added and an original promo for the documentary.
