= Kevin Burns =

American television and film producer (1955–2020)

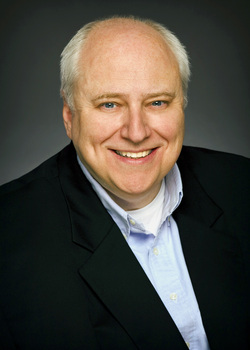
- Burns in 2013
- Born: June 18, 1955; Schenectady, New York, U.S.
- Died: September 27, 2020 (aged 65); Los Angeles, California, U.S.
- Education: Hamilton College; Boston University
- Occupations: Producer, director, screenwriter
- Years active: 1981–2020

Kevin Burns (June 18, 1955 – September 27, 2020) was an American television and film producer, director, and screenwriter. His work can be seen on A&E, National Geographic Channel, E!, Animal Planet, AMC, Bravo, WE tv, Travel Channel, Lifetime, and The History Channel. Burns created and executive-produced more than 800 hours of television programming.

== Biography ==
=== Early life ===
Born on June 18, 1955, Burns grew up in Niskayuna, New York. Raised Roman Catholic, he graduated from St. Helen’s School before attending Niskayuna High School. In 1977, he graduated cum laude from Hamilton College. In 1981, he received both a master's degree in film from Boston University's College of Communication and a Student Academy Award from The Academy of Motion Picture Arts and Sciences for his first film, I Remember Barbra, a humorous documentary short that profiled Barbra Streisand's impact on her former Brooklyn, New York neighborhood. After graduation, Burns taught film production at the university, as well as heading the school's Film Unit, a group that allowed students to gain real-world experience by producing commercials, public service announcements, documentaries, and other projects for clients. In 1988, he moved to Los Angeles, where he began working as an executive at 20th Century Fox Television.

=== Career ===
While at Fox, Burns co-founded Foxstar Productions, the production unit responsible for creating a series of Alien Nation movies for television. In 1994, while serving as senior vice-president of Foxstar, he founded Van Ness Films, a non-fiction and documentary production unit. That same year, he met Jon Jashni, a Fox film executive who shared his interest in the works of legendary Hollywood producer Irwin Allen.

In 1999, Burns officially made a transition from his role as a studio executive to that of a full-time producer. While still under a production deal at Fox Television Studios, Burns and Jon Jashni formed Synthesis Entertainment and began developing and producing remakes and sequels of the Allen properties, most notably a Fox Television pilot for an updated version of The Time Tunnel (2002) and the feature film versions of Poseidon (2006) and Voyage to the Bottom of the Sea.

In 1999, Burns also created Prometheus Entertainment, a company specializing in documentary, reality, and non-fiction programming and specials. Here, Burns continued to produce and direct a wide variety of programming, including the reality show The Girls Next Door on E! (about the adventures of Playboy founder Hugh Hefner's three live-in girlfriends), High Maintenance 90210, Hollywood Science for the National Geographic Channel, Food Paradise and Bridget's Sexiest Beaches (both for the Travel Channel) along with Kendra and Holly's World, both spin-offs of The Girls Next Door.

In 2002, Burns received his first of two Emmy Awards as executive producer for A&E's Biography series. That same year, he was selected by George Lucas and Lucasfilm to produce and direct the 150-minute documentary feature Empire of Dreams: The Story of the Star Wars Trilogy. Four years later, he was again selected by Lucas to produce and direct Star Wars: The Legacy Revealed, a feature-length documentary that premiered on The History Channel and went on to earn three Emmy Award nominations. Other specials include Look, Up in the Sky: The Amazing Story of Superman, which Burns co-produced with Superman Returns director Bryan Singer; Spider-Man Tech; Indiana Jones and the Ultimate Quest; Batman Unmasked; Batman Tech; The Valkyrie Legacy, his second co-production with Bryan Singer; and Angels & Demons: Decoded in 2009.

Since 2010, Burns and his company Prometheus Entertainment have produced The History Channel TV series Ancient Aliens, America's Book of Secrets, and The Curse of Oak Island, as well as the reality TV series Kendra on Top for WEtv, and other non-fiction series and specials.

Along with his business partner Jon Jashni, Burns played an integral part in the development and creation of the Lost in Space reboot for Netflix and was serving as executive producer on the show.

=== Death ===
Burns died on September 27, 2020, of cardiac arrest at Cedars-Sinai Medical Center in Los Angeles, California.

== Awards and nominations ==
Primetime Emmy Awards

- Nominated: Outstanding Cultural Music-Dance Program, Rodgers & Hammerstein: The Sound of Movies (1996)
- Won: Outstanding Non-Fiction Series (Informational), Biography (2002)
- Nominated: Outstanding Nonfiction Series, Biography (TV Series) (2006)
- Nominated: Outstanding Writing for Nonfiction Programming, Star Wars: The Legacy Revealed (2007)
- Nominated: Outstanding Nonfiction Special, Star Wars: The Legacy Revealed (2007)
- Nominated: Outstanding Nonfiction Series, Biography (TV Series) (2007)
- Nominated: Outstanding Directing for Nonfiction Programming, Star Wars: The Legacy Revealed (2007)

Daytime Emmy Awards

- Won: Outstanding Special Class Special, Hollywood Rocks the Movies: The 1970s (2003)

DVD Exclusive Awards

- Nominated: Best New, Enhanced or Reconstructed Movie Scenes, Marilyn Monroe: The Final Days (2001)
- Won: Best Original Retrospective Documentary, *Cleopatra: The Film That Changed Hollywood (2001)
- Won: Best Behind the Scenes Program (New for DVD), Empire of Dreams: The Story of the Star Wars Trilogy (2005)

International Monitor Awards

- Won: Documentaries – Director, Hollywood Aliens & Monsters (1998)

Student Academy Awards, US

- Won: Documentary, I Remember Barbra (1981)

== Filmography ==
| Film | Year | Credited as | | | Notes |
| Film | Year | Director | Producer | Writer | Notes |
|---|---|---|---|---|---|
| I Remember Barbra | 1981 | Yes | Yes | No | |
| In Our Hands | 1982 | No | Yes | No | |
| Meet Bertice | 1993 | No | Yes | No | |
| Alien Nation: Dark Horizon | 1994 | No | Yes | No | uncredited |
| Biography | 1995-2005 | Yes | Yes | Yes | director 1995-1997 writer 1996-1997 |
| The Fantasy Worlds of Irwin Allen | 1995 | Yes | Yes | Yes | |
| Alien Nation: Body and Soul | 1995 | No | Yes | No | uncredited |
| A Hollywood Christmas | 1996 | Yes | Yes | Yes | |
| Alien Nation: Millennium | 1996 | No | Yes | No | |
| Rodgers & Hammerstein: The Sound of Movies | 1996 | Yes | Yes | No | |
| Monster Mania | 1997 | Yes | Yes | No | |
| Hidden Hollywood: Treasures from the 20th Century Fox Film Vaults | 1997 | No | Yes | No | |
| Hidden Hollywood II: More Treasures from the 20th Century Fox Vaults | 1997 | Yes | Yes | No | |
| Twentieth Century-Fox: The First 50 Years | 1997 | Yes | Yes | Yes | |
| Hollywood Aliens & Monsters | 1997 | Yes | No | No | |
| Small Steps, Big Strides: The Black Experience in Hollywood | 1998 | No | Yes | No | |
| Beyond Titanic | 1998 | No | Yes | No | |
| Behind the Planet of the Apes | 1998 | Yes | Yes | Yes | |
| Lost in Space Forever | 1998 | Yes | Yes | Yes | |
| Hugh Hefner: American Playboy Revisited | 1998 | Yes | No | No | |
| TV Guide Looks at Cops | 1998 | Yes | No | No | |
| TV Guide Looks at Christmas | 1998 | Yes | No | No | |
| Famous Families | 1998 | No | Yes | No | 17 episodes |
| The Bunny Years | 1999 | No | Yes | No | |
| Who Knew? | 1999 | No | Yes | No | |
| Bride of Monster Mania | 1999 | No | Yes | No | |
| Attack of the 50 Foot Monster Mania | 1999 | No | Yes | No | |
| Hollywood's Hot Wheels | 1999 | No | Yes | No | |
| Hollywood Screen Tests | 1999 | No | Yes | No | |
| Hollywood Screen Tests: Take 2 | 1999 | No | Yes | No | |
| Hollywood at Your Feet: The Story of the Chinese Theatre Footprints | 2000 | No | Yes | No | |
| The Fly Papers: The Buzz on Hollywood's Scariest Insect | 2000 | No | Yes | No | |
| Twentieth Century Fox: The Blockbuster Years | 2000 | Yes | Yes | Yes | |
| Hollywood Rocks the Movies: The Early Years | 2000 | Yes | Yes | No | |
| Backstory | 2000 | No | Yes | Yes | producer 55 episodes writer 2 episodes |
| Cleopatra: The Film That Changed Hollywood | 2001 | Yes | Yes | Yes | |
| Marilyn Monroe: The Final Days | 2001 | No | Yes | No | |
| The Omen Legacy | 2001 | No | Yes | No | |
| History vs. Hollywood | 2001 | No | Yes | No | 16 episodes |
| The Time Tunnel | 2002 | No | Yes | No | |
| Inside The Playboy Mansion | 2002 | Yes | Yes | Yes | |
| Hollywood Rocks the Movies: The 1970s | 2002 | No | Yes | No | |
| The Alien Saga | 2002 | No | Yes | No | |
| Monsterama | 2003 | No | Yes | No | 24episodes |
| Hell Up in Hollywood: Soul Cinema and the 1970s | 2003 | No | Yes | No | |
| 50 Greatest TV Animals | 2003 | No | Yes | No | |
| Halloween: A Cut Above the Rest | 2003 | No | Yes | No | |
| Sex at 24 Frames Per Second: The Ultimate Journey Through Sex in Cinema | 2003 | No | Yes | No | |
| Playboy's 50th Anniversary Celebration | 2003 | No | Yes | No | |
| Monsterama: Munsters Collectibles | 2003 | No | No | Yes | |
| Monsterama: Aurora Model Kits | 2003 | No | No | Yes | |
| The Robinsons: Lost in Space | 2004 | No | Yes | No | |
| Just the Facts | 2004 | No | Yes | Yes | |
| 50 Greatest Movie Animals | 2004 | No | Yes | No | |
| Love Hollywood Style | 2004 | No | Yes | No | |
| Animal Icons | 2004 | No | Yes | No | 17 episodes |
| Empire of Dreams: The Story of the Star Wars Trilogy | 2004 | Yes | Yes | No | |
| Ultimate Super Heroes | 2005 | No | Yes | No | |
| Ultimate Super Villains | 2005 | No | Yes | No | |
| Ultimate Super Vixens | 2005 | No | Yes | No | |
| The Girls Next Door | 2005-2009 | No | Yes | No | |
| Poseidon | 2006 | No | Yes | No | |
| Look, Up in the Sky! The Amazing Story of Superman | 2006 | Yes | Yes | No | |
| The Science of Superman | 2006 | No | Yes | No | |
| Hollywood Science | 2006 | No | Yes | No | 5 episodes |
| High Maintenance 90210 | 2007 | No | Yes | No | 6 episodes |
| Spider-Man Tech | 2007 | No | Yes | No | |
| Star Wars Tech | 2007 | No | Yes | No | |
| Star Warriors | 2007 | Yes | Yes | No | |
| Star Wars: The Legacy Revealed | 2007 | Yes | Yes | Yes | |
| Food Paradise | 2007-2013 | No | Yes | No | 52 episodes |
| Indiana Jones and the Ultimate Quest | 2008 | Yes | Yes | No | |
| Batman Unmasked | 2008 | No | Yes | No | |
| Batman Tech | 2008 | No | Yes | No | |
| Vegas Revolution | 2008 | No | Yes | No | 6 episodes |
| The Valkyrie Legacy | 2008 | Yes | Yes | No | |
| Kendra | 2008-2011 | No | Yes | No | |
| Ladies or Gentlemen | 2008 | Yes | Yes | No | |
| The Face is Familiar | 2009 | Yes | Yes | No | |
| Angels & Demons: Decoded | 2009 | No | Yes | No | |
| Bridget's Sexiest Beaches | 2009 | No | Yes | No | |
| Holly's World | 2009-2011 | No | Yes | No | 19 episodes |
| The President's Book of Secrets | 2010 | No | Yes | No | |
| Ancient Aliens | 2010-2020 | No | Yes | No | |
| Hef's Runaway Bride | 2011 | No | Yes | No | |
| Civilization: Lost | 2011 | No | Yes | No | |
| How Playboy Changed the World | 2012 | Yes | Yes | No | |
| The Godfather Legacy | 2012 | Yes | Yes | No | |
| America's Book of Secrets | 2012-2013 | No | Yes | No | 33 episodes |
| Birth/Mothers | 2012 | No | Yes | No | |
| Kendra on Top | 2012-2017 | No | Yes | No | |
| Bible Secrets Revealed | 2013-2014 | No | Yes | No | 6 episodes |
| Target: Earth | 2013 | No | Yes | No | |
| Secret Societies of Hollywood | 2013 | No | Yes | No | 5 episodes |
| In Search of Aliens | 2013 | No | Yes | No | 10 episodes |
| The Curse of Oak Island | 2014-2020 | No | Yes | No | |
| Cesar Millan: Love My Pit Bull | 2014 | No | Yes | No | |
| Blood and Glory: The Civil War in Color | 2015 | No | Yes | No | |
| The Secret Life of: America's Tallest Buildings | 2017 | No | Yes | No | |
| Vanished | 2017 | No | Yes | No | |
| The Tesla Files | 2018 | No | Yes | No | |
| The Curse of Civil War Gold | 2018 | No | Yes | No | |
| Lost in Space | 2018 | No | Yes | No | |
