= Olinto M. Barsanti =

United States Army general (1917–1973)

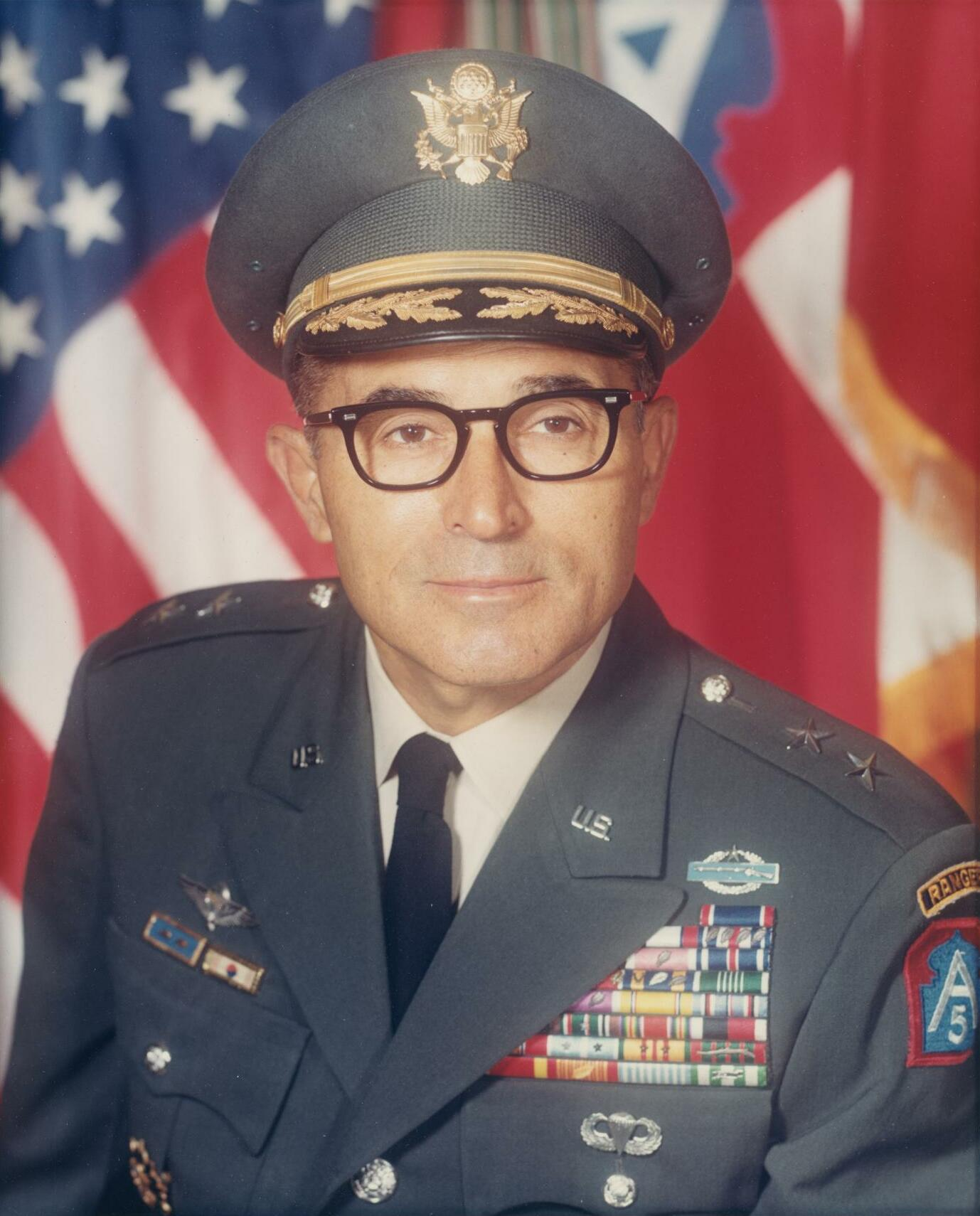
- Born: November 11, 1917; Nevada, US
- Died: May 2, 1973 (aged 55)
- Burial place: Arlington National Cemetery
- Military career
- Branch: United States Army
- Service years: 1938–1971
- Rank: Major General
- Commands: 101st Airborne Division; 9th Infantry Regiment
- Conflicts: World War II; Korean War; Cold War; Vietnam War
- Awards: Army Distinguished Service Cross; Army Distinguished Service Medal; Silver Star (5); Legion of Merit (2); Bronze Star Medal (8) with "V"; Air Medal (7) with "V"; Purple Heart (7); Croix de Guerre with palms

Olinto Mark Barsanti (November 11, 1917 – May 2, 1973) was commander of the 101st Airborne Division in Vietnam from 1967 to 1968, commanding during the Tet Offensive and during subsequent operations around Bien Hoa and Huế. He commanded the 3rd Battalion, 38th Infantry Regiment, 2nd Infantry Division during World War II (in Normandy, Brittany, and Belgium). He served in the Korean War from the beginning of the conflict in July 1950 until August 1951. During his tour in Korea his assignments included staff officer with X Corps and commander of the 9th Infantry Regiment, 2nd Infantry Division. He is one of the most highly decorated American soldiers in history, receiving approximately 60 decorations, including the DSC, DSM, 5 Silver Stars, 2 Legions of Merit, 8 Bronze Stars, 7 Air Medals, 7 Purple Hearts, and the French Croix de guerre (WWII) with bronze palm.

Barsanti died of stomach cancer in 1973. He is buried at Arlington National Cemetery.

== World War II ==
In 1944, Barsanti arrived on the coast of France, the day after D-Day, as commander of the 3rd Battalion, 38th Infantry Regiment. At 26 years old, he was one of the youngest battalion commanders in the Army. During his eight months serving in the war, Barsanti was awarded five Purple Hearts and four Bronze Star Medals. Barsanti personally assisted each of his regiments during a successful defense against a German counter-attack, and helped take a German stronghold. These two acts earned him two Silver Star Medals.

During the Battle of Elsenborn Ridge his unit, part of the 2nd Infantry Division, defended the twin villages of Rocherath-Krinkelt.

== Korean War ==
In June 1950, two days after North Korea invaded South Korea, Barsanti and a few other officers arrived to establish a command post for General of the Army Douglas MacArthur in Suwon, South Korea. His efforts in setting up facilities, transportation, and necessary systems, unassisted except for indigenous personnel, earned him a Legion of Merit. He went on to command the 9th Infantry Regiment during the Korean War, and was the youngest Regimental Commander in Korea at the age of 33. His successful completion of a lone mission to deliver secret orders to two South Korean infantry divisions 190 miles behind enemy lines earned him a Distinguished Service Cross.

== Vietnam War ==
In 1967, Barsanti was assigned command of the 101st Airborne Division which was stationed at Fort Campbell, Kentucky. His orders were to prepare the division for combat in South Vietnam. In August 1967, Barsanti received orders to prepare for Operation Eagle Thrust, the largest air-flight transfer of men and equipment from the U.S. to Southeast Asia. Barsanti arrived in Vietnam on December 13, 1967, to report for duty. During Barsanti's seven months commanding the 101st Airborne in Vietnam, the unit had over 8,000 enemy kills, more than 350 detainees taken, and more than 2,650 weapons captured.

== Chronological List of Assignments ==
Jul 1940 – Sep 1940	The Infantry School, Fort Benning, Georgia
Oct 1940 – Nov 1942	38th Infantry, Fort Sam Houston, Texas
Dec 1942 – Apr 1943	The Infantry School, Fort Benning, Georgia
May 1945 – Jan 1946	38th Infantry, Camp McCoy, Wisconsin
Oct 1943 – Apr 1945	Commanding Officer, 3d Battalion, 38th Infantry, ETO, Europe
May 1945 – Oct 1945	S-3, 25th Special Troops, Camp Gruber, Oklahoma
Nov 1945 – Jan 1946	Commanding Officer, 3d Battalion, 38th Infantry, Camp Swift, Texas
Feb 1946 – May 1946	Student, Command and General Staff College, Fort Leavenworth, Kansas
June 1946 – Jul 1946	Executive Officer, 38th Infantry Regiment, Camp Carson, Colorado
Jul 1946 – Jul 1949	Faculty Member, Command and General Staff College, Fort Leavenworth, Kansas
Sep 1949 – May 1950	Staff Officer, G-1, General, Far East Command, Tokyo, Japan
Jun 1950 – Jul 1950	Assistant Chief of Staff, G-1, General Headquarters, ADCOM, Korea
Aug 1950 – Feb 1951	Assistant G-1, X Corps, Korea
Mar 1951 – Aug 1951	Executive Officer and Commanding Officer, 9th Infantry Regiment, Korea
Sep 1951 – Dec 1951	Operation and Training Officer, G-3, General Headquarters, Far East Command
Jan 1952 – Jun 1953	Assistant Chief of Staff, G-3, VI Corps, Camp Atterbury, Indiana
Jul 1953 – Jan 1954	Student, Armed Forces Staff College, Norfolk, Virginia
Feb 1954 – May 1955	Chief, Survey and Organization Branch, Comptroller, US Army, Europe
Jun 1955 – Jan 1957	Chief of Staff, Berlin Command
Feb 1957 – Jul 1957	Member, Regular Officer Augmentation Detachment Department of the Army, Washington, D.C.
Aug 1957 – Jun 1958	Student, National War College, Washington, D.C.
Jul 1958 – Jun 1961	Chief, Requirements Division, Deputy Chief of Staff for Personnel, Department of the Army, Washington, D.C.
Jul 1961 – Jul 1963	Chief, Manpower Division, JI, Joint Staff Joint Chiefs of Staff, Washington, D.C.
Jul 1963 – Aug 1964	Assistant Division Commander for Combat Operations, 7th Infantry Division, Korea
Sep 1964 – May 1966	Comptroller, US Army, Europe
May 1966 – Sep 1966	Chief of Staff, V Corps, USAREUR
Oct 1966 – Jun 1967	Comptroller and Director of Programs, US Army Materiel Command, Washington, D.C.
Jul 1967 – Jun 1968	Commanding General, 101st Airborne Division, Fort Campbell, Kentucky (deployed to Vietnam Dec 13, 67)
Jul 1968 – Aug 1968	Commanding General, 101st Air Cavalry Division
Aug 1968 – Sep 1971	Chief of Staff, Fifth US Army, Fort Sheridan, Illinois

== Awards and decorations ==
Combat Infantryman Badge with star
Ranger Tab
Basic Parachutist Badge
Army Staff Identification Badge
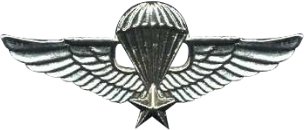
Vietnam Master Parachutist Badge
101st Airborne Division Shoulder Sleeve Insignia
7 Overseas Service Bars

Army Distinguished Service Cross
Army Distinguished Service Medal
Silver Star with four bronze oak leaf clusters
Legion of Merit with oak leaf cluster
Distinguished Flying Cross
Bronze Star Medal with Valor device and seven oak leaf clusters
Purple Heart with six oak leaf clusters
Air Medal with Valor device and six oak leaf clusters
Army Commendation Medal
Army Presidential Unit Citation with two oak leaf clusters
American Defense Service Medal
American Campaign Medal
European–African–Middle Eastern Campaign Medal with one silver service star
World War II Victory Medal
Army of Occupation Medal
National Defense Service Medal with service star
Korean Service Medal with six service stars
Vietnam Service Medal with two service stars
French WWII War Cross with bronze palm
National Order of Vietnam, Knight
Vietnam Gallantry Cross with palm
Republic of Korea Presidential Unit Citation
Vietnam Gallantry Cross Unit Citation
Vietnam Civil Actions Medal Unit Citation
United Nations Korea Medal
Vietnam Campaign Medal

== Honors ==
In his memory, the University of North Texas established the Barsanti Military History Center. The current director of the Barsanti program is Geoffrey Wawro.

Fort Campbell held a dedication ceremony for the Olinto M. Barsanti Elementary School, a Department of the Defense Education Activity school. The new school is located in the southern portion of the Fort Campbell Army Post. The 93,000 square-foot, $18 million building was built to accommodate the growing availability of on-post-housing, and serves the Gardner Hills and The Woodlands housing areas. It opened its doors to approximately 550 Pre-K through 5th grade students on January 3, 2011.

Military offices
Preceded by	Chief of Staff 5th US Army; August 1968 – June 1971	Succeeded by
Preceded by Ben Sternberg	Commanding General of the 101st Airborne Division; June 1967 – June 1968	Succeeded by Melvin Zais
Preceded by	Comptroller US Army Europe; September 1964 – May 1966	Succeeded by
