= Robert Clotworthy =

American voice actor

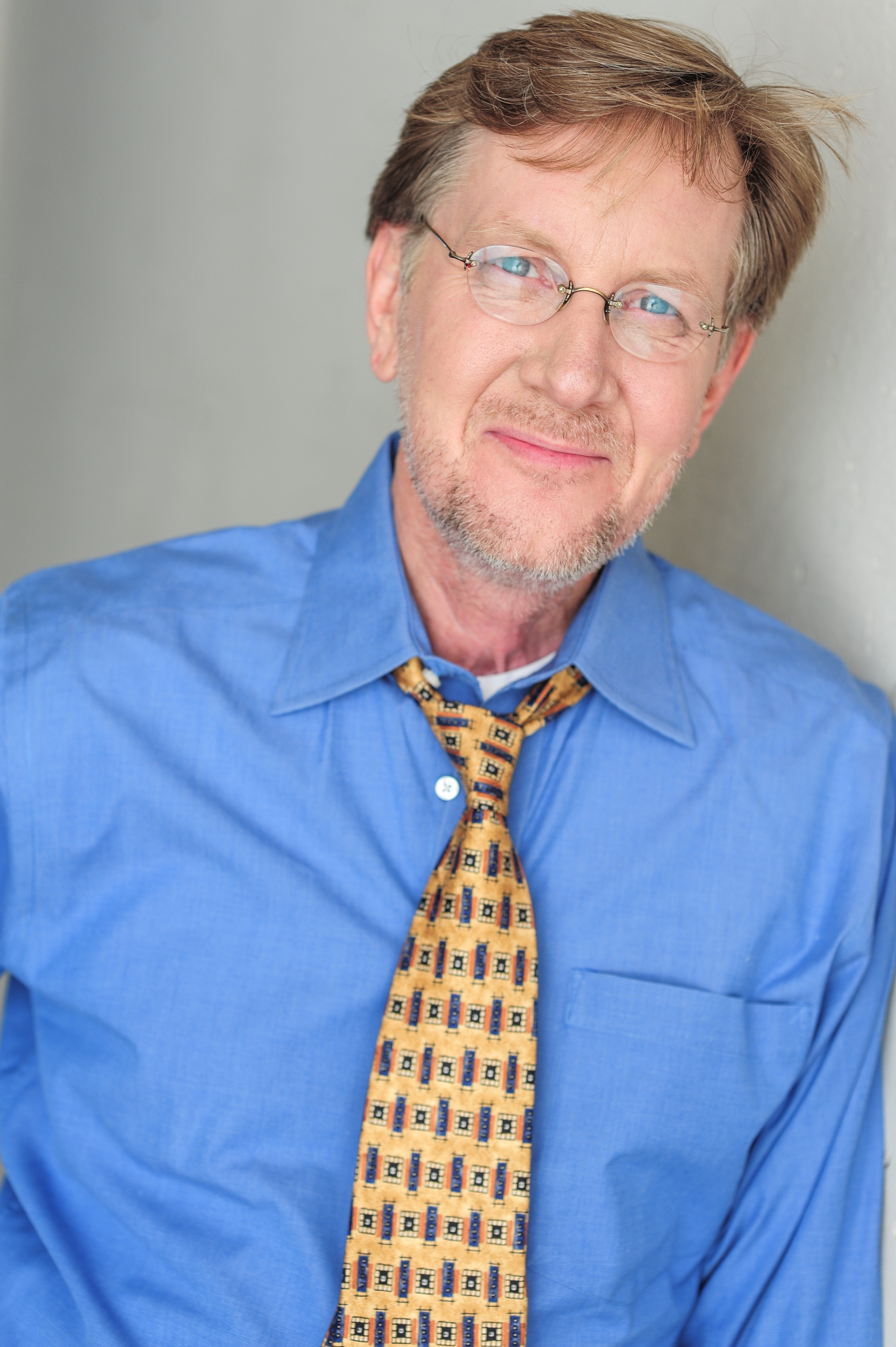
- Clotworthy in 2010
- Occupations: Narrator; voice actor
- Years active: 1973–present
- Website: www.robertclotworthy.com

Voice sample by Robert Clotworthy
A short voice sample from Robert Clotworthy.

Robert Clotworthy is an American voice actor and narrator. He is best known as the narrator for the History Channel series Ancient Aliens and The Curse of Oak Island and his role as the voice of Jim Raynor in the StarCraft video game series.

== Career ==
=== Early career ===
Clotworthy's career as a voice actor began when he was fifteen. In an interview, he stated, "My father was a producer of radio commercials and from an early age I would accompany him to recording sessions. I met some of the finest voice talent (Jerry Stiller, Anne Meara, Mel Blanc, June Foray etc.) and they inspired me."

=== Role as Jim Raynor ===
Clotworthy starred as the voice of Jim Raynor in the StarCraft series of real-time strategy video games. He first appeared as Raynor in StarCraft, and reprised his role in the expansion StarCraft: Brood War. A reader's poll for GameSpot voted Raynor one of video gaming's top ten heroes, with GameSpot giving specific praise to Clotworthy's voice acting.

Twelve years after the release of StarCraft, Clotworthy reprised his role as Raynor in StarCraft II: Wings of Liberty. The storyline of Wings of Liberty focuses primarily on the Terrans and Raynor in particular, with Raynor taking the role of main character. A review of Wings of Liberty on ITP.net stated that Raynor was "voiced to perfection" by Clotworthy and he was selected as the winner of "GotY Awards 2010 – Best Voice Acting" by reactiontime.co.uk. He returned to the role with the expansions StarCraft II: Heart of the Swarm and StarCraft II: Legacy of the Void, as well as Blizzard's crossover video game Heroes of the Storm.

=== Other roles ===
Clotworthy has worked in over 100 feature films and television programs. He appeared as "Forensic Technician" in four episodes of the 1980s US TV series Hunter. He was the narrator on the Emmy nominated documentaries Empire of Dreams: The Making of the Star Wars Trilogy and Star Wars: The Legacy Revealed. He worked on The Lego Movie Videogame. He also narrated Indiana Jones and the Ultimate Quest and Batman Unmasked: The Psychology of the Dark Knight. Clotworthy has guest starred on The Big Bang Theory, Two and a Half Men, and China, IL. In 2014, he voiced the Espheni (referred to as "The Monk") in the TNT series Falling Skies, and made an on-screen appearance in American Sniper as a Veteran Affairs doctor who consults with Chris Kyle. He also voiced the Black Knight/Zelgius and Finn in Nintendo's mobile game Fire Emblem Heroes.

== Filmography ==
=== Film ===
Year	Title	Role	Notes
1985	Doin' Time	Attorney	
1986	The Check is in the Mail...	Moonie	
1987	Who's That Girl	Lawyer	
1987	He's My Girl	Jeffrey	
1988	Brothers in Arms	2nd Hunter	
1991	Switch	Bailiff	
1991	V.I. Warshawski	Philip Pugh	
1991	Going Under	Submarine (voice)	
1991	And You Thought Your Parents Were Weird	Mike Abbott	
1991	For the Boys	Navy Commander, Japan	
1992	Love Field	Announcer (voice)	
1993	Patlabor 2: The Movie	Yukihito Tsuge (voice)	English dub
1993	Hold Please	Richard Grail	Short
1995	Phoenix	Man #1	
1996	Vampirella	Professor Steinman	
1998	Mulan	Tai Zhencha (voice)	
1999	The Deep End of the Ocean	Reporter	
1999	The Iron Giant	Joe (voice)	
2000	The Emperor's New Groove	Guards (voice)	Credited as Rob Clotworthy
2001	Ablaze	Dispatcher Harris	
2001	Shrek	Lord Farquaad's Guards (voice)	
2002	One Hour Photo	Eye Surgeon	
2002	Gale Force	Bill Cassidy	
2003	Spirit: Stallion of the Cimarron	Colonel's Soldiers	
2005	Racing Stripes	Horse 2 (voice)	
2005	Tugger: The Jeep 4x4 Who Wanted to Fly	Fatty, USAF Pilot (voice)	
2005	Crash Landing	Jimmy Watkins	
2006	Inside	Dr. Nance	
2006	Pulse	Calvin	
2007	Rendition	Reception Guest	
2008	Kung Fu Panda	Anvil of Heaven (voice)	
2009	Monsters vs Aliens	Soldiers (voice)	
2010	Buried	CRT Spokesman (voice)	
2010	My Soul to Take	News Anchor (voice)	
2011	The Green Hornet	Politician	
2011	From Up on Poppy Hill	Umi's father (voice)	English dub
2012	Chronicle	Newscaster	
2014	Captain America: The Winter Soldier	Nick Fury's Car (voice)	
2014	Paradise	Man (voice)	Short
2014	American Sniper	VA Doctor	
2016	Captain America: Civil War	Newscaster (voice)	Uncredited
2016	X-Men: Apocalypse	Newscaster (voice)	Uncredited
2017	The New Adventures of Max	Higgabottom (voice)	
2018	The Incredibles 2	Tommy (voice)	
2019	Charlie's Angels	Charlie Townsend (voice)	
2021	Red Notice	Opening Narrator (voice)	

=== Television ===
Year	Title	Role	Notes
1973	Emergency!	Hamburger-Eating Teen	Episode: "Inheritance Tax"; Uncredited
1974	The Waltons	Tyler Crofut	Credited as Rob Clotworhy; Episode: "The Graduation"
1974	Columbo	Boodle Boy / Jonathan B. Miller	Episode: "By Dawn's Early Light"
1974	Police Woman	The Gas Jockey	Credited as Rob Clotworthy; Episode: "Shoefly"
1975	ABC Afterschool Special	Clete	Episode: "The Skating Rink"
1976	The Cheerleaders	BJ's Boyfriend	Television Film
1976	Black Sheep Squadron	Lt. Wyatt	Credited as Rob Clotworthy; Episode: "Prisoners of War"
1977	Police Story	Corvette Driver	Credited as Rob Clotworthy; Episode: "Stigma"
1978	The Rockford Files	Tommy	Episode: "South by Southeast"
1978	M*A*S*H	Private Welch	Episode: "Dear Comrade"
1979	Billy	Gary	Episode: "Fathers and Sons"
1980	Stone	The Runner	Episode: "Death Run"
1981	Death of a Centerfold: The Dorothy Stratten Story	Floyd	Television Film
1981	Dynasty	Ty Meredith	Episode: "The Verdict"
1982	Star of the Family	Bigelow	Episode: "Pilot"
1983	Ghost Dancing	Water Deliveryman	Television Film
1983	Whiz Kids	Arbus	Episode: "Candidate for Murder"
1984	Three's Company	Tony Williams / Tony	2 episodes
1984	Shattered Vows	Mark	Television film
1984	Sweet Revenge	Cashier	Television film; uncredited
1984	Fatal Vision	MP Sergeant	Miniseries; 2 episodes
1985	Remington Steele	Paul Stuban	Episode: "Illustrated Steele"
1985	George Burns Comedy Week	Actor	Episode: "The Dynamite Girl"
1985	The New Leave It to Beaver	Mr. Newhouse	Episode: "Wow"
1986	The Colbys	Attorney	Episode: "The Trial"; Uncredited
1986	Outlaws	Mr. Harrison	Episode: "Outlaws"
1986–1987	Falcon Crest	Mark	2 episodes
1987	Dennis the Menace	Tom	Television film
1988	1st & Ten	Marshall	Episode: "The Inmates Buy the Asylum"
1989	Hunter	Kevin	4 episodes
1990	Matlock	Prosecutor in Los Angeles	Episode: "Nowhere to Turn"
1990	Father Dowling Mysteries	Olsen	Episode: "The Showgirl Mystery"
1990	Who's the Boss?	Greg	Episode: "Parental Guidance Suggested"
1991	True Colors	Danforth	2 episodes
1991	Murphy Brown	Allen	Episode: "Hoarse Play"
1992	Tequila and Bonetti	Lloyd	Episode: "A Perfect Match"
1992	Herman's Head	Frank	Episode: "Stop Me Before I Help Again"
1993	Doogie Howser, M.D.	Dr. Bob Whitman	Episode: "The Adventures of Sherlock Holmes"
1993	Batman: The Animated Series	Billy (voice)	Episode: "Mudslide"; credited as Bob Clotworthy
1994	Boy Meets World	TV Voice	Episode: "The B-Team of Life"
1995–2006	The Young and the Restless	Judge Russell Jennings / Greg Hillman	43 Episodes
1996	Murphy Brown	Dole Operative	Episode: "The Bus Stops Here"
1996	Crime of the Century	Reporter	Television Film
1996	Melrose Place	Auctioneer	Episode: "Crazy Love"
1997	Get to the Heart: The Barbara Mandrell Story	Dr. Newton Louvern	Television Film
1998	The New Batman Adventures	Pilot (voice)	Episode: "The Ultimate Thrill"
1999	The Practice	Medical Expert	Episode: "Oz"
1999	The Hand Behind the Mouse: The Ub Iwerks Story	Ub Iwerks (voice)	Documentary
2000	JAG	Jim Wythrip	Episode: "The Witches of Gulfport"
2000	The Drew Carey Show	INS Inspector	Episode: "Drew and the Trail Scouts"
2001	The West Wing	Tom	Episode: "The Drop In"
2001	Mahô shôjo neko Taruto	Rakugan (voice)	English dub
2001	Raptor	Doctor	Television film
2003	Boston Public	Radio Host	Episode: "Chapter Fifty-Nine"
2003	Miracles	Steve Jones	Episode: "Hand of God"
2003	The Practice	Judge Tyler Flynn	Episode: "Cause of Action"
2004	Phil of the Future	Dr. Gennaro	Episode: "Daddy Dearest"
2004	NYPD Blue	Roger	Episode: "Bale Out"
2004	Empire of Dreams: The Story of the Star Wars Trilogy	Narrator	Documentary
2005	Hercules	Narrator	2 episodes
2005–2010	Medium	News Reporter / Ripley's Believe It or Not Announcer / Bradley Campaign Ad Announcer	3 episodes; uncredited
2006	That '70s Show	Customer	Episode: "My Fairy King"
2006	Criminal Minds	Don Norvell	Episode: "Aftermath"
2006	The Water is Wide	Narrator	Television film
2006–2012	Two and a Half Men	Gangster #1 / Pilot / TV Commercial Announcer / TV Commercial Narrator / TV Announcer	11 episodes
2007	The Riches	Clay Wilkes	Episode: "Believe the Lie"
2007	Boston Legal	Zachary West	Episode: "Beauty and the Beast"
2007	Bone Eater	Jimmy Winger	Television film
2007	Judy's Got a Gun	Roger Yeager	Television film
2007	Real Premonitions	Narrator	Documentary
2007	Star Wars: The Legacy Revealed	Narrator	Documentary
2007–2008	Days of Our Lives	Dean Randall Lochlan	3 episodes
2008	The Batman	Arkham Asylum Warden (voice)	Episode: "What Goes Up..."; credited as Bob Clotworthy
2008	Indiana Jones and the Ultimate Quest	Narrator	Documentary
2008	Batman Unmasked	Narrator	Documentary
2008	Valkyrie: The Plot to Kill Hitler	Narrator	Documentary
2008–2015	The Big Bang Theory	Astronaut, Announcer, Dave Roeger, Headmaster Edwards, Train Conductor	Recurring role
2009–2020	Ancient Aliens	Narrator	190 episodes
2010	Sonny with a Chance	Dr. Spector	Episode: "Walk a Mile in My Pants"
2010	Batman: Under the Red Hood	Leo / Thug	Television film
2010	All My Children	Minister	Episode: "#1.10431"
2011	Big Love	Elder Mccrackle	Episode: "The Special Relationship"
2011	The Defenders	Bennett Perkins	Episode: "Nevada v. Hunter"
2011	Eagleheart	Stan	Episode: "Chris, Susie, Brett and Malice"
2011	The Mentalist	Pulaski	Episode: "Blood for Blood"
2012	The Mentalist	Rudolph Pulaski	Episode: "At First Blush"
2012	Diagnosis: Dead or Alive	Kurt	Episode: "Jamie & David"
2013	Broken Quest	Adventure Master	Episode: "The Adventure Master"
2013	China, IL	Carabas, Kevin Costner (voice)	2 episodes
2014	Falling Skies	The Monk	3 episodes
2014	Sinkholes: Swallowed Alive	Narrator	Documentary
2014	Cesar Millan: Love My Pit Bull	Narrator	Documentary
2014	We the Economy: 20 Short Films You Can't Afford to Miss	Narrator	Documentary
2014–present	The Curse of Oak Island	Narrator	111 episodes
2015	Beautiful & Twisted	Senior Bank Manager	Television film
2015	Switched at Birth	Professor Epstein	Episode: "The Player's Choice"
2015	Blood and Glory: The Civil War in Color	Narrator	Miniseries
2016	Better Call Saul	Spokesperson - Davis & Main TV Commercial	2 episodes
2016	Ultimate Spider-Man	Captain George Stacy (voice)	Episode: "Return to the Spider-Verse"
2017	We Bare Bears	Warren (voice)	Episode: "Neighbors"
2017	Groomzilla	Ed Rydell	Television film
2018–2019	The Curse of Civil War Gold	Narrator	16 episodes
2019	Vanished	Narrator	Television film
2019	Young Sheldon	Mayor Harrison	Episode: "A Political Campaign and a Candy Land Cheater"
2020	Homeland	Judge	Episode: "The English Teacher"
2020–present	The Secret of Skinwalker Ranch	Narrator	44 episodes
2023	Pluto	Johannsen (voice)	English dub; 2 episodes

=== Video games ===
Year	Title	Role	Notes
1998	StarCraft	Jim Raynor	
1998	StarCraft: Brood War	Jim Raynor	
2004	EverQuest II	Generic Male Erudite Merchant, Generic Male Dark Elf Merchant, Generic Male High Elf Merchant, Generic Male Half Elf Merchant	
2005	Need for Speed: Most Wanted	Primary Officer #1	
2006	The Da Vinci Code	Dr. Robert Langdon	
2006	Need for Speed: Carbon	Primary Officer	
2007	Lair	Loden	
2007	The Darkness	Frances Fox, Leslie Hound, Daniel Fears	
2009	Marvel: Ultimate Alliance 2	Mister Fantastic	
2010	Dead to Rights: Retribution	Inness, Brawlers	
2010	Alpha Protocol	Albatross	
2010	StarCraft II: Wings of Liberty	Jim Raynor	
2011	TERA: The Exiled Realm of Arborea	Castanic, Human, Elf	
2011	Star Wars: The Old Republic	Supreme Chancellor Janarus, Senator Evran, Master Rajivari, Blaesus, Colonel Deulo, Colonel Finley, Gizmel, Major Jazen, Master Rubatin, Officer Silas, Sor-Nak, Taxi Droid	
2013	StarCraft II: Heart of the Swarm	Jim Raynor	
2013	Star Wars: The Old Republic: Rise of the Hutt Cartel	The Shroud	
2013	Marvel Heroes	Vulture	
2013	The Bureau: XCOM Declassified		
2013	Grand Theft Auto V	The Local Population	
2014	The Lego Movie Videogame		
2014	Star Wars: The Old Republic: Shadow of Revan	The Shroud	
2015	Xenoblade Chronicles X	Additional voices	
2015	Star Wars: The Old Republic: Knights of the Fallen Empire	The Shroud / Mandalorian Warrior	
2015	Heroes of the Storm	Jim Raynor	
2015	StarCraft II: Legacy of the Void	Jim Raynor	
2016	Batman: The Telltale Series	Jack Ryder, Commissioner Grogan, Enforcer	
2016	Star Wars: The Old Republic: Knights of the Eternal Throne	Captain Frem, GenoHaradan Leader, Zakuulan Socialite	
2017	Fire Emblem Heroes	Black Knight, Finn	
2017	Final Fantasy XV: Episode Gladiolus	Additional Voices	
2017	Batman: The Enemy Within	Jack Ryder, Mario Hernandez, Mourner, Newscaster 1	
2018	Super Smash Bros. Ultimate	Black Knight	
2020	The Last of Us Part II	Seth	
2022	Fire Emblem Warriors: Three Hopes	Count Hevring	
2023	Hellboy Web of Wyrd	Herman Rudolph von Werner	
2026	Grand Theft Auto VI	The Local Population	
