= History vs. Hollywood =

American television series

- Genre: Documentary
- Presented by: Josh Binswanger
- Narrated by: Burt Reynolds
- Country of origin: United States
- Original language: English

Production
- Running time: 22 minutes
- Production company: Prometheus Entertainment

Original release
- Network: History Channel
- Release: 1 January 2001 – 15 December 2004

History vs. Hollywood is an American television show on the History Channel. On the show, experts are interviewed on the historical accuracy of a film that is based on a historical event. For example, the movie The Last Samurai was featured in one episode in which military historian Geoffrey Wawro, professor of history at the University of North Texas, and director of the university's Barsanti Military History Center, compared the movie with the actual events (December 2003). On the show the expert guests discuss the factual accuracy of the film as well as the everyday objects that a person of the particular time period would have seen. In some episodes an expert or the host will go on a journey to the actual historical sites depicted in the film, or interview someone who witnessed the event firsthand. In each of the more than dozen episodes both expert guests and filmmakers will discuss the historical accuracy of the film dramatized.

The series was first released in 1999, and had been produced on a semi-regular basis continuing through at least 2005. The program was conceived, created and once directed by producer Steven Jack who also directed a majority of the episodes. Although the hour-long programs were made for television most episodes were shot on 35mm film.
