= Vegas Revolution =

Vegas Revolution is a 2008 Travel Channel show that goes behind the scenes of Las Vegas attractions. The series includes Vegas Spectacles, Vegas Adrenaline, Vegas Cravings, Vegas Extravagance, and Vegas Retreats. It is produced by Prometheus Entertainment.
