= Ancient Aliens =

American extraterrestrial visitation television series

- Genre: Pseudoscience; Pseudohistory; Ufology; Conspiracy theory
- Narrated by: Robert Clotworthy
- Country of origin: United States
- Original language: English
- No. of seasons: 22
- No. of episodes: 283 (list of episodes)

Production
- Executive producers: Kevin Burns (2009–2021) (Note: Kevin Burns (1955–2020) continues to receive posthumous production credits. Episodes produced prior to his death aired in 2021.); David Silver (2010–present); Susan Leventhal (2010–present); Giorgio A. Tsoukalos (2016–present)
- Camera setup: Multiple
- Running time: 90 minutes (season 1); 60 minutes (season 2–present)
- Production company: Prometheus Entertainment

Original release
- Network: History Channel
- Release: March 8, 2009 – present

Ancient Aliens is an American television series produced by Prometheus Entertainment that explores the pseudoscientific hypothesis of ancient astronauts in a non-critical, documentary format. Episodes also explore related pseudoscientific and pseudohistoric topics, such as: Atlantis and other lost ancient civilizations, extraterrestrial contact and ufology, and popular conspiracy theories. The series, which has aired on History since 2010, has been a target for criticism of History's channel drift, as well as criticism for promoting unorthodox or unproven hypotheses as fact. According to Smithsonian, episodes of the series overwhelm the viewer with "fictions and distortions" by using a Gish gallop.

Originally broadcast as two-hour documentary special in 2009, Ancient Aliens: The Series aired for three seasons as a flagship series on History from 2010 to 2012. The series moved to H2 from 2012 to 2014, with frequent re-airings of episodes on History and other A&E services. In 2015, the series returned to History after H2 was relaunched as Vice on TV. A nineteenth season began in 2023. All episodes are narrated by Robert Clotworthy.

The series is inspired by the works of Erich von Däniken, Zecharia Sitchin, Graham Hancock, Robert Bauval, Brinsley Trench, Charles Hapgood, and Edgar Cayce. Producer Giorgio Tsoukalos, writer David Childress and journalist Nick Pope are featured guests.

The series has been criticized by historians, cosmologists, archaeologists and other scientists for presenting and promoting pseudoscience, pseudohistory and pseudoarchaeology as fact. Episodes are frequently characterized as "far-fetched", "hugely speculative", and "expound[ing] wildly on theories suggesting that astronauts wandered the Earth freely in ancient times." Many of the claims made by guests are not commonly accepted as fact by the scientific community. Brian Dunning, debunking the series, called it "a slap in the face to the ingenuity of the human race".

== Production ==
Executive producer of the series was Kevin Burns from 2009 until his death in 2020 (with episodes he was involved with continuing to premiere through 2021). Giorgio Tsoukalos serves as consulting producer, and is a featured guest, appearing in every episode. UFO researcher C. Scott Littleton served as a producing consultant during the series development until his death in 2010.

Ancient Aliens originally aired a two-hour documentary special for the History Channel on March 8, 2009. The special was re-run several times, and is now packaged with the series as its pilot episode. Ancient Aliens: The Series aired on History from 2010 to 2011, then moved to H2 where it was promoted as one of the network's flagship series until 2014. Frequent re-airings of episodes continued on the History channel, with highlights and repackaged episodes airing on A&E and Lifetime. A selection of thirteen episodes which focused on the 2012 phenomenon was made available for syndication in the United States and Canada during the 2011–12 television season. In some foreign markets, the series still carries the Ancient Aliens: The Series title card.

In 2015, the series returned to History after H2 was relaunched as Viceland. In response to complaints from disgruntled fans, Viceland created Action Bronson Watches Ancient Aliens. History renewed Ancient Aliens for a fifteenth season which premiered on January 24, 2020. Due to COVID-19 pandemic disrupting production, the season ended after all completed episodes were broadcast. Production was soon restarted, and a sixteenth season began on November 13, 2020. A twentieth season began broadcast in 2024.

The spin-off series Ancient Aliens: Origins aired in 2024.

=== Premise and shared cosmology ===
The series is based on and inspired by the pseudoscientific ancient astronauts hypothesis popularized in Chariots of the Gods?, by Erich von Däniken, and The 12th Planet, by Zecharia Sitchin. According to von Däniken, Sitchin, and others, extraterrestrial beings visited Earth in the distant past and introduced civilization, architecture, and high technology to pre-historic humans. Many, if not all, of ancient man's achievements in language, mathematics, science, technology and architecture, such as the Egyptian pyramids, Pumapunku, Teotihuacan, and Stonehenge, are attributed to the influence of extraterrestrials.

Remnants of extraterrestrial visitations are claimed to be found in religious texts, ancient myths and legendary histories, in addition to fragments found in the sacred texts and practices of Hinduism, Ancient Egyptian religion, Gnostic Christianity, and more recent religious movements such as Mormonism. The hypothesis also holds that ancient visitations left etymological remnants in many of the world's languages, such as the root words for "Dagon", "dragon", "dog", and "Danann", or the frequent occurrence of the prefix anu- to mean "friend" or "visitor." Additionally, anatomically modern humans are alleged to be the result of genetic modification and/or modern humans are somehow biologically descended from ancient astronauts, which is the focus of many of von Däniken's and Sitchin's works.

There is little use of precise dates in many episodes. Guests use terms such as "the remote past", "prehistoric times", "ancient times", or they refer to "our ancient ancestors" in the abstract, when discussing hypothetical or alleged historical events. A frequent demarcation of pre-history from the modern era utilized by guests is "before or after 'The Ice Age'", or approximately 12,000 years ago. Many guests featured on the series, including Graham Hancock, and Robert Schoch, have claimed a sophisticated, or highly advanced, human civilization was destroyed at the end of the Ice Age. The survivors or descendants of the survivors helped restart civilization beginning 8,500 years ago.

Many guests featured on the series have expanded upon and promoted each another's hypotheses through their own work, developing a shared cosmogony concerning the origins of humanity and an anthropocentric cosmology that places significance on Sirius, Orion, Pleiades, the Moon, and Mars.

=== Presentation style ===
The series presents all claims made by guests in an uncritical, fast-paced format. The narration frequently frames claims made by guests or their responses as rhetorical questions which are answered with "ancient alien theorists say yes," or a variation thereof. After a particular claim is introduced, and explored in some detail, the narration cuts away with, "Perhaps more evidence can be found..." Another location, archeological find, or alleged event, with a hypothetical connection to the previous claim is introduced. Chariots of the Gods? used a similar framing device. Smithsonian described this presentation style as a Gish gallop, overwhelming the viewer with supposed evidence too quickly for them to fully consider any individual claim.

When comments or claims are made by guests there is no indication made (either by the narration or on-screen) whether they are speculating on the rhetorical question made by the interviewer or narration, or if they are repeating claims made by other researchers, or if they are speaking of their own work or expertise. Geologist Robert Schoch said portions of his own interviews for the series are sometimes inserted into the finished episodes in a manner which is out of context, or wholly disconnected from the questions asked of him on and off camera.

Writer David Childress, who appears in every episode, frequently concludes his comments with the exclamation, "—probably extraterrestrials!" Both Childress and Giorgio Tsoukalos repeatedly assert pre-historic peoples lacked the vocabulary to describe "technological" or "high-tech" devices (such as rockets or missiles, advanced weapons, aircraft, powered land vehicles, and medical instruments) that they allegedly witnessed, and thus referred to extraterrestrial visitors using such technology as gods.

Terms such as "ancient astronauts", "ancient aliens", "alien visitors", "extra-terrestrial beings", "ancient gods", and "otherworldly beings", are used interchangeably by guests and the narration. Guests frequently conflate the meaning of "theory" and "hypothesis", or they frequently obscure or ignore the difference between mythology and legendary history, and verifiable archaeology, anthropology, or documented history.

=== Frequent guests ===
In the first season, credentialed scientists and professionals, such as Sara Seager and Michael Denning, respond to claims made by other guests, but their rebuttals were not rigorous. In subsequent episodes, scientists and professionals offer explanations of scientific phenomena or historical events without endorsing claims made by other guests, or they offer personal commentary. Psychologist Jonathan Young appears in 123 episodes, providing explanations of myths and legends, and legendary history. Boston University associate professor Robert Schoch presents his Sphinx water erosion hypothesis, as well as his hypothesis concerning the age and purpose of Göbekli Tepe, in several episodes. Erich von Däniken is the featured guest in the pilot episode, in addition to being the focus of two biographical episodes: "The Von Däniken Legacy", in Season 5, and "The Alien Phenomena", in Season 13.

Radio talk show host George Noory appears in more than 80 episodes, including the pilot episode. Reverend Barry Downing, known for describing angels in the Bible as ancient astronauts, appears in the pilot episode, and his comments are repeated in later episodes. David Wilcock appears in 81 episodes. Writers Robert Bauval and Graham Hancock are frequent contributors to the series. They both express skepticism of ancient astronauts, instead discussing their own theories of ancient civilizations. Hancock repeats the statement from his work that "There is a forgotten episode in human history." Nick Pope and Travis S. Taylor are also frequent guests.

Segments and highlights from all first-season episodes, including the pilot, were edited into later episodes as late as Season 12, so that guests who appeared in Season 1 ostensibly appear in later seasons, although footage of their original interviews was re-used.

=== Evidence ===
In many episodes, little empirical evidence is offered to support the presented claims. Episodes or episode segments focus on out-of-place artifacts, such as: the London Hammer, Antikythera mechanism, or the Aiud object; or segments focus on alleged inconsistencies in the accepted historical record. Guests discuss evidence which supports their claims in general or abstract terms. Some guests have alleged professionals and government officials have suppressed evidence of ancient mysteries, such as the in episode "The Prototypes" during which guests alleged that the Smithsonian Institution suppressed findings of "giant humanoids" found alongside American Indian remains in the Kanawha Valley.

From Season 12 onward, some episodes have included segments in which evidence that potentially supports the ancient astronauts hypothesis is subjected to on-camera tests conducted by credentialed scientists and medical professionals. In the episode "The Science Wars", an elongated skull was subject to an MRI examination, and DNA was extracted and tested. In the episode "The Star Gods of Sirius" blue, porous, nitrogen-rich stones, allegedly retrieved from the site of an alien visitation were examined by geologists. However, none of the results—from the skull, the stones, or other objects examined in later episodes—proved conclusive.

=== Other claims ===
Other claims linked to the ancient astronauts hypothesis featured on the series include: UFOs, alien abductions, the Roswell incident and Rendlesham Forest incident, panspermia, and human space exploration. Guests have presented other pseudohistorical and pseudoscientific hypotheses related to, or dependent upon an understanding of: Atlantis and other lost civilizations as described in works by Brinsley Trench and Edgar Cayce; or ley lines as originally described by Alfred Watkins, or more recent interpretations; cataclysmic pole shifts as promoted by Charles Hapgood; various forms of Christian and Hindu creationism, or pseudohistory and legendary history promoted followers of various new religious movements; mythical and gnostic elements of the Kabbalah, Zohar, and Book of Enoch.

Other concepts explored include: faith healing, remote viewing, and various psychic phenomena. Guests frequently discuss various forms of catastrophism, and refer to other featured guests or historical figures as catastrophists. In several episodes, guests have claimed prominent historical figures were either influenced by or were possibly "extra-terrestrial" or "otherworldly beings." Guests have also discussed unrelated pseudoscientific claims, such as: dinosaurs coexisting with humans until a recent extinction event, crystal healing and crystal skulls, as well as Freemasonry, Rosicrucianism, and the New World Order.

Linda Moulton Howe appears in several episodes which explore alien abduction, animal mutilation, and conspiracies involving alleged military installations on Antarctica. The 2013 Citizen Hearing on Disclosure features prominently in numerous episodes, such as Season 14's "The Nuclear Agenda".

Prior to December 2012, several episodes explored aspects of the 2012 Mayan doomsday prophecy. The episodes "The Maya Conspiracy" and "The Doomsday Prophecies", which aired in February 2012, explored the Maya calendar and its relation to the construction of Palenque, the god Kukulkan, in addition to links between the Maya civilization and the ancient astronaut hypothesis. However, many featured artifacts, structures, and remains were actually Aztec, Zapotec, or Olmec, and not Maya. Episodes focusing on Mesoamerica broadcast after 2012 make no mention of the 2012 phenomenon. In the episode "The God Particle", guests linked the Mayan long count to the discovery of the Higgs boson.

== Episodes ==
Season	Episodes	Originally released	
Season	Episodes	First released	Last released
Pilot		March 8, 2009	
1	5	April 20, 2010	May 25, 2010
2	10	October 28, 2010	December 30, 2010
3	16	July 28, 2011	November 23, 2011
4	10	February 17, 2012	May 4, 2012
5	12	December 21, 2012	April 19, 2013
6	11	September 30, 2013	December 13, 2013
7	8	January 24, 2014	March 14, 2014
8	9	June 13, 2014	August 22, 2014
9	12	October 31, 2014	May 1, 2015
10	10	July 24, 2015	October 9, 2015
11	15	May 6, 2016	September 2, 2016
12	16	April 28, 2017	September 15, 2017
13	15	April 27, 2018	January 7, 2019
14	22	May 31, 2019	November 29, 2019
15	12	January 24, 2020	April 18, 2020
16	10	November 13, 2020	March 12, 2021
17	7	August 6, 2021	October 8, 2021
18	20	January 7, 2022	September 16, 2022
19	20	January 6, 2023	September 15, 2023
20	20	January 5, 2024	September 13, 2024
21	17	February 7, 2025	November 6, 2025
22	15	January 15, 2026	—

== Reception ==
The program had 1.676 million viewers in late October 2010, 2.034 million viewers in mid-December (for the "Unexplained Structures" episode), and in late-January 2011 the series had 1.309 million viewers.

=== Critical response ===
The series has been criticized by historians, cosmologists, archaeologists and other scientists for presenting and promoting pseudoscience, pseudohistory and pseudoarchaeology as fact. Episodes are frequently characterized as "far-fetched", "hugely speculative", and "expound[ing] wildly on theories suggesting that astronauts wandered the Earth freely in ancient times." Many of the claims made by guests are not commonly accepted as fact by the scientific community. In 2009, history professor Ronald H. Fritze observed that pseudoscience has a periodic popularity in the U.S.:

In a pop culture with a short memory and a voracious appetite, aliens and pyramids and lost civilizations are recycled like fashions.

Brad Lockwood of Forbes characterized Ancient Aliens as an example of History's channel drift toward "programs devoted to monsters, aliens, and conspiracies". He added that, "Ancient Aliens defies all ability to suspend disbelief for the sake of entertainment." Alex Knapp, also of Forbes, cited archaeologist Keith Fitzpatrick-Matthews' rebuke of History for treating "nonsense as though it were fact."

In 2011, South Park parodied the series in the episode "A History Channel Thanksgiving". Ramsey Isler of IGN commented, "The aim is placed squarely on Ancient Aliens specifically". South Park's animation style created "a perfect satire of all the ridiculousness of this series, including the black and white art with aliens photoshopped in, and interviews with people of dubious authority".

Science writer Riley Black was critical of the series—particularly an episode that suggested "aliens exterminated dinosaurs to make way for our species"—which she characterized as "some of the most noxious sludge in television's bottomless chum bucket." Black accused the series of employing a Gish gallop technique to overwhelm the viewer with many "fictions and distortions."

Others have called attention to a paucity of opposing viewpoints, such as Kenneth Feder, Professor of Archaeology at Central Connecticut State University and author of Frauds, Myths, and Mysteries: Science and Pseudoscience in Archaeology. He was approached by producers with requests to appear in several episodes: "My response was, I'd be happy to be on your show, but you should know that I think that the ancient astronaut hypothesis is execrable bullshit." He added, "I haven't heard back from them, rather remarkably. So, I guess maybe they're not interested in the other point of view." In 2016, Vice on TV producer Jordan Kinley said of Ancient Aliens claims:

You feel kind of lost when someone questions the historical narrative you've been taught. I don't believe much of what's talked about ... but I think it's a good time for people to realize that some of our history is manufactured. Some of it is manufactured to be accurate, and some of it is manufactured to excuse horrible things that have happened.

In the 2019 issue of Public Archaeology, Franco D. Rossi of Johns Hopkins University published a retrospective of his experience at the 2018 Boston Alien Con. He characterized Ancient Aliens and its fans as a "science fiction fandom" which also trafficked in "misinformation" and "conspiracies." He warned professionals in various history fields will have to reckon with ancient astronaut hypothesis and its adherents. In March 2020, podcaster Brian Dunning challenged and debunked many of the claims featured on Ancient Aliens. At the conclusion of the third episode, Dunning quoted Kenneth Feder's book Frauds, Myths, and Mysteries: Science and Pseudoscience in Archaeology:

I realize that for some of you I'm being mean, snarky, and inflexible on this topic. And you'd be right. But in the face of a program and, at its core, a philosophy that is based on assumptions that degrade and diminish the inherent human capacity to invent, create, build, cooperate, and rise to the occasion to solve great technological challenges, both in the present and in the past [...]

Dunning emphasized Feder's conclusion: "I maintain that meanness and inflexibility are entirely appropriate responses."

=== Critical response by guests ===
Many guests featured in episodes of the series have publicly expressed skepticism of the series' premise or of the ancient astronaut hypothesis. In the pilot episode, Sister Ilia Delio of the Washington Theological Union repeated comments made previously about the predilection for literalism common among supporters of the ancient astronaut hypothesis:

Can we liken Ezekiel's chariot to a UFO? The ancients used myth and metaphor and images to describe their experience of God. I think what we don't want to fall to is a type of 'fundamental literalism'. The stories of the Old Testament emerge out of the people of that time, out of their own context, to make sense of their experience of God. We can gain insight by reading the Old Testament and reading about Ezekiel's chariot, but it's not to draw a strict analogy between his chariot and a UFO.

At a 2014 hearing of the House Committee on Science, Seth Shostak said, "The public is fascinated with the idea that we may be being visited now, or maybe in the past," but there is not any evidence which has convinced him "that we were visited in [historical] times." Shostak has appeared in twelve episodes. In a 2018 episode of The Joe Rogan Experience, Robert Schoch said promoters of the ancient astronaut hypothesis "want everything to be 'ancient aliens'", which in his view was "sort of a cop-out". He added those same promoters are often motivated to sell books, DVDs, and conference tickets instead of presenting facts. Belief in the ancient alien hypothesis and other ancient mysteries "fills a void" for some people, according to Schoch, but he "tries to fill that void with something real."

William Shatner, who appeared in the Season 16 episode "William Shatner Meets Ancient Aliens ", told Inverse: "I had some spirited discussions with these experts who believe aliens were here, and like most people, I was dubious about the whole thing." He added, "They intrigued me enough to think something's going on."

== Related media ==
Many guests featured on Ancient Aliens appear in other History channel series and specials, such as The Secret of Skinwalker Ranch, America's Book of Secrets, and The Curse of Oak Island. Segments from those series have appeared in Ancient Aliens. William Shatner, who appears in two episodes of Ancient Aliens, presents The UnXplained which explores many of the topics featured in episodes Ancient Aliens. Shatner narrated the English-language version of Mystery of the Gods (1976) which was based on von Däniken's books published after Chariots of the Gods?.

=== Ancient Aliens meme ===
The original meme's screenshot depicting Giorgio A. Tsoukalos

Tsoukalos's appearances in Ancient Aliens inspired a meme highlighting his unusual hairstyle overlaid with the caption: "I'm not saying it was aliens ... but ..." Variations of the meme were uploaded by users as early as November 2010. According to Dictionary.com, the meme mimicked "the tone of conviction used by Tsoukalos to present unfounded far-fetched pseudo-logic as fact."

=== Alien Con ===
From 2016 to 2018, A&E Networks co-produced a number of multi-day events branded as "Alien Con". Some events were organized as symposia, and others were organized as residential conventions similar to Worldcon. Guests from the series hosted several panels, in addition to offering book signings and photos. Footage from the conventions hosted in 2016 and 2017 were featured during Seasons 11, 12 and 13. Highlights from the 2018 Baltimore Alien Con were featured during the Season 14 episode "Project Hybrid".

=== Action Bronson Watches Ancient Aliens ===
In April 2016, Viceland released Action Bronson Watches Ancient Aliens, which was followed by a ten-episode series, later retitled Traveling the Stars. Each episode features rapper Action Bronson and celebrity guests watching episodes of Ancient Aliens while intoxicated by cannabis. The series is presented in a comedy-documentary format which parodies Ancient Aliens's presentation style.

Bronson praised Ancient Aliens, saying it is "the best thing that was ever created by man." According to producers Jordan Kinley and Hannah Gregg, Traveling the Stars was developed as a response to complaints by disgruntled viewers of H2 which Viceland's programming replaced. Traveling the Stars was renewed for a second season in 2019.

=== Illustrated companion and game ===
A companion to the series, Ancient Aliens: The Official Companion Book (ISBN 978-0-06-245541-3) was published in November 2016. Included was an overview of the ancient astronaut hypothesis, and introductions to a number of topics explored by the television series up to Season 11. The audiobook adaptation, which is no longer available, featured the voices of Giorgio A. Tsoukalos, Angela Cartwright, Bill Mumy, Robert Clotworthy, and producer Kevin Burns.

Ancient Aliens: The Game is a city-building game developed by Fifth Column Games. The user plays as an alien-human hybrid who must oversee the construction of the Great Pyramid of Giza. The game was released in 2016 as a free-to-play mobile and Facebook game. A PC port was released by Legacy Games in September 2022.

=== Film adaptation ===
In April 2021, Counterbalance Entertainment announced they had closed a deal with Legendary Entertainment to produce a film adaptation of Ancient Aliens. Josh Heald, creator of Cobra Kai, will direct a script written by Luke Ryan, who will also executive-produce. In July 2022, Legendary announced Craig Titley would write the feature script with Josh Heald to direct in partnership with Counterbalance Entertainment.

== See also ==
- List of topics characterized as pseudoscience
- Ancient Astronauts
