= Geoffrey Wawro =

American historian

Geoffrey Wawro (born 1960) is an American professor of military history at the University of North Texas, and director of the UNT Military History Center. His focus is modern and contemporary military history, from the French Revolution to the present.

== Education ==
Wawro grew up in West Hartford, Connecticut and as a boy delivered newspapers for the Hartford Courant. He received his diploma from the Loomis-Chaffee School in Windsor, Connecticut in 1978, and his A-levels in English Literature and German from Cheltenham College, in England, the following year. After receiving his bachelor's degree magna cum laude from Brown University (1983), he attended Yale University, where he received his Master of Arts in European history (1987), his M.Phil. in European History in 1989, and his Ph.D. in 1992. His dissertation, entitled "The Austro-Prussian War: Politics, Strategy and War in the Habsburg Monarchy, 1859-1866" (1992), supervised by Paul Kennedy, argued that the battle of Königgrätz (1866) was not so much won by the brilliance of the Prussian commander Helmuth von Moltke the Elder as it was lost by the incompetence of the Austrian commander Ludwig von Benedek.

== Career ==
Wawro hosted the History Channel's book show Hardcover History, and was host and anchor of the History Channel programs History's Business and History vs. Hollywood, Hard Target, Global View, and History in Focus. His guests have included Jimmy Carter, Henry Kissinger, Jack Welch, Robert Rubin, Caspar Weinberger, Warren Christopher, Niall Ferguson, Richard Overy, Stephen Ambrose, Michael Howard, Robert Dallek, Paul Theroux and Arthur Schlesinger, Jr.

Wawro, an expert on military innovation and international security in Europe, the U.S., and Canada, was also (before his move to Texas) Professor of Strategic Studies at the U.S. Naval War College as well as the Naval War College Review's "special correspondent," a designation that took him to "places or events of strategic or technological interest," including Iran, Brazil and the Paris Air Show.

Wawro won the Austrian Cultural Institute Prize and the Society for Military History Moncado Prize for Excellence in the Writing of Military History. From 1989 to 1991, he was Fulbright Scholar at University of Vienna, Austria, and from 1991 to 1992, an Andrew W. Mellon Doctoral Fellow at Yale University.

== Criticism ==
In a review of Wawro's 1996 book on the Austro-Prussian War, Lawrence Sondhaus criticizes Wawro for falsely claiming that the Austrian Empire intended to destroy the Kingdom of Italy in the Third Italian War of Independence of 1866. Wawro gives no evidence for his thesis of Austrian aggression and then proceeds to lambaste the Austrians for not achieving "goals they never intended to pursue". Wawro also ignores Italy's "sweeping war aims"; her intentions of seizing Trieste, Istria, and Dalmatia, aims that were prevented by the Austrian victory at the Battle of Lissa, and claims the Italians only wanted to acquire Venetia. Historian Ross Kennedy reviewed Wawro's book Sons of Freedom: The Forgotten American Soldiers Who Defeated Germany in World War I. Kennedy acknowledged the book’s ambitious scope and its vivid narrative style. Kennedy appreciated the book’s effort to bring attention to often-overlooked American contributions but also raised concerns about some of Wawro’s interpretations. He questioned the extent to which the AEF alone “defeated Germany,” suggesting that the book may overstate American primacy at the expense of Allied efforts.

== Publications ==
- Austro-Prussian War(Cambridge, 1996), based on his doctoral dissertation, was History Book Club and Military Book Club main selection.
- Warfare and Society in Europe, 1792-1914 (Routledge, 2000) is a standard university text.
- The Franco-Prussian War: The German Conquest of France in 1870-1871 (Cambridge University Press, 2003) was the main selection of the History Book Club and Military Book Club and received a best non-fiction mention from Publishers Weekly, Nov. 2003.
- Quicksand: America's Pursuit of Power in the Middle East, Penguin Press, 2010.
- A Mad Catastrophe: The Outbreak of World War I and the Collapse of the Habsburg Empire, Basic Books, 2014.
- Sons of Freedom: The Forgotten American Soldiers Who Defeated Germany in World War I, 2018.
- The Vietnam War: A Military History, 2024

He has also served on the editorial teams for over twenty volumes, including The Cambridge Military Histories, which he co-edits with Oxford's Hew Strachan.
