= Star Wars: The Legacy Revealed =

- Narrated by: Robert Clotworthy
- Country of origin: United States

Production
- Running time: 90 minutes

Original release
- Network: History Channel
- Release: May 28, 2007

Star Wars: The Legacy Revealed (TLR) is a television documentary which premiered on the History Channel in May 2007. It was produced by Prometheus Entertainment in association with The History Channel and Lucasfilm Ltd. The executive producer and director was Emmy Award-winning filmmaker Kevin Burns.

The special focuses on how Star Wars is relevant today and the history that inspired it, and also makes various connections to Greek mythology. It consists of a number of interviews with well-known politicians, journalists and critics, such as John Lyden, professor Chad Stanley, Tom Brokaw, Stephen Colbert and Peter Jackson, along with historical content and clips from all six of the Star Wars movies.

== Synopsis ==
The first main subject of the special discusses the origins of films as they were written in the early 1970s, during a time of social unrest and political upheaval. When Star Wars was released it reaffirmed the notion that there is such a thing as good versus evil and evil must be defeated. The films made use of Joseph Campbell's model of the hero's journey as discussed in the book The Hero With a Thousand Faces.

In Star Wars, two characters embark on the hero's journey, Anakin Skywalker and his son Luke. Luke starts out as a nobody much like Dorothy, Harry Potter and King Arthur, and what he needs is a call to adventure. Luke would reject the call as did Moses, but after the violent murder of his aunt and uncle he resolves to go. The Cantina scene is what Joseph Campbell referred to as the threshold crossing, meaning that you're no longer at home and your journey will be a dangerous one.

Yoda, Obi-Wan Kenobi and Qui-Gon Jinn represent the importance of the hero's need for a mentor. They discuss the etymology of the word mentor, coming from the name of Mentor, who watched over Odysseus's son Telemachus. It says that a key element to the mentor is that they give the hero a gift. In Luke Skywalker's case, it is Obi-Wan giving him a lightsaber. The hero gives his life to stop evil. The importance of the Force is another topic, saying that any religious background can associate, and it is basically believing in something higher, and that everything has a purpose. The mentor cannot stay forever, and it is crucial that they do not stay to help. Yet, the mentor is still within. This is shown by Obi-Wan's downfall in the hands of Darth Vader, but Obi-Wan is still there inside of Luke.

The hero relies on the friendship of others. The show includes comparing Jabba the Hutt to a dragon, where he steals the damsel in distress. The planet of Naboo is spoken of in reference of Nabu, the Queen of Wisdom in Babylon. Padmé Amidala, who is from Naboo (pronounced the same as the God), is also said to be "the Queen of Wisdom". Luke and Leia are said to be like Apollo and Artemis.

Another large portion of the special was focused on Han Solo. Han Solo's name represents him, Solo meaning "one". Unlike other characters, who were based on mythical archetypes, he is seen more as a wild west outlaw because he personifies independence, self-reliance, and depends on no one but himself. In some parts of the Star Wars saga, it might seem like a Wild West town, where no one cares what happens as long as it is cleaned up. Tom Brokaw describes the series as a "Western in the future".

There's one part that discusses the need for companions and faithful followers. The comic relief of Star Wars is R2-D2 and C-3PO. The two robots are compared to Abbott and Costello, Laurel and Hardy and Tom and Jerry. Jar Jar Binks, the childlike innocent, grows up throughout the films and gains responsibility, allowing for children to connect to him. They have been influenced by such classic cartoon characters as Mickey Mouse, Donald Duck, Bugs Bunny, Daffy Duck and Porky Pig.

The journey of a hero is also of large importance. The hero must undergo tests that will make him stronger, sometimes having to face their worst fears or confront their nightmares. The extent to which Lucas used ideas from mythologist Joseph Campbell is discussed by Jonathan Young of the Campbell Archives.

For every hero, it says, there must be a villain. Darth Vader is portrayed as the ruthless enforcer. Confronting the villain is a critical part of the hero's journey. The show says that there is a dramatic regard and excitement to choosing evil over good. When Palpatine tempts Anakin with power, it is like the serpent tempting Eve with the apple. When Anakin succumbs to the Dark Side, it is like the man who sells his soul to the devil. This is also compared to John Milton's Paradise Lost, where Lucifer, a good angel, wages war on Heaven and is cast out, forcing him to his own place in Hell. The battle on Mustafar symbolises an apocalyptic atmosphere and mirrors Anakin internally. When he has no humanity left and becomes the mechanical monster of Darth Vader, it is said to be like Frankenstein's Monster.

Star Wars also reflects a cycle in our own history, the fall of republics and the rise of dictators, political corruption and democratic backsliding. Palpatine seizes power gradually, and is compared to Adolf Hitler and Saddam Hussein. The Republic is shown as the Roman Empire, such as pod races being similar to chariot races. Citizens indulge in rituals of sacrifice and slaughter as well as gladiatorial combat. Palpatine's story reflects that of Napoleon. Another big part states that society is in a continual process of construction and self-destruction.

The Legacy Revealed shows many connections between the Nazis and the Empire. Examples shown are that Vader's own troops, Stormtroopers, share the same name with Hitler's. The black, white, and red used in many scenes with the Empire are the same colors of the swastika, and that Darth Vader's helmet is similar to that of the German Army's. The Republic also embraced diversity, while the Empire did not. There are no women in the Empire, showing that there is no purity or life.

According to the show, the Rebels win in the end because of their trust in something else, in themselves, rather than technology. This is illustrated when Luke turns off his targeting computer during the attack on the Death Star and uses the force to guide him. In the end, there's a Christian-like redemptive moment, where Luke overturns the Dark Side and brings salvation to his father. Once Vader dies, Luke burns his body on a pyre, like in The Iliad where Priam burns Hector's body.

The last scenes of the show feature a few politicians. They talk of people that join together for a common goal and power always belongs to the people. Star Wars is then said that even though there are strong mythological influences in it, it becomes a mythology all its own.

== Featured interviews ==
- J. J. Abrams
- Tom Brokaw
- Stephen Colbert
- Joan Breton Connelly
- Linda Ellerbee
- Steven Galipeau
- Newt Gingrich
- Mary Henderson
- Edward L. Hudgins
- Peter Jackson
- Dr. John C. Lyden
- Elvis Mitchell
- Dr. Camille Paglia
- Nancy Pelosi
- Dan Rather
- Dr. Carl A. Rubino
- Dr. Carl Silvio
- Kevin Smith
- Dr. Kevin J. Wetmore, Jr.
- Joss Whedon
- Leon Wieseltier
- Dr. Jonathan Young

== Reception ==
The documentary was nominated for 3 Emmy Awards, for Outstanding Non-fiction Special, Outstanding Writing (Non-fiction), and Outstanding Directing (Non-fiction).

== See also ==
- George Lucas
- Greek mythology
- Star Wars
- Star Wars sources and analogues
