= Prometheus Entertainment =

Television production company

Prometheus Entertainment is an American production company, specializing in documentary, reality, and non-fiction television programming and specials.

== History ==
Prometheus Entertainment was formed in March 1999 by Kevin Burns. It was housed at Fox Television Studios and was originally slated to produce scripted entertainment for Fox, focused on documentaries and non-fiction. In 2002, Prometheus Entertainment developed a revival of Playboy After Dark. In 2008, it signed a deal with the Travel Channel to produce 23 hours' worth of new shows. Their documentary Star Wars: The Legacy Revealed was nominated for three Emmy Awards.

== Programs ==
- The Secret of Skinwalker Ranch, 2020–present
- The UnXplained, 2019–present
- The Curse of Civil War Gold, 2018–2019
- The Tesla Files, 2018
- In Search of Aliens, 2014
- The Curse of Oak Island, 2014–present
- Kendra on Top, 2012-2017
- America's Book of Secrets, 2012–2014
- Food Paradise, 2008–2012
- Kendra, 2009–2011
- Holly's World, 2009–2011
- Ancient Aliens, 2009–present
- The Face Is Familiar, 2009
- Bridget's Sexiest Beaches, 2009
- The Telling, 2009
- Look, Up in the Sky: The Amazing Story of Superman, 2006
- Star Wars Tech, 2007
- High Maintenance 90210, 2007
- Hollywood Science, 2006
- The Girls Next Door, 2005–2010
- Medical Investigation, 2004–2005
- History vs. Hollywood, 2000

== TV films ==
- Star Wars: The Legacy Revealed, 2007
- Empire of Dreams, 2004
