= America's Book of Secrets =

- Genre: Docuseries
- Written by: Kevin Burns, et al.
- Narrated by: Jonathan Adams (seasons 1–3); Lance Reddick (season 4)
- Country of origin: United States
- Original language: English
- No. of seasons: 4
- No. of episodes: 43

Production
- Executive producer: Kevin Burns
- Running time: 44 min.
- Production company: Prometheus Entertainment

Original release
- Network: History
- Release: January 15, 2012 – July 20, 2021

America's Book of Secrets is a documentary series about mysterious or little known aspects of U.S. history, theories about secrets that are possibly being hidden from the public, and hidden sources of the social issues that face the country. Episodes deal with topics such as government coverups, organized crime gangs, the War on Drugs, white supremacy movements, cults, presidential assassinations and coup attempts, terrorist attacks, extraterrestrials, Bigfoot, government surveillance, covert military operations, secret societies and American oligarchs.

The series is ranked #5 in popularity among History Vault programs.

The series was described by Zack Johnston on Uproxx as one of the best conspiracy documentaries on Netflix.

Parrot Analytics, which rates media demand for advertisers, ranks America's Book of Secrets in the 89.9th percentile in terms of demand by TV documentary viewers, meaning the program is more popular than 89.9% of available documentary programs.

On April 27, 2021, Lance Reddick announced on Facebook that he would host season 4.

== Episodes ==
=== Series overview ===
| Season | Episodes | Originally released | |
| Season | Episodes | First released | Last released |
|---|---|---|---|
| 1 | 11 | January 15, 2012 | March 31, 2012 |
| 2 | 12 | April 5, 2013 | June 21, 2013 |
| 3 | 10 | March 3, 2014 | May 31, 2014 |
| 4 | 10 | May 11, 2021 | July 20, 2021 |

=== Season 1 (2012) ===
| No. overall | No. in season | Title | Original release date |
|---|---|---|---|
| 1 | 1 | "The Monuments" | January 15, 2012 |
In America, behind the public facade of nine of our most famed institutions and landmark structures, there is another world that is hidden from view. The special pierces the veil of secrecy which conceals forbidden histories and fascinating insider information from the public.
| 2 | 2 | "The White House" | January 21, 2012 |
An inside look at the secret protocols, elite security and hidden history of the world's most public of private residences. What is the most secret room in the White House and what makes it so powerful?
| 3 | 3 | "Freemasons" | January 28, 2012 |
It is America's most private organization with secretive meetings and a membership that includes the most powerful men in America--and the world. But behind this elite brotherhood... are secrets.
| 4 | 4 | "Fort Knox" | February 4, 2012 |
It is one of the most secure structures in the world. It safeguards the vast wealth of the United States... And its name is synonymous with one of the most precious commodities in the history of the world--gold.
| 5 | 5 | "Area 51" | February 11, 2012 |
It is one of the most covert military bases on American soil, protecting the nation's most confidential research and development. For decades, the highest levels of government had denied its existence.
| 6 | 6 | "The Playboy Mansion" | February 18, 2012 |
It is America's most infamous address, a place where fantasies come to life--and anything goes. But behind the security cameras and stonewalls of the Playboy Mansion are secrets.
| 7 | 7 | "Presidential Transports" | February 25, 2012 |
They are the most advanced and heavily protected vehicles ever built--operated by technicians prepared for the worst. But behind the bullet proof glass and armored plating of the President's fleet of vehicles are secrets.
| 8 | 8 | "The FBI" | March 10, 2012 |
It is America's most powerful police force--made up of an elite team of Special Agents secretly patrolling the nation--and the world. While its patriotic mission is public knowledge, the FBI's tactics are classified.
| 9 | 9 | "West Point" | March 17, 2012 |
It is the most prestigious military academy in the world. A place where cutting-edge technology converges with battle-proven tradition. But inside this launch pad for the Army's elite are secrets. Go inside the 200-year-old university to uncover the complex selection process, secret rituals and traditions and special training that each cadet experiences at the renowned institution.
| 10 | 10 | "Black Ops" | March 24, 2012 |
They are top-secret missions manned by specially trained intelligence and military elite. Covert operations using unconventional tactics outside the standard protocol.
| 11 | 11 | "The Pentagon" | March 31, 2012 |
It is the epicenter of America's military operations... a five-sided fortress with a single purpose--to defend the United States and its citizens. But behind the concrete walls and re-enforced windows are secrets. Enter the headquarters of the U.S. Department of Defense and explore the complex operations and top-secret business conducted at the largest low-rise office building in the world.

=== Season 2 (2013) ===
| No. overall | No. in season | Title | Original release date |
|---|---|---|---|
Season
| 12 | 1 | "The Ancient Astronaut Cover-Up" | April 5, 2013 |
The notion of a universe inhabited by alien creatures can be found just about everywhere in American popular culture. But could mankind really have been visited by alien beings from other worlds?
| 13 | 2 | "The Mafia" | April 12, 2013 |
For decades, the criminal organization known as "The Mafia" has stained the fabric of American society. But what are the secrets behind the Mob's sinister success? According to the FBI, the American Mafia still has approximately 3,000 active members.
| 14 | 3 | "The Ku Klux Klan" | April 19, 2013 |
They are the original domestic terrorists, hiding underneath white hoods and flowing robes, and taking cover in the rights and freedoms that they are actively seeking to destroy.
| 15 | 4 | "Serial Killers" | April 26, 2013 |
They are secretly stalking America's streets and highways, hiding in plain sight and compelled by one simple motive: the thrill of taking another person's life. Since the 1970s, the United States has produced an estimated 1,400 serial killers.
| 16 | 5 | "American Nazis" | May 3, 2013 |
There are nearly 200 neo-Nazi groups currently operating in the United States--and they are strongly allied to a loose network of numerous other "white and Aryan power" hate groups.
| 17 | 6 | "Deadly Cults" | May 10, 2013 |
According to government statistics, there are an estimated 5,000 cults currently operating in the United States. And each year there are approximately 200,000 Americans who serve as secret--and, for the most part, willing--members.
| 18 | 7 | "Presidential Cover Ups" | May 17, 2013 |
The office of the President of the United States was designed to operate with greater transparency than any other world-leader... but how much do we really know about what goes on behind the doors of the Oval Office?
| 19 | 8 | "The Drug Wars" | May 24, 2013 |
This episode uncovers the conspiracies behind America's 40-year drug campaign. Why does the U.S. Government classify marijuana and heroin as equally dangerous drugs, and will the move by some states to legalize marijuana change how this drug is viewed?
| 20 | 9 | "The Mystery of Bigfoot" | May 31, 2013 |
Bigfoot is everywhere you look, but why are so many millions of Americans obsessed with this mysterious man-ape? This episode sheds new light on some of the nation's darkest Sasquatch secrets.
| 21 | 10 | "Presidential Assassins" | June 7, 2013 |
Over the last centuries, there have been four successful presidential assassinations and a multitude of failed attempts. But do we know the real story behind these assassination plots?
| 22 | 11 | "Lost Treasures" | June 14, 2013 |
American treasure hunters are convinced that there are missing fortunes just waiting to be discovered all around the country. But is it a harmless hobby, or do treasure hunters find themselves locked in a battle with other searchers?
| 23 | 12 | "Hells Angels" | June 21, 2013 |
No club in America is more secretive than the Hells Angels. Members are forbidden to publicly discuss their biker brotherhood and others who have "insider" information are too afraid to talk... until now.

=== Season 3 (2014) ===
| No. overall | No. in season | Title | Original release date |
|---|---|---|---|
| 24 | 1 | "Scientology" | March 3, 2014 |
It is one of the most secret organizations in America. A religion--based on the cosmic revelations of an inspired genius--that boasts more than 100,000 faithful followers throughout the world. We'll reveal the hidden origins, strict doctrine, secret language and celebrity allure of the wealthy and influential institution. Former Scientologists disclose the reasons they were drawn to the church--and why they left. Jenna Miscavige Hill, niece of Scientology's current leader, David Miscavige, describes her difficult experiences inside the organization. Former church executive, Mark Rathbun, demonstrates Scientology's most revered spiritual technology--the "E-Meter." And watchdog Tony Ortega explains the appeal of Scientology that draws in new members. Could the Church of Scientology really be what its critics say it is? Is it a cult--masquerading as a religion? A business that will stop at nothing to control its members--and their bank accounts?
| 25 | 2 | "Big Brother" | April 2014 |
This episode uncovers the secret surveillance methods the government and big business use to watch, monitor and record our every move. Government whistleblowers, Thomas Drake and Jesselyn Radack, reveal how the NSA decided to aggressively monitor Americans' correspondence after 9/11. Documentarian Cullen Hoback explains how the government has partnered with Silicon Valley high-tech companies like Facebook and Yahoo to gather data on every American citizen. And former computer hacker Sammy Kamkar explains how someone could watch you from inside your own home. Buzzing drones overhead. Emails monitored and stored. Cell phone records tracked and analyzed. In today's digital age, is the concept of privacy now extinct? There are those who believe Big Brother is already here--and that the secret monitoring of American citizens has only just begun.
| 26 | 3 | "American Terrorists" | April 5, 2014 |
We usually think of terrorists as people from "other" countries. But domestic terrorism, by foreign nationals on visas and by U.S. citizens alike, is also a huge problem.
| 27 | 4 | "The Gold Conspiracy" | April 19, 2014 |
Gold. It is one of the most precious metals in the world. A glittering commodity so rare that people will go to great lengths to obtain it. But who sets the price? And what are the secret methods to control its value?Uncover the clandestine world surrounding the highly prized precious metal. How much gold does the United States really have--and where is it locked away? Is the American government overstating the amount of gold in its reserves to create the mystique of financial superiority? Former U.S. Secretary of Labor Robert Reich discusses the gold standard and the possible manipulation of the commodities markets. Chairman of Euro Pacific Precious Metals Peter Schiff describes how gold could replace credit cards. And author Matthew Hart details how the U.S. is storing gold that belongs to other countries--but may now be missing from the Federal Reserve's vaults.
| 28 | 5 | "America's Secret Armies" | April 26, 2014 |
They operate in the shadows... Men trained to kill... without leaving a trace. But who are these secret forces? What are their covert methods? And, can they be trusted to protect the interests of the American people? Delve into the clandestine operations of the United States most expertly trained secret weapons. But what exactly are these surreptitious services designed to do--and whom do these stealth-like soldiers ultimately report to? Are the strategies of these covert armies effective in keeping the United States one step ahead of its power hungry enemies? National Security Attorney Mark Zaid reveals details about the prestigious Delta Force unit that have remained a well-kept secret--until now. Former Attorney General John Ashcroft discusses the concept of asymmetrical warfare and how our government employs it today. And author Peter Singer describes the underground war being waged over the internet.
| 29 | 6 | "Secret Prisons" | May 3, 2014 |
Go inside the maximum-security world of America's "secret prisons" and unveil their hidden agendas and covert operations. With about 1 in every 107 Americans serving time, why are there more people incarcerated in the United States than anywhere else in the world? Former inmate, Andy Stephanian, reveals details of his lock-up at the Communication Management Unit, a prison that holds some of the country's greatest security threats. Director of the ACLU National Prison Project, David Fathi, describes the "Kids for Cash" scandal and the under-the-radar Debtors' Prisons. And Former Warden, Daniel Vasquez, explains the big-business surrounding private prisons and FEMA Camps. While some may fear the thought of dangerous criminals walking the streets, there may be an even more terrifying threat--that virtually anyone can end up behind bars.
| 30 | 7 | "The Billionaire Agenda" | May 10, 2014 |
This episode reveals the underground world of America's wealthiest citizens and the depths at which their power and influence take root. Do billionaires think they know better than the majority? Are the American masses just objects to control? Forbes Editor Luisa Kroll talks about the growing wealth of the super-rich and the exclusive billionaire communities that are forming around them. Former United States Secretary of Labor Robert Reich divulges how billionaires' "dark money" influences American politics in ways that are off-limits to public scrutiny. And Author Mark Dice discusses the Bilderberg Group, the world's most secretive society of billionaires and the extreme measures they take to ensure that what happens behind closed doors stays behind closed doors.
| 31 | 8 | "Secret Underground" | May 17, 2014 |
Americans may be aware of what's above ground, but do they know what's concealed beneath? And could subterranean facilities on U.S. soil house secrets so dangerous, our government would stop at nothing to keep them hidden? We examine the tunnels, cities, and fortresses covertly constructed beneath the feet of the American public.
| 32 | 9 | "The Secret Service" | May 24, 2014 |
They are an elite force of brave men and women who put their lives on the line. Their mission: to guard the most powerful person in the world. But just who are these American heroes? And what secrets are they protecting? This episode goes inside one of the most top-secret law enforcement agencies in the United States.
| 33 | 10 | "America's Doomsday Plan" | May 31, 2014 |
An atomic attack... cyber warfare... a deadly airborne virus... the list of doomsday scenarios facing the United States has shaken the American psyche. But what is the government doing to protect the nation from ultimate disaster? This episode takes an in-depth look at the impending threats facing our world today. With the Doomsday Clock set to 5 minutes before midnight, is the end of the world looming just around the corner? And could our lack of preparation force us to make the ultimate choice: who will live and who will die? Survivalist Tim Ralston talks about the threat of an Electromagnetic Pulse (EMP) and the devastating impact it could have on the entire world. Ronald Kessler describes the cyber command center and current state of cyber warfare. Bill Kristol discusses the continuity of government and secret bunkers that would be used in the event of a catastrophic attack.

=== Season 4 (2021) ===
| No. overall | No. in season | Title | Original release date |
|---|---|---|---|
| 34 | 1 | "The Secret Space Program" | May 11, 2021 |
On December 20, 2019, the newest branch of the armed services was established--Space Force. Does the U.S. has a much greater presence in space than the public is aware? Could we even have occupied bases on the Moon and Mars?
| 35 | 2 | "Protecting the President" | May 18, 2021 |
The United States has experienced four presidential assassinations, and two more assassination attempts nearly succeeded. But how many more occur that never reach the public? And how far do we go to protect the commander in chief?
| 36 | 3 | "The Freemason Factor" | May 25, 2021 |
Freemasons. What is it that they don't want the public to know? Is there a secret masonic plan just waiting to be triggered--and what would that plan be?
| 37 | 4 | "FBI vs. MLK" | June 8, 2021 |
In 1962, Martin Luther King Jr. criticized Hoover's FBI for refusing to prosecute white supremacists who had burned down black churches in Albany, Georgia. Hoover took King's criticisms in the press as a personal insult. It was an offense that Hoover would never forget and led to him calling King "the most notorious liar in the country." J. Edgar Hoover was not a man to let things go. He ordered "his bureau" to investigate King and soon discovered that the civil rights activist was associated with something he--at the height of the Cold War--considered far more dangerous to the security of the nation than peaceful protests: Communism.
| 38 | 5 | "The Hunt for Hitler's Relics" | June 15, 2021 |
With a notorious interest in the occult, Adolf Hitler forms a Nazi organization known as the Ahnenerbe to acquire holy relics that could help him secure his proposed Thousand-Year Reich, but the Ahnenerbe's success remains a mystery.
| 39 | 6 | "Inside Area 51" | June 22, 2021 |
After decades of secrecy, denials, and cover-ups-the CIA declassified documents that acknowledged the existence of a top-secret military research facility known as Area 51
| 40 | 7 | "Doomsday Scenarios" | June 29, 2021 |
From the "designated survivor" to the Mount Weather Emergency Operations Centre and FEMA catastrophe protocols, what plans does the United States government have in place to deal with a major attack or catastrophic event?
| 41 | 8 | "Mind Control" | July 6, 2021 |
While it may sound like science fiction, numerous government-run mind control programs have been documented, with names like MK Ultra, Project Artichoke, and Project Monarch.
| 42 | 9 | "Alien Disclosure" | July 13, 2021 |
Are governments around the world preparing mankind for the most startling event in human history--the official disclosure of extraterrestrial contact?
| 43 | 10 | "Deadly Pandemics" | July 20, 2021 |
COVID-19 effectively shut down the entire world--and in the process, elevated pandemics to the most important issue across the globe.
