= The UnXplained =

- Genre: Non fiction Television documentary
- Presented by: William Shatner
- Country of origin: United States
- Original language: English
- No. of seasons: 8
- No. of episodes: 107

Production
- Producers: William Shatner; Kevin Burns; Susan Levanthal; Kim Egan; Rob O'Brien
- Running time: 60 minutes
- Production company: Prometheus Entertainment

Original release
- Network: History Channel
- Release: July 19, 2019 – present

Related
- Weird or What? The UnBelievable with Dan Aykroyd

The UnXplained is a television series on History which is promoted as “offering credible answers to questions about mysterious phenomena.” Segments include claims of supernatural or paranormal events, historical mysteries, lost treasures, research into fringe science and new technologies, famous missing persons cases, unsolved crimes, notorious murders and cults, medical oddities or other curiosities.

The show is hosted and executive produced by William Shatner, and also features various authors and academics who discuss given topics. It premiered on July 19, 2019, and has aired for eight seasons.

== Background ==
On March 27, 2019, History greenlit The UnXplained hosted and executive produced by William Shatner and ordered an initial six episodes. The show is produced by Prometheus Entertainment. Kevin Burns and Susan Leventhal also executive produced the first season. History later increased the episode order to an eight episode first season. It premiered July 19, 2019. After the first season History ordered another 20 episodes. The show interviews scientists, historians, engineers, witnesses, and researchers about various "mysterious" topics.

Season one appeared on Netflix in June 2022. Netflix was rumored to be considering ordering season five of The UnXplained, but History Channel picked up the show for a fifth season. The History Channel renewed the program for a 6th season on October 6, 2023. The 7th season premiered on October 4, 2024, followed by the 8th season on January 16, 2026.

== Episodes ==
Sources for the episode lists below can be found here.

=== Series overview ===
Season	Episodes	Originally released	
Season	Episodes	First released	Last released
1	16	July 19, 2019	April 25, 2020
2	18	July 11, 2020	April 16, 2021
3	7	November 5, 2021	December 17, 2021
4	22	April 1, 2022	December 16, 2022
5	10	March 31, 2023	June 16, 2023
6	10	October 6, 2023	December 22, 2023
7	18	October 4, 2024	October 31, 2025
8	18	January 16, 2026	August 28, 2026

=== Season 1 (2019–20) ===
No. overall	No. in season	Title	Original release date
1	1	"Evil Places"	July 19, 2019
Aokigahara forest, Dyatlov Pass incident, Lake Shawnee Amusement Park, Willow's Weep haunted house (Cayuga, Indiana), La Ciudad Blanca Notable Cast: David Ono, George Noory, Travis S. Taylor, Loyd Auerbach, Douglas Preston, Steve Elkins
2	2	"Mysterious Structures"	July 26, 2019
Lalibela, Loretto Chapel, Winchester Mystery House, Coral Castle, Pyramid of Giza, Wardenclyffe Tower, Stone spheres of Costa Rica
3	3	"Strange Creatures"	August 2, 2019
Cryptids, Thylacine, Chupacabra, Mexican Coywolf, Goatman, Vladimir Demikhov, Mothman, Thunderbird, Teratorns, Coelacanths, Mongolian death worm
4	4	"Unnatural Nature"	August 9, 2019
Catatumbo lightning, Lightning injury, Centralia mine fire, Crooked Forest, Windsor Hum, Devils Tower, Old Faithful, Yellowstone supervolcano
5	5	"Bizarre Rituals"	August 16, 2019
San Pedro Manrique Firewalking, Voodoo, UFC 229, roman gladiators, bullfighting, exorcisms, 2018 Western Wall drought prayers, prayer, Torajan funeral rites
6	6	"Life Beyond Death"	August 23, 2019
Near-death experiences, Organ transplant personality changes, Twin study, reincarnation, Reiki
7	7	"Mysteries of the Mind"	August 30, 2019
Sensitive period of language acquisition, Phineas Gage, child prodigy, acquired savant syndrome, psychopathic brains, remote viewing, Stargate Project, mind uploading, universal consciousness, false memory implantation
8	8	"Incredible Survivors"	September 6, 2019
9	9	"The Oak Island Curse"	February 29, 2020
Oak Island
10	10	"Dark Prophecies"	March 7, 2020
11	11	"Lost Civilizations"	March 14, 2020
12	12	"Deadly Cults"	March 21, 2020
NXIVM, importance of the cult's charismatic leader, Jim Jones of Jonestown, James Arthur Ray, Marshall Applewhite of Heaven's Gate, Butoh and the death of Sharon Stern, Altamira child emasculations
13	13	"Extreme Weather Mysteries"	March 28, 2020
Tornado, ball lightning, blood rain, rain of animals, weather modification, St. Louis Arch, HAARP, Eero Saarinen
14	14	"Mysterious Stones"	April 11, 2020
Black Stone of Mecca, Mitchell-Hedges crystal skull, Koh-i-Noor, Stone of Scone, the sword in the stone of Galgano Guidotti, statue of Tlāloc
15	15	"Vampires and Werewolves"	April 18, 2020
16	16	"Amazing Animal Abilities"	April 25, 2020
Sergeant Reckless, equine-assisted therapy, canine cancer detection, Greyfriars Bobby, cetacean intelligence, birds detecting storms with infrasound, cat intelligence, machine olfaction

=== Season 2 (2020–21) ===
No. overall	No. in season	Title	Original release date
17	1	"The Greatest Escapes"	July 11, 2020
18	2	"Superhuman Senses"	July 18, 2020
19	3	"Mysterious Curses"	July 25, 2020
20	4	"The Truth About UFOs"	August 1, 2020
21	5	"The Underground World"	August 8, 2020
22	6	"Leading Double Lives"	August 15, 2020
23	7	"Mysteries of the Bible"	January 1, 2021
24	8	"Mysterious Mummies"	January 8, 2021
25	9	"Secrets of America's Monuments"	January 15, 2021
26	10	"The Search for Atlantis"	January 22, 2021
27	11	"Extraordinary Engineering"	January 29, 2021
28	12	"The Power of Gold"	February 19, 2021
29	13	"The Truth About Bigfoot"	February 26, 2021
30	14	"Bizarre Vanishings"	March 5, 2021
31	15	"Serial Killers"	March 12, 2021
32	16	"The Mystery of Plagues"	April 2, 2021
33	17	"Mysteries of the Moon"	April 9, 2021
34	18	"Outrageous Robberies"	April 16, 2021

=== Season 3 (2021–22) ===
No. overall	No. in season	Title	Original release date
35	1	"The Hunt for Hidden Treasures"	November 5, 2021
36	2	"Satanic Encounters"	November 12, 2021
37	3	"The Search for the Ark of the Covenant"	November 19, 2021
38	4	"Apocalypse When?"	November 26, 2021
39	5	"Secrets of the Immortals"	December 3, 2021
40	6	"Sacred Bones"	December 10, 2021
41	7	"Mysteries of Mars"	December 17, 2021

=== Season 4 (2022–23) ===
No. overall	No. in season	Title	Original release date
42	1	"Mysterious Ancient Ruins"	April 1, 2022
43	2	"The Mystery of Genius"	April 1, 2022
44	3	"What Lies Below?"	April 8, 2022
45	4	"Secrets of Abandoned Places"	April 15, 2022
46	5	"Acts of God"	April 22, 2022
47	6	"Serial Killer Creatures"	May 6, 2022
48	7	"Mysterious Tombs"	May 13, 2022
49	8	"Uncanny Curses"	May 20, 2022
50	9	"Superhuman Feats"	May 27, 2022
51	10	"Mysteries of the Missing Link"	June 3, 2022
52	11	"Surviving the Impossible"	June 10, 2022
53	12	"The Search for King Arthur"	June 24, 2022
54	13	"Wonders of the Ancient World"	October 7, 2022
55	14	"The Hunt for Jack the Ripper"	October 14, 2022
56	15	"The Search for Extraterrestrial Life"	October 21, 2022
57	16	"Real Life Monsters"	October 28, 2022
58	17	"America's Lost Treasures"	November 4, 2022
59	18	"The Bermuda Triangle and the Beyond"	November 18, 2022
60	19	"Secrets of the Founding Fathers"	November 25, 2022
61	20	"The Weird Wild West"	December 2, 2022
62	21	"Devastating Disasters"	December 9, 2022
63	22	"Mysterious Monoliths"	December 16, 2022

=== Season 5 (2023) ===
No. overall	No. in season	Title	Original release date
64	1	"Lost Cities"	March 31, 2023
65	2	"Tales of the Dearly Departed"	April 7, 2023
66	3	"Curses Unleashed"	April 14, 2023
67	4	"Earth's Unsolved Mysteries"	April 21, 2023
68	5	"The Power of Prophecy"	May 5, 2023
69	6	"Mysterious Monsters"	May 12, 2023
70	7	"Sacred Rituals"	May 19, 2023
71	8	"UFO Hotspots"	June 2, 2023
72	9	"Extraordinary Structures"	June 9, 2023
73	10	"Holy Relics"	June 16, 2023

=== Season 6 (2023) ===
No. overall	No. in season	Title	Original release date
74	1	"The World Beneath Our Feet"	October 6, 2023
75	2	"The Time Travelers"	October 13, 2023
76	3	"Secrets of Ancient Structures"	October 20, 2023
77	4	"Mysteries of the Vikings"	November 3, 2023
78	5	"Strange Stories of the Presidents"	November 10, 2023
79	6	"Bizarre Afflictions"	November 17, 2023
80	7	"Strange Technology"	December 1, 2023
81	8	"Unbreakable Codes"	December 8, 2023
82	9	"Strange Stories of WW II"	December 15, 2023
83	10	"Monsters Among Us"	December 22, 2023

=== Season 7 (2024) ===
No. overall	No. in season	Title	Original release date
84	1	"The Golden Age of Pirates"	October 4, 2024
85	2	"Impossible Ancient Inventions"	October 11, 2024
86	3	"The Lost"	October 18, 2024
87	4	"Alien Contagion"	October 25, 2024
88	5	"Ancient Bible Relics"	November 1, 2024
89	6	"Islands of the Damned"	November 8, 2024
90	7	"Tales from Antarctica"	June 6, 2025
91	8	"Robot Revolution"	June 13, 2025
92	9	"Secret Societies"	June 20, 2025
93	10	"Secrets of the Spies"	June 27, 2025
94	11	"Secrets of the Civil War"	July 11, 2025
95	12	"Mysterious Urban Legends"	July 18, 2025
96	13	"Mad Scientists"	July 25, 2025
97	14	"Strange Tales from the American Frontier"	August 1, 2025
98	15	"Terrors of the Deep"	October 3, 2025
99	16	"Unlocking the Sixth Sense"	October 10, 2025
100	17	"The World's Deadliest Assassins"	October 17, 2025
101	18	"Mysteries of the Underground"	October 31, 2025

=== Season 8 (2026) ===
}}

No. overall	No. in season	Title	Original release date
102	1	"Impossible Ancient Structures"	January 16, 2026
103	2	"Nightmares and Dreams"	January 23, 2026
104	3	"Unnatural Disasters"	January 30, 2026
105	4	"Mysteries of Africa"	February 13, 2026
106	5	"Mind over Matter"	February 20, 2026
107	6	"Mighty Kingdoms Unearthed"	February 27, 2026
108	7	"Dangerous Places"	May 29, 2026
109	8	"Satan's Army"	June 5, 2026
110	9	"Top Secret Projects"	June 12, 2026
111	10	"Mystery of the Dinosaurs"	June 26, 2026
112	11	"The Lost World of the Aztecs"	July 10, 2026
113	12	"Objects of Power"	July 17, 2026
114	13	"Unnerving Nature"	July 24, 2026
115	14	"Deadly Ancient Curses"	July 31, 2026
116	15	"Alien Close Encounters"	August 7, 2026
117	16	"Secrets of the Pyramids"	August 14, 2026
118	17	"Buried Mysteries"	August 21, 2026
119	18	"Human Anomalies"	August 28, 2026

== Critical reception ==
=== Media reviews ===
Common Sense Media reviewer Melissa Camacho gave the show 3 out of 5 stars, saying, "The documentary series offers lots of intriguing narratives about peculiar practices, extraordinary moments, and fantastical events in history that may or may not be explained away by science". According to Camacho, explanations by spiritualists and paranormal believers are often presented in a way that is "much more captivating than the academic studies and objective evidence being offered", and that "skeptics will find much of what The UnXplained has to offer hard to take seriously".

Rory Mellon of Tom's Guide wrote that the show had reached the top 10 streamed shows on Netflix. According to Mellon, "The UnXplained covers an awful lot of ground, some of it not particularly solid either". Mellon warned, "the show doesn’t really offer up a lot of concrete answers, but if you can just enjoy the sense of mystery, then you’ll likely be hooked by this strangely watchable series."

Writing in Irish Film Critic, Thomas Tunstall gave the series 3.5 out of 5 stars, and reported that the show's "subject matter runs all over the board", as if designed for an audience with attention deficit disorder. Though Shatner enthusiastically poses many questions, he provides far fewer satisfactory answers than he should – perhaps by design in order to retain the sense of mystery." Despite feeling disjointed, Tunstall called Shatner's presentation of content "captivating" thanks to his "irrefutable acting chops and narrative gravitas".

Stuff critic Sarah McMullan called the show "evil fun", writing that it only features opinions from experts and others "who believe in evil". McMullan reviewed the show's segments, saying they emphasized evil as a factor, ignored science, and became increasingly "sillier", quipping, "Honestly, you couldn't write this stuff".

=== Academic reviews ===
Professor Sarah Parcak criticized the show's presentation of archaeology. She labeled it as "horribly racist"; and wrote "as it turns out, 'A great archaeological mystery' is a code phrase for 'We are too lazy to read or even Google and honestly, racism is far easier than admitting non white people were/are brilliant innovators.'"

Jason Colavito criticized the show, calling it "recycled material from Prometheus Entertainment’s other nonsense fake science shows" where the host "goes hunting for lost continents and sunken civilizations". According to Colavito, "Not a word is spoken about the many hoaxes and frauds that undergird the show’s claims".

== Popular culture ==
The Lake Shawnee Amusement Park reported an increase in attendance after being featured on the show.
