= High Maintenance 90210 =

- Genre: Reality Television
- Created by: Jack Lippman
- Country of origin: United States
- No. of seasons: 1
- No. of episodes: 8

Production
- Executive producers: Kevin Burns; Jonathan Sheinberg; David Osper; Jack Lippman; Brent Zacky
- Running time: 22 minutes

Original release
- Network: E!
- Release: January 1 – February 12, 2007

High Maintenance 90210 is an American reality series that premiered on the E!: Entertainment Television network on January 1, 2007.

== Synopsis ==
The show follows a group of Beverly Hills butlers, nannies, and chefs as they perform a variety of jobs for a very selective and wealthy clientele. Various clients contact Jack Lippman, owner of the Elizabeth Rose Agency, who sends out potential employees to the homes of the clients. Each employee attempts to meet the demands of their extremely picky clients in hopes of earning a permanent position.

== Cast ==
- Jack Lippman - Owner of the Elizabeth Rose Agency
- Julie Swales - Head of the Elizabeth Rose Agency's nanny division
- Marcel Cicot - Personal chef
- Brian Armstrong - Butler
- Lucy Treadway - Nanny
- Norwood Young - R&B singer, employed Brian Armstrong as his personal butler
- Christina Fulton - Actress looking for a personal assistant

== Episodes ==
No.	Title	Original release date
1	"High Maintenance 90210"	January 1, 2007
2	"The Frying Game"	January 8, 2007
3	"Ghetto Blasted"	January 29, 2007
4	"Stand by Your Manny"	February 5, 2007
5	"Ready to Crumble"	February 6, 2007
6	"Personal Insistence"	February 9, 2007
7	"May the Best Nan Win"	February 9, 2007
8	"Pauly Wanna Cracker?"	February 12, 2007
