= Molly Shock =

American film editor

- Occupation: Film editor

Molly Shock is an American film and television film editor, a two-time ACE Award nominee and a two-time Emmy Award nominee. She is a member of American Cinema Editors. and serves on the board of directors for the Motion Picture Editors Guild.

== Early life and education ==
Shock earned a B.A. in communications from Loyola Marymount University in Los Angeles, California. Her first job was at Davis-Glick Productions.

== Career ==
Shock has worked on Project Runway, Survivor, Top Chef, Last Comic Standing, Skin Wars and Swamp People. Her work has been shown on NBC, ABC, History Channel and Lifetime.

Shock's first Primetime Emmy Award nomination was in 2005 for "Outstanding Sound Editing for Nonfiction Programming (Single or Multi-Camera)", for the TV show, Empire of Dreams: The Story of the 'Star Wars' Trilogy. Her second Primetime Emmy Award nomination for "Outstanding Picture Editing for Reality Programming" was in 2012 for the TV show Project Runway.

Shock's first ACE Award ("Eddie") nomination for "Best Edited Reality Series" was for the TV show Expedition Africa, "Stanley and Livingstone". She earned her second ACE Award nomination in 2012 for "Best Edited Reality Series" for the TV show Beyond Scared Straight, "Chowchilla".
