= The Unexplained (magazine) =

British partwork magazine

The Unexplained: Mysteries of Mind, Space, & Time was a popular partwork magazine published by Orbis Publishing in the United Kingdom, between 1980 and 1983. It ran to 156 issues, with issue 157 being an index to the collection, and dealt with the paranormal and mysteries such as UFOs, the Bermuda Triangle, ghosts, spontaneous human combustion, the Cottingley Fairies, ancient knowledge, sea monsters, the Yeti, weird coincidences, stone circles, contact with the dead, and notable historical characters linked to the occult. The magazine was published as a journal, with page numbering continuing from one edition to the next. When the magazine ceased publication, a refund was offered if the consumer returned the covers.

The magazine was edited by Peter Brookesmith, and consultants included Dr. J. Allen Hynek and Professor A. J. Ellison. The editorial director was Brian Innes, who had previously worked on Man, Myth & Magic: An Illustrated Encyclopedia of the Supernatural.

A complementary version was published in France, entitled L'Inexpliqué, which contained differently written articles. This series was published in 8 to 26 volumes, depending on whether the edition were British or French.

The partwork, which debuted on newsstands the same year the British TV series Arthur C. Clarke's Mysterious World (1980) was first broadcast, was hugely popular.

== Book reissues ==
Articles from the magazine were later published in book form during the late 1980s by various publishers, including Black Cat, Caxton, and St. Michael's books. Titles included: When the Impossible Happens (1984) and Out of this World: Mysteries of Mind, Space, & Time (1989).

=== Titles in the series ===
There were 26 volumes in the series:

- Volume 1: Acupuncture; Zigmund Jan Adamski; Alchemy; Alien Contacts; Sergeant Alkemade; Alternative Healing; American Kangaroos; American Lake Monsters; American Serpents; and Anastasia.
- Volume 2: Ancient Astronauts; Ancient Gods; Ancient Technology; Andromeda Strain; Angels of Mons; Animal Intelligence; Anthropic Principle; Appearances; Eugene Aram; Ardachie Lodge; Jose Arigo; and Astrology.
- Volume 3: Atlantis; Sai Baba; Ball Lightning; Barbados Coffins; Beast of Gevaudan; Comyns Beaumont; Bermuda Triangle; Bible Mysteries; Biorythms; Black Dogs; Black Holes; and Black Madonnas.
- Volume 4: Madame Blavatsky; Borley Rectory; Adrian Boshier; Brahan Seer; British Scareships; John Cain; Campden Wonder; Cash-Landrum Case; Catastrophe Theory; Alien Cats; Edgar Cayce; Celtic Heads; Cergy-Pontoise Affair; Chanctonbury Ring; George Chapman; Christ's Tomb; and Clapham Wood.
- Volume 5: 'Against all reason'; Poltergeists; Extrasensory perception; Faith healing; Remote viewing; Psychokinesis; Telepathy; Society for Psychical Research; Experimenter Effect; Science and the Mind.
- Volume 6: Aleister Crowley; Geraldine Cummins; Death Valley; John Dee; Delayed Death Touch; Demonic UFOs; Gilles DeRais; Prieure De Sion; Devil's Footprints; Dinosaurs; Disappearances; and Divination.
- Volume 7: Dowsing; Dragons; Dreams; Lord Dufferin; Helen Duncan; Dyfed Enigma; Earth Lights; Mysteries of Egypt; Electric People; and Electric Voice Phenomena.
- Volume 8: End Times; Enfield Poltergeist; ESP; Executive ESP; Gambling ESP; On test ESP; and Eva C.
- Volume 9: Evolution; Existence of God; Experimenter Effect; Extra-Terrestrial Intelligence; Fact Follows Fiction; Demons and Alien Fairies; Fantasy-Prone Personalities; Fireproof People; Fish Falls; Fishpond Enigma; Leslie Flint; and Flying Dutchman.
- Volume 10: Charles Fort; Forteana; Fox Sisters; French Prophet; Freud and Psi; Fulcanelli; Eileen Garrett; Ghosts; Rose Gladden; and Glastonbury.
- Volume 11: Glastonbury Scripts; Joan Grant; Great Hauntings; Great Lakes Triangle; Valentine Greatrakes; Green Children; Gurdjieff; Hanging Rock; and Kasper Hauser.
- Volume 12: Betty and Barney Hill; Hollow Earth; Holy Blood, Holy Grail; D. D. Home; Judge Hornby; Houdini; Humanoids; Peter Hurkos; and Hypnosis.
- Volume 13: Ice Ages; Ilkley Rocks; Images that Bleed and Weep; Icorruptible Corpses; Indian Rope Trick; Inspiration and Genius; Iridology; Irish Lake Monsters; Isle of Wight; Jinxes and Curses; Joan of Arc; Jung and Psi; King Arthur; and Katie King.
- Volume 14: Kirlian Photography; Kubler-Ross; Labyrinths, Mazes and Spirals; John "Babacombe" Lee; Left and Right Brain; Tom Lethbridge; Eliphas Levi; Levitation; Leys; Lightning Calculators; Lines of Alaise; and Live Burials.
- Volume 15: Loch Ness Monster; Raymond Lodge; Long Island Horror; Lost Civilizations; Lyonesse; Mammoths; Mysterious Man-Beasts; Man in the Iron Mask; Man-Made UFOs; and Matthew Manning.
- Volume 16: Mars; Mary Celeste; Mass Hysteria; Meier Case; Men in Black; Merfolk; Mind and Brain; Mind Over Matter; Mirabelli; Miracle Cures; Moon Mysteries; and Multiple Personalities.
- Volume 17: Natural Oddities; Nazca; Nazi Occult; Neanderthal Man; Joan Norkot; Isa Northage; No-War Prophecies; Numbers; Oak Island Money Pit; Observation Theories; Occult Chemistry; Occult Revival; and Old New World.
- Volume 18: Harry Oldfield; Once Upon a Time; Origins of Life; Origins of Man; Other Dimensions; Out-of-the-Body Experiences; Oz Factor; Pachita; Eusapia Palladino; Future of Parapsychology; Perpetual Motion; Phaeton; Phantom Hitch-Hiker; Philadelphia Experiment; and Physical Mediums.
- Volume 19: Physics and Psi; Pied Piper; Pluto; Edgar Allan Poe; Pole Reversal; Coral Polge; Poltergeists; Pope Joan; Prester John; Harry Price; Priddy Project; Princes in the Tower; and Psychic Art.
- Volume 20: Psychic Dentistry; Psychic Surgery; Psychic UFOs; Psychics; Andrija Puharich; Queenie Nixon; Radionics; Wilhelm Reich; Reincarnated Twins; Rennes-le-Chateau; Ripper Murders; Rituals of Magic; Robin Hood; and William Roy.
- Volume 21: Ruth and Reality; R101 Disaster; Sacred Geometry; Émilie Sagée; Count of St. Germain; St Medard; St Theresa of Lisieux; Willi and Rudi Schneider; Sea Monsters; Sensitive Plants; Ted Serios; Sex and Psi; Shamanism; Sadhu Sundar Singh; and Sirius B.
- Volume 22: Society for Psychical Research; Solelectrics; Sorrat; Joanna Soutchott; Soviet Psi; Speaking in Tongues; Spiritism; Spirit Photography; Spontaneous Human Combustion; Spring-Heeled Jack; Standing Stones; Stigmatics; and Doris Stokes.
- Volume 23: Strange Nature; Subud; Sun; Survival of Death; Swedenborg; Swiss Dream Case; Swiss Metal Bender; Talking Mongoose; Tantric Cults; Teleportation; Tesla; Robert Thouless; Time; and Time Loops.
- Volume 24: Timeslips; Toads; Trulli of Alberobello; Return of the Tudors; Tulpas; Tunguska Explosion; Turin Shroud; Twins; UFO Cover-up; and UFO cults.
- Volume 25: Ummo; Unidentified Submarine Objects; Vampires; Edgar Vandy; Velikovsky; Visions of the Virgin Mary; Von Mehesz's Machine; Voodoo; Voynich Manuscript; Vulcan; Helen Wambach; Weird China; and Weird Winged Creatures.
- Volume 26: Welsh Lights; Werewolves; Whisperers; William Rufus; Margo Williams; Window Areas; Witches of Bottesford; Witches of Salem; Origins of Zodiac; Zombies; and Index.
