= Peter Gersten =

American attorney (born 1942)

Peter Alan Gersten
- Born: 1942 (age 83–84)
- Occupation: Lawyer
- Known for: UFO litigation
- Movement: Disclosure movement

Peter Gersten (born 1942) is an American attorney known for his representation of UFO claimants including Betty Cash and Vickie Landrum; J. Allen Hynek; and others. In retirement, Gersten has been an unofficial hiking docent in Sedona, Arizona, where he volunteers to lead frequent excursions to Bell Rock.

Gersten has worked in the Brooklyn District Attorney's office; the Navajo County, Arizona Public Defender's Office; and as a partner at the New York law firm of Rothblatt, Rothblatt, Seijas, and Peskin.

== Early life and education ==
Born 1942, Gersten graduated from Brooklyn Law School and was admitted to the New York State Bar in 1971.

== Career ==
Early in his career, Gersten worked as a prosecutor in the Brooklyn District Attorney's office. In 1972, he prosecuted three inmates at the Brooklyn House of Detention for the murder of fellow inmate Louis Olivares, despite jail officials, the Office of Chief Medical Examiner of the City of New York, and the New York Police Department (NYPD) all ruling the death a suicide. During the course of the trial, Gersten acknowledged that, as a prosecutor, he was "young and inexperienced" and that the case should not have been brought. The three inmates were acquitted and Gersten resigned his office and entered private practice as a partner at the New York law firm of Rothblatt, Rothblatt, Seijas, and Peskin.

- The trial of Lee Walker
- "ADA Anthony Schepis, Judge Barry Salman, Lee Walker, Lincoln Hosp. Doctor, Def. Att. Peter Gersten" by Ida Libby Dengrove (courtroom sketch)
- image icon

Gersten's later law practice focused on criminal defense. In 1985, he represented Lee Ernest Walker in his trial for the murder of NYPD officer Juan Andino.

By the 1990s, Gersten had moved to Arizona, where he worked in the Navajo County Public Defender's Office. He later retired to Sedona.

=== UFO litigation ===
Gersten has been referred to as "the UFO lawyer". He became interested in UFOs as a child and, during his law career, devoted a large amount of time to UFO-related litigation. In the 1980s he set-up a UFO hotline in area code 914 where callers could leave a recorded message detailing their supposed UFO sightings and other callers could hear recently recorded messages. Gersten claimed to witness the so-called Hudson Valley UFO sightings.

On January 8, 1999, Gersten joined Stephen Bassett, Steven Greer, Richard C. Hoagland, William Birnes, and Jim Marrs as a guest on Coast to Coast AM with Art Bell to discuss the topic of "UFO disclosure". Gersten appears in the 2013 documentary Mirage Men, which puts forth the idea that UFO mythology was seeded into the public imagination by the U.S. armed forces to provide cover for classified military projects.

==== Ground Saucer Watch lawsuit ====
In 1977, Gersten represented the UFO group Ground Saucer Watch (GSW) in a FOIA filing, and subsequent lawsuit, against the CIA, for documents GSW alleged they held about UFOs. Gersten had contacted several UFO groups offering his legal counsel pro bono but, according to him, only GSW responded. GSW's interest in seeking UFO records from the CIA was inspired by a recently-joined member, W. Todd Zechel, who alleged he had worked in covert roles for the U.S. Government and was aware of the suppression of UFO evidence by the U.S. Intelligence Community. In response to Gersten's initial FOIA request, the CIA promptly proposed to Gersten to "search their complete files, when they didn't have to" leaving the attorney surprised. While the agency released nearly 900 pages of files, approximately 50 potentially responsive pages were withheld, which Gersten successfully sued to declassify.

Philip Klass characterized the released files as non-extraordinary in nature. According to Skeptical Inquirer, addressing the matter of the 50 withheld pages, these were apparently retained primarily due to the potential they might reveal surveillance capabilities rather than any information about UFOs. For example, Skeptical Inquirer noted, "there was one instance in which the CIA listened in on a Cuban Air Force pilot discussing a UFO sighting. The problem wasn’t the UFO sighting; it was that we didn’t want the Cubans to know we’d been able to listen in on their pilots’ conversations".

External videos
- Interviews of Peter Gersten
- Gersten interviewed in 1981 by Tom Snyder
- Gersten interviewed in 2007 by Paul Kimball

==== Other litigation ====
In 1977 Gersten co-founded, with Zechel, Citizens Against UFO Secrecy. Gersten also provided legal representation to J. Allen Hynek.

In the mid-1980s, he unsuccessfully represented Betty Cash and Vickie Landrum in their $20 million lawsuit against the United States Government for injuries they claimed to have suffered during their alleged 1980 UFO encounter.

Following the 1997 publication of The Day After Roswell, Gersten — on behalf of Citizens Against UFO Secrecy — sued the United States Government seeking release of documents alleging UFO retrieval described by author Philip Corso. The lawsuit was dismissed by Roslyn O. Silver of the U.S. District Court for the District of Arizona in April 1999.

In 1999, Gersten threatened to sue Winston over copy to an ad the cigarette company ran that read "If aliens are smart enough to travel to space, why do they keep abducting the dumbest people on Earth?"

== Personal life ==
In a 1984 story on Gersten for the Reporter Dispatch, columnist David Bushman described him as "a cool-looking character — blue shades, shirt unbuttoned to the chest, tie untied. The kind of guy who struts into his Tarrytown law office, briefcase in hand, as if he just flew in from California and has a plane waiting to take him somewhere across the world. He kept making phone calls in the middle of the interview". A 1988 story on Gersten by Associated Press reporter David Bauder noted he drove a Porsche with the vanity license plate "UFOSREAL".

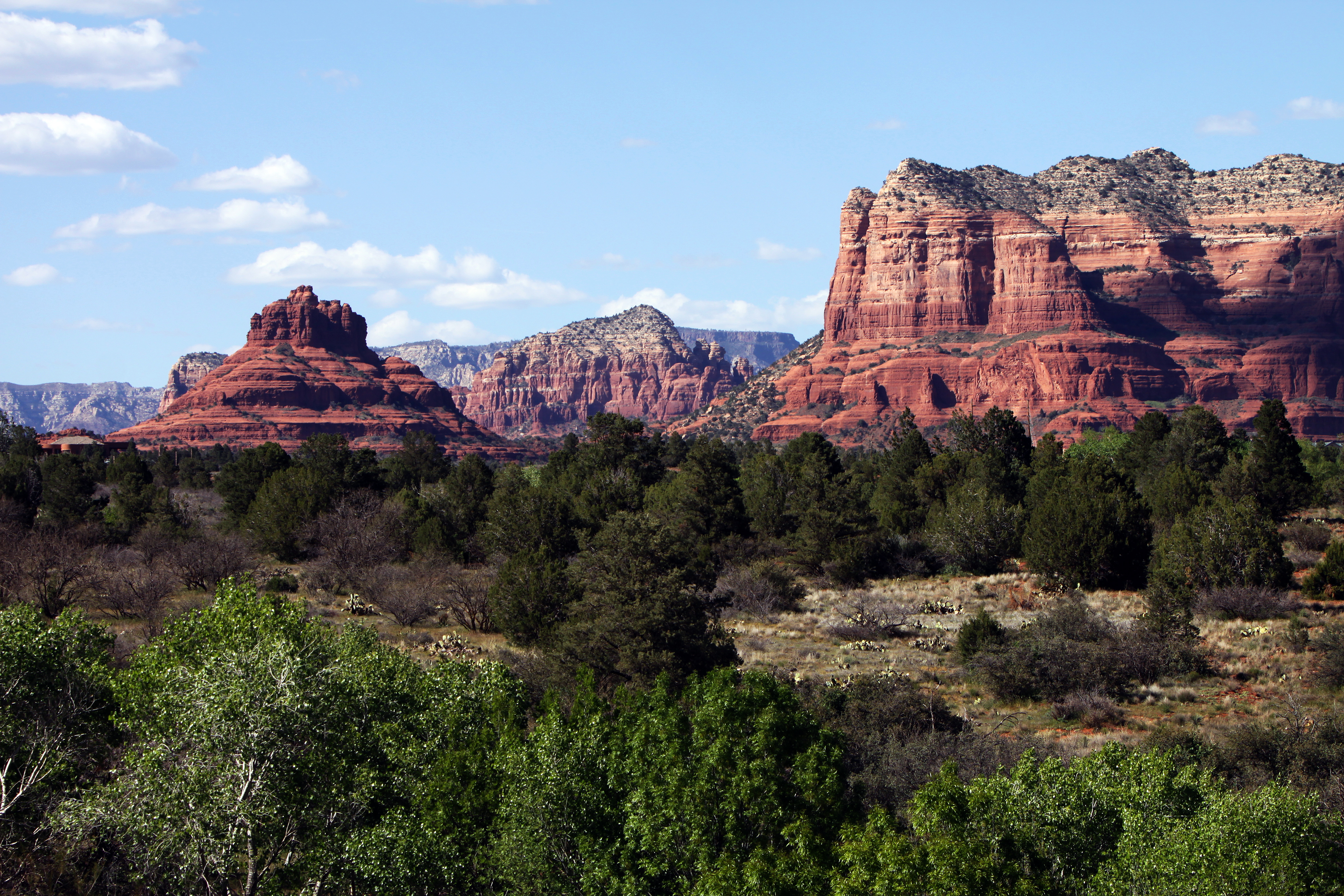
Gersten frequently climbs Arizona's Bell Rock (pictured).

=== Top of Bell Rock Club ===
After retirement, Gersten became involved in the CouchSurfing community. According to an interview with the company's blog, he hosts visitors who agree to climb with him to the top of Arizona's Bell Rock in an unofficial group known as the "Top of Bell Rock Club".

During the 2012 Winter Solstice, Gersten announced his intent to enter an interdimensional vortex he believed would materialize at Bell Rock. When the vortex failed to materialize, he "returned to his Earthly home in Sedona", according to the Yavapai County Sheriff's Office.

As of 2016, according to an article in the Northern Arizona University student newspaper The Lumberjack, Gersten — then 74 years old — was leading an average of four hikes to Bell Rock each week and, by the following year, had inducted more than 2,000 people into membership in his Top of Bell Rock Club.

== See also ==
- Daniel Sheehan (attorney)
