= UFO Magazine =

American magazine dedicated to UFOs, extraterrestrials, and paranormal phenomenon

- Issue 1
- Categories: unidentified flying objects (UFOs), the extraterrestrial hypothesis (ETH), as well as paranormal and Fortean subjects in general
- Frequency: initially published quarterly, then monthly, then bi-monthly, then erratically for several years
- Founder: Vicki Ecker and Sherie Stark
- Founded: 1986; 40 years ago
- Final issue Number: 2012; 14 years ago Volume 24, No. 5, Issue #158 (2012)
- Country: United States
- Language: English
- Website: www.ufomag.com

UFO Magazine was an American magazine that was devoted to the subject of unidentified flying objects (UFOs), the extraterrestrial hypothesis (ETH), as well as paranormal and Fortean subjects in general.

== History and profile ==
UFO Magazine (USA) was founded in 1986 by journalists Vicki Ecker and Sherie Stark, and its contents remained under their stewardship for over a decade with the help of Vicki Ecker's husband, Research Director Don Ecker. For several years after that, it was published by Bill Birnes and edited by his wife, Nancy Hayfield Birnes. With the term "UFO" trademarked in 1998, UFO Magazine was initially published quarterly, then monthly, then bi-monthly, then erratically for several years. It was one of the few magazines in print primarily devoted to the UFO phenomenon, and the only one that remained in operation for more than a few years.

UFO Magazine was published in the United States and had covered every major breaking UFO story from the disclosure that a Soviet spacecraft had encountered a UFO, to the Apollo astronauts' accounts of an alien presence on the Moon, along with more widely publicized events such as the UFO encounter of a Japanese airliner and the controversial Roswell and Gulf Breeze UFO incidents. It featured columnists such as Stanton T. Friedman, Nick Redfern, Larry Bryant, George Noory, Camille James Harman and Colin Bennett, and included writers such as Ann Druffel, Nigel Watson, and Jaime Maussan, among others. UFO Magazine broke the story of Lieutenant Colonel Philip J. Corso's revelations about his involvement in the research of extraterrestrial technology recovered from the 1947 Roswell UFO Incident. It also broke the story of Lieutenant Colonel Marion M. Magruder's handling of the Roswell crash debris and face-to-face meeting with the Roswell alien; as well as Colonel Jesse Marcel, Jr., M.D.'s story of the night his father brought the Roswell debris back to his home before taking it to the Roswell Army Air Field.

There were a total of 158 issues. The final issue, Volume 24, No. 5, Issue #158, was published in early 2012.

It was described in J. Gordon Melton's Encyclopedia of Occultism and Parapsychology as "the primary English-language UFO newsstand periodical" and noted they "were not above fabricating stories to fill space". It operated out of Los Angeles.

== See also ==
- List of magazines of anomalous phenomena
- UFO Magazine (UK)
