= The Riverman =

American TV film

- DVD cover
- Based on: The Riverman: Ted Bundy and I Hunt for the Green River Killer by Robert D. Keppel and William J. Birnes
- Teleplay by: Tom Towler
- Directed by: Bill Eagles
- Starring: Bruce Greenwood; Sam Jaeger; Kathleen Quinlan; Cary Elwes
- Music by: Jeff Rona
- Country of origin: United States
- Original language: English

Production
- Executive producers: Hawk Koch; Peter Lance
- Producer: Greg Copeland
- Production location: Halifax, Nova Scotia
- Cinematography: Steve Cosens
- Editors: Conrad Gonzalez; Lynne M. Whitlock
- Running time: 91 minutes
- Production companies: Koch Company; Cinema 21 Group; Fox Television Studios

Original release
- Network: A&E
- Release: September 6, 2004

The Riverman is a 2004 American biographical crime drama television film directed by Bill Eagles and written by Tom Towler, based on the 2004 non-fiction book The Riverman: Ted Bundy and I Hunt for the Green River Killer by Robert D. Keppel and William J. Birnes. Shot in Halifax, Canada, the film stars Bruce Greenwood, Sam Jaeger, Kathleen Quinlan, and Cary Elwes. It premiered on A&E on September 6, 2004. The film follows real life incidents around how convicted infamous serial killer Ted Bundy helps detectives Robert D. Keppel and Dave Reichert by providing insights into the mind of a psychopath killer to catch then active murderer Green River Killer aka Gary Ridgway.

== Plot ==
Robert D. Keppel, a criminology professor at the University of Washington, is approached by Detective Dave Reichert to help profile a serial killer preying on prostitutes in the Seattle, Washington area. Keppel agrees over the objections of his wife Sande, who is tired of him spending more time with crime scene investigations than with her.

Keppel receives a letter from serial killer Ted Bundy, whom Keppel had helped send to death row, offering to "consult" on the case. Keppel conducts a series of interviews with Bundy under the guise of wanting his expertise. In reality, he is hoping that Bundy will reveal details of his own murders before he is executed. Bundy is little help in profiling the killer, whom he dubs "The Riverman", but he does shed light on his own pathology, particularly his need to "possess" his victims, even to the point of necrophilia. Finally, Bundy confesses to several unsolved murders in the vain hope that Keppel will delay his execution.

Meanwhile, Keppel and Reichert question a suspect, Gary Ridgway, and take a DNA sample. Years later, the DNA is used to convict Ridgway of the murders.

== Cast ==
- Bruce Greenwood as Robert D. Keppel
- Sam Jaeger as Dave Reichert
- Kathleen Quinlan as Sande Keppel
- Cary Elwes as Ted Bundy
- Dave Brown as Gary Ridgway
- Sarah Manninen as Georgeann Hawkins
