= The Day After Roswell =

1997 book by Philip J. Corso

- Cover of a 2006 paperback edition
- Author: Philip J. Corso; William J. Birnes
- Subject: Extraterrestrial spacecraft, the Roswell incident
- Publisher: Pocket Books
- Publication date: 1997
- Publication place: United States
- Media type: Tell-all memoir
- ISBN: 0-671-00461-1

The Day After Roswell is a memoir that claims the U.S. government made use of extraterrestrial technology it recovered from the 1947 Roswell incident. It was ghostwritten by William J. Birnes and credited to Philip J. Corso. Published as Corso's tell-all autobiography by Pocket Books in 1997, the book spent three weeks on the New York Times bestseller list and received mixed reviews. Analysts have noted a large number of errors about basic, known facts in the text, as well as chronologically impossible feats the book attributes to Corso. The book has been alleged to be a hoax.

== Background ==
At the time of publication, Philip J. Corso was a former United States Army intelligence officer who had briefly served as deputy chief of the Foreign Technology Division. Corso was born in California, Pennsylvania and was conscripted into the U.S. Army, but received a commission in 1942. In 1963, after holding the rank of lieutenant colonel for 10 years without further promotion and owning a heavily mortgaged home, he resigned to accept a job as a staff assistant to United States Senator Strom Thurmond. He later held a similar post with United States Representative Michael A. Feighan, who recommended him for a job as a professional committee staff member. His hiring was blocked by Rep. Emanuel Celler due to allegations published by Drew Pearson and Jack Anderson in the Washington Post that, according to Corso's own summary of the article in a later libel lawsuit, he was "guilty of misconduct in both military and civilian life, incompetency, unreliability, untruthfulness, and other odious personal traits". Corso's libel lawsuit against Pearson and Anderson was ultimately dismissed due to evolving defamation standards resulting from the contemporaneous U.S. Supreme Court decision in New York Times v. Sullivan. In the 1970s he again worked for Thurmond for a few years.

The Day After Roswell was ghostwritten by William J. Birnes — later editor of UFO Magazine and author of The Star Trek Cookbook — and credited to Corso. According to Birnes, he spent two years working on the book with Corso. Birnes also said they had initially wanted to do a memoir based on his military experiences, but when Corso referenced UFOs during their conversations, Birnes found what he said on that topic "compelling enough for its own book".

The book was publicized in interviews by Corso, including on Dateline NBC on June 24, 1997. The Dateline segment noted in its reporting that it was airing the same day the US Air Force released "The Roswell Report: Case Closed".

== Synopsis ==
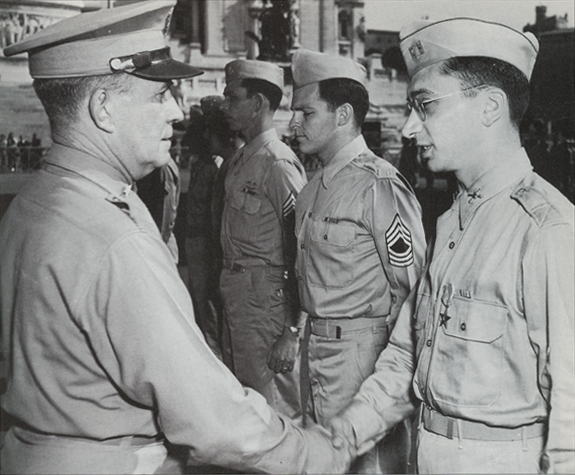
Philip J. Corso (right) in 1945

The Day After Roswell sets-out Corso's claims that the U.S. Government recovered an alien spaceship from the Roswell incident debris in 1947, and reverse engineered its technology for corporate and military use, matters which it kept secret and which Corso himself led. The book also puts forth Corso's claim to have seen the body of an extraterrestrial in a shipping crate at Fort Riley, Kansas in 1947, and recounts several other alleged exploits and adventures of Corso.

== Reception ==
The Day After Roswell appeared on The New York Times Best Seller List for three weeks, peaking at number twelve.

It received mixed reviews. The Baltimore Sun referred to the book as "disturbing" while The Financial Post's review was titled "Book Reads Like Unidentified Lying Object." Writing for the Dayton Daily News, James Cummings opined "the believers will believe him, the skeptics will dismiss him, and the publishers will come out with a new series of books discussing him".

Karl T. Pflock — who met Corso in 1993 and was left with the impression that he was a "blowhard loony tune" — claimed that many persons who followed the subject of UFOs thought The Day After Roswell "is from far out of left field".

In 2001, The Guardian named The Day After Roswell to its list of "Top 10 literary hoaxes".

== Controversies ==
When it was released, the book contained a foreword written by Strom Thurmond. Thurmond wrote, "He has many interesting stories to share with individuals interested in military history, espionage and the workings of our Government." The foreword did not mention anything about UFOs, since Thurmond had assumed the book was a straightforward memoir. When he learned about the book's contents, Thurmond stated, "I know of no such 'cover-up,' and do not believe one existed."

In 2011, the UK's National Archives declassified several decades worth of government files on the subject of UFOs, included in which was a 1997 internal memo dismissing the claims in The Day After Roswell due to Corso having a "previous track record of unreliable testimony".

=== Errors, omissions, and improbabilities ===
Analysts have identified numerous errors and omissions of basic, known facts described in The Day After Roswell, as well as feats attributed to Corso that are chronologically impossible.

Philip J. Klass challenged several claims made in the book as factually unbelievable, such as Corso's assertion that he was put in charge of alien wreckage from Roswell despite not even having "a bachelor's degree in science or engineering", Klass noting there were "many very competent scientists with Top Secret clearances then employed in Army research and development laboratories". Klass also identified several errors in the text, such as its misidentification of the 8th Air Force headquarters as being at Fort Bliss and not Fort Worth Army Air Field; its misdating of Walter Haut's Roswell crash press release; and its erroneous description of the MIM-23 Hawk as "heat-seeking" when it is, in fact, radar-guided.

Chapter 6, The Strategy

"... I led my faceless pursuer right to Langley, Virginia, past a sputtering secretary, and straight into the office of my old adversary, the director of covert operations Frank Wiesner, one of the best friends the KGB ever had."

— Philip J. Corso and William Birnes, The Day After Roswell

According to Kevin D. Randle, citing Eisenhower Presidential Library archivist Herbert L. Pankratz, despite the book's claim that Corso was a National Security Council staff member, there is no documentary evidence affirming he ever held such a role. Randle has also noted that a story told in the book about Corso entering CIA headquarters in Langley, Virginia in 1961 to confront "his old adversary" agency executive Frank Wisner — whose name was misspelled as Wiesner — would have been impossible as the Langley headquarters hadn't opened until after 1961 and Wisner was posted to London at the time, in any case.

Pflock, who also analyzed The Day After Roswell, notes that the book attributes the development of the CORONA program to Corso and Arthur Trudeau during a period when Corso says he was posted to The Pentagon, but that the first CORONA launch actually occurred two years before Corso's Pentagon posting, making such a contribution by Corso impossible.

Reviewing The Day After Roswell in the Skeptical Inquirer, Brad Sparks took issue with the book placing Corso as a central, heroic figure in an improbably large number of the 20th century's seminal moments including the Cuban Missile Crisis, the John F. Kennedy assassination, and the outing of KGB spies within the CIA, despite there being no historical record of Corso's involvement in any such events beyond the book itself.

=== Lawsuits ===
Following the book's release, producer Neil Russell sued Corso and his son, Philip Corso, Jr., in Los Angeles County Superior Court, alleging that the younger Corso threatened Russell's life on the elder Corso's orders as part of a scheme to obtain a more lucrative movie deal for the book; Russell had previously purchased film rights to Corso's memoir.

Based on supposed revelations of the book, Peter Gersten's Citizens Against UFO Secrecy sued the United States Government in 1998 seeking release of purported documents regarding the alleged retrieval of UFOs. The lawsuit was dismissed by Roslyn O. Silver of the U.S. District Court for the District of Arizona in April 1999.

== Editions ==
- Philip J. Corso; William J. Birnes (1997). The Day After Roswell. Pocket Books. ISBN 0-671-00461-1. (first edition)

== See also ==
- Potential cultural impact of extraterrestrial contact
- The Fortec Conspiracy, a 1968 novel about the US Air Force's Foreign Technology Division hiding alien material and bodies
