= 1984 Hudson Valley UFO sightings =

1984 alleged UFO sighting in New York and Connecticut

1984 Hudson Valley UFO Sightings
- A circular arc of lights photographed in the Hudson Valley.
- Date: March 1983-June 1984
- Location: Westchester County, Dutchess County, Putnam County and Fairfield County, United States

The 1984 Hudson Valley UFO Sightings, also called "The Westchester Boomerang", were UFO sightings that stretched throughout 1983–1984 in New York and Western Connecticut. State police reported that Cessna 152s had flown in tight formation with bright lights that could change colors, the pilots of which expressed amusement at the confusion caused by their hoax. Subsequent news stories, books, and other publicity helped make the sightings significant in local history and ufology lore.

== Event ==
Reports primarily occurred from March 1983 through the summer of 1984, in the Hudson Valley region of the Northeastern United States, including Westchester County, Dutchess County, and Putnam County in New York and Fairfield County in Connecticut. Residents reported seeing objects about the size of an American football field, "usually in a V-shape or a circle", according to The New York Times, "absolutely noiseless and outlined in brilliant lights of white, red or green". The objects were also described as being able to shoot straight up in the sky and hover in the air for extended periods of time.

=== Indian Point power plant sightings ===
Center for UFO Studies ufologist Philip Imbrogno stated he was approached by several guards from the Indian Point Nuclear Power Plant. According to Imbrogno, on June 14 and July 24, 1984, the guards saw a 900-foot (270 m) UFO hovering over the plant for 15 minutes. One security guard said it was 100 feet (30 m) long and 300 yards (270 m) above the plant and looked like helicopters in a V formation. The security guard said "that the guards broke out the shotguns". Imbrogno told The Journal News that "the commander gave the order to pull out the shotguns, and they summoned Camp Smith, but we have no documentation".

A power authority security coordinator, John Branciforte, said, "I think people are going to publish stories on hysteria (and) misinformation. As far as I'm concerned, it's pure speculation." Branciforte stated that officers did not arm themselves with shotguns, and that Imbrogno "could possibly be making it up or he took what they (witnesses) gave him and stretched it out". Spokesman for the New York Power Authority (NYPA) and Sergeant Spiro for Troop K of the New York State Police said "they believed the sightings were Cessna 152s flown by pranksters out of Stormville Airport." Patrick stated that "pilots of private and commercial planes use the plant as a 'handy landmark' when flying nearby. 'From the air it is easy to pick out... I don't know of any regulations that restrict the airspace around Indian Point'".

Spokesman for the Nuclear Regulatory Commission (NRC) Brian Norris stated that they had received a FOIA request from Imbrogno for the Indian Point incident, but had "no documentation of the sighting".

=== Other reports ===
External videos
- Pozzouli Video; Resident Bob Pozzuoli videotaped these lights in July 1984.

On July 24, Brewster resident Bob Pozzuoli videotaped a luminous phenomenon that, to Pozzuoli, appeared to be an object flying as its lights rotated counterclockwise. No sound was audible on the audio portion of the recording.

William A. Pollard, driving on Interstate 84, recounted to the New York Times that he saw an object hovering about 30 feet (9.1 m) above the ground in a field, "a gigantic triangle with lights". The alleged object shot straight up upon its lights going dark. Pollard said he had seen the lights many times, but the first time was very different from everything he saw later; it was "rigid".

At about 9:00 p.m. on Monday, August 20, 1984, Mahopac resident Irene Lunn reported that an object was heading south over a pond, "just clearing the trees....There was no sound at all, you could hear the crickets... about three-quarters the size of my house, with an L-shaped structure suspended underneath it.... At one point, all the lights went green, then red, then they went back to a pattern of green and red and white. I felt like it was letting us know it knew we were watching it. That was scary. It went on for about 10 minutes."

== Identification ==
A state police officer of Troop K stated that he had followed the lights to the small Stormville Airport in Dutchess County and reported back to Sgt. Kenneth V. Spiro, who explained to reporters:

"It was a group of light planes. They fly in formation. The undersides and under the wings are painted black, so they can't be seen from the ground. The planes are rigged with bright lights that they can turn from one color to another. It's the lights that give the shape to the U.F.O."

According to state police, there were five or six such planes. Spiro said: "The trooper spoke to a couple of the pilots, and they're getting a big kick out of it. There's no violation of the law here."

According to Timothy L. Hartnett, the deputy director of the Eastern region of the FAA, planes "can fly as close together as they feel safe..." going on to say that their altitude can be as low as 500 feet (150 m) "in areas of sparse population". In February 1984, a pilot interviewed by the Poughkeepsie Journal said he and other pilots "[tested] their skills flying in a V shape using a rotating beacon and navigation lights. The formation might appear motionless because it is so wide and can be seen from long distances."

Discover Magazine in 1984 reported that a group of pilots practicing their formation skills, first in the daytime, then when they became more confident, at night, "became tight formations of aircraft", further adding that at times their proximity respective to one another closed to within as little as 6 inches (15 cm) between wingtips. According to skeptical writer Brian Dunning, "there's no evidence that these pilots ever intended a UFO hoax" but "when local newspapers began printing stories about strange sightings and experiences, and television stations ran tapes of the mysterious lights in the sky, the pilots were incredulous, then amused. The group began calling themselves the Martians." The pilots would turn off their exterior lights at the same time, which would make the aircraft appear to disappear from the sky. "They vary their formations, from crescents and circles to crosses that looked from the ground like diamonds or V's, giving rise to reports about different and sometimes startling UFO shapes."

== Ufology ==
According to ufologist Peter Gersten, in the summer of 1984, his organization Citizens Against UFO Secrecy (CAUS) received hundreds of reports of a large boomerang-shaped object hovering over trees with lights and a "slight buzz". Gersten had at that time not interviewed the pilots who had claimed responsibility, and as of September 1984, his group was offering a $1,000 reward for information regarding the identities of the pilots flying the light aircraft out of Stormville Airport. Gersten intended to hire a private investigator to look into the timing of reported sightings possibly corresponding to the flights by the pilots, and put forward his hypothesis that while some of the eyewitness accounts were explainable by pilots flying in a V formation, some of the reports were, in his view, not congruent with this explanation.

Gersten stated "It could be explained as extraterrestrial. We had someone try to photograph (the object). But it has avoided being filmed." According to the manager of CPI Photo Finish in Yorktown, "We're seeing quite a few U.F.O. pictures. People come in and hand you the film and say: 'Be careful with these. We ran outside with our camera because something was flying over our house."

J. Allen Hynek, the former scientific advisor to the Air Force's Project Blue Book, who later in life favored the interdimensional hypothesis explanation of UFOs, described the incident as "absolutely weird. There's no logical explanation for it." Some witnesses reportedly refused to believe that planes flying in formation were responsible for their sightings, and on August 28, 1984, ufologists convened a conference in Brewster, New York, to discuss the recent rash of UFO sightings.

In 1987, Ballantine Books published Night Siege: The Hudson Valley UFO sightings, by the late J. Allen Hynek, Phillip J. Imbrogno, and Bob Pratt. Imbrogno reported having himself witnessed the Hudson Valley UFO for a period of five minutes. Imbrogno noted similarities between the Hudson Valley object and the recently declassified stealth bomber. In their book and interviews, ufologists Hynek, Imbrogno, and Pratt publicized photographic stills of videotape evidence they believed depicted the UFO.

In 1992, the sightings were the subject of an episode of Unsolved Mysteries.

In 2017, Brian Dunning interviewed Revolt film director Joe Miale about how his childhood memory of "triangular craft with colored lights moving slowly over our houses" in the Hudson Valley cemented his lifelong fascination with science fiction. Dunning speculated why despite these explanations, the "Hudson Valley UFO phenomenon" was popularized and books like Night Siege were written. According to Dunning, "These were not journalists or objective reporters. They were all UFO authors who made their careers out of sensationalizing these little stories they found by keeping an eye on the newspapers. None had any serious academic credibility." Dunning further asserts: "This alleged UFO only existed at a time and place where the [pilots] were doing their nighttime formation flying. The UFO looked the same, behaved the same, it flew in the same way and in the same place. Would that not be a staggering coincidence? Isn't it more likely that our human perceptual errors and confirmation bias and selective memory and all the other cognitive phenomena that shape our perceptions played some role here? Personally, I think it is."

== See also ==
- List of reported UFO sightings
- List of hoaxes
