= Nancy Hayfield =

American novelist

Nancy Hayfield is an author, editor, and publisher. In 1979, she graduated summa cum laude from Princeton University. Nancy Hayfield's first novel Cleaning House was published by Farrar, Straus and Giroux in 1980. In 1985, writing under her married name of Nancy Birnes, Hayfield published Cheaper and Better at Harper & Row (now HarperCollins) and was the host of a PBS show called Living Cheaper and Better. In 1990, she published Zap Crafts at Ten Speed Press, described in the Chicago Tribune as a "book of recreational fun"--"one of those oddities that is fun to thumb through." She was the editor of the McGraw-Hill Personal Computer Programming Encyclopedia in 1986 and 1989, the UFO Magazine UFO Encyclopedia in 2002. She was also the last editor-in-chief of UFO Magazine when that publication ceased publication. She is currently the editor-in-chief of Filament Books.

She is married to William J. Birnes. Together they ran a computer science business in the 1980s.

== Cleaning House ==
Her first novel Cleaning House (1980) was widely reviewed. One of the two reviews in the New York Times called it "wildly funny."
