= List of paranormal magazines =

This is a list of notable magazines on paranormal, anomalous and Fortean phenomena. These magazines are generally opposed by skeptical magazines.

- 3rd Stone – an Earth mysteries magazine; defunct
- Explore: The Journal of Science & Healing
- Fate – broad array of accounts of the strange and unknown
- Fortean Times – publishes reports of anomalous phenomena and investigative articles
- Journal of Near-Death Studies
- Journal of Parapsychology
- Journal of Scientific Exploration – official research journal of the Society for Scientific Exploration
- Lobster – twice yearly magazine focused on parapolitics
- Magazine of the Society for Psychical Research – quarterly membership magazine covering a broad range of paranormal phenomena; previously known as the Paranormal Review
- NeuroQuantology
- Nexus – UFOs, fringe science, conspiracy theory, alternative medicine
- Steamshovel Press – investigative articles, parapolitics, alternative history; self-described as "all conspiracy, no theory"; defunct
- UFO Magazine – American magazine, not to be confused with the now-defunct British UFO Magazine; defunct
- Weird NJ – deals with sightings of UFOs, ghosts, the Jersey Devil and other supernatural occurrences in the state of New Jersey
