= Robert D. Keppel =

American criminologist (1944–2021)

Robert David Keppel
- Born: June 15, 1944
- Died: June 14, 2021 (age 76)
- Education: Washington State University
- Occupations: Criminologist; detective; professor; author

Robert David Keppel (June 15, 1944 – June 14, 2021) was an American law enforcement officer and detective. He was also an associate professor at the University of New Haven and Sam Houston State University. Keppel was known for his contributions to the investigations of Ted Bundy and Gary Ridgway, and also assisted in the creation of HITS, the Homicide Investigation Tracking System.

== Early life ==
Robert Keppel was raised in Spokane, Washington, where he attended Central Valley High School. After graduating, he went on to attend Washington State University, where he competed in the high jump. Keppel was inspired by his father to pursue criminal justice, in hopes to become a police chief. He went on to receive his master's degree in police science and administration. Following graduation in 1966, Keppel worked for the King County Sheriff's Office before being drafted as an Army drill sergeant and a captain in the Vietnam War from 1967 to 1974.

== Career ==
The "Ted Murders" marked the beginning of Robert Keppel's career as a detective. Witnesses from Lake Sammamish State Park provided information regarding a man named "Ted" who had talked to two young women that were declared missing. During the investigation, Keppel narrowed down a large list of suspects until he was left with 25, including Ted Bundy. He confronted Bundy, but Bundy dismissed the conversation. Before Keppel could speak with him again, Bundy had already been arrested and fled custody.

After moving on from the "Ted Murders," Keppel decided to return to a doctorate program at University of Washington. While completing this 12-year program, he took the position as chief investigator for Washington State Attorney General's office. In this position, he investigated other crimes like the disappearance of Captain Rolf Neslund, and the death of Donna Howard.

Keppel was asked to assist in the Green River Task Force for the investigation of a set of murders in Washington. By 1984, Ted Bundy began writing letters to Robert Keppel in hopes to help in the investigation of the Green River Killer. This correspondence led to interviews between the two, which resulted in Bundy confessing to his unidentified crimes days before his execution.

== Later life ==
Keppel retired as chief criminal investigator for the Washington State Attorney General's Office in 1995. He joined the faculty of Seattle University. As of 2004, Keppel was an associate professor of criminal justice at Sam Houston State University, and taught there via teleconference. In 2007, Keppel joined the University of New Haven as an associate professor of criminal justice.

Keppel was author of The Riverman: Ted Bundy and I Hunt for the Green River Killer, made into a made-for-TV movie of the same name in 2004, starring Bruce Greenwood as Keppel and Cary Elwes as Bundy. He was also the author of many textbooks regarding criminal justice and related topics.

== Works ==
- Serial Murder: Future Implications for Police Investigations (1989; ISBN 0932930840)
- Signature Killers (with William Birnes) (1997; ISBN 0671001302)
- Murder: A Multidisciplinary Anthology of Readings (with Joseph Weis) (1999)
- The Psychology of Serial Killer Investigations: The Grisly Business Unit (with William Birnes) (2003; ISBN 0124042600)
- The Riverman: Ted Bundy and I Hunt for the Green River Killer (with William Birnes) (1995; ISBN 0671867636 / Revised after Ridgeway confessions, 2004; ISBN 9780671867638)
- Offender Profiling (2006; ISBN 075938875X)
- Forensic Pattern Recognition: From Fingerprints to Tool Marks (with Katherine M. Brown and Kristen M. Welch) (2006; ISBN 978-0132329484)
- Serial Violence: Analysis of Modus Operandi and Signature Characteristics of Killers (with William Birnes) (2008; ISBN 9781420066326)
- Profiling: Principles, Processes, Practicalities (with David V. Canter) (2010; ISBN 9780131192768)
