= Clapham, West Sussex =

Village and parish in West Sussex, England

Coordinates: 50.84651°N 0.44746°W

Clapham
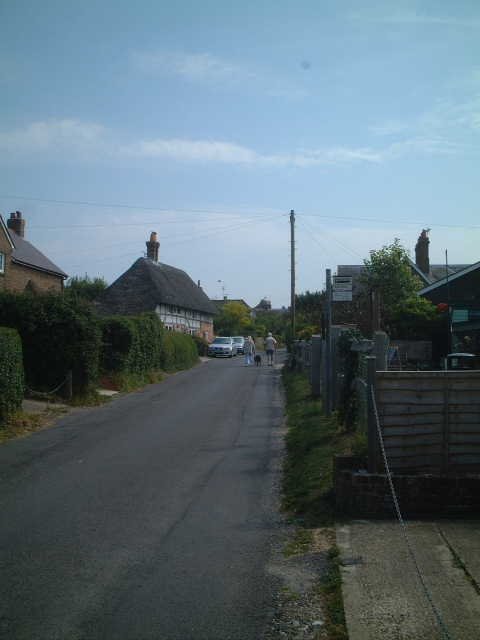
- The Street in Clapham August 2004

- Location within West Sussex
- Area: 5.15 km^{2} (1.99 sq mi)
- Population: 275 (Civil Parish.2011)
  - Density: 53/km^{2} (140/sq mi)
- OS grid reference: TQ094063
  - London: 47 miles (76 km) NNE
- Civil parish: Clapham
- District: Arun
- Shire county: West Sussex
- Region: South East
- Country: England
- Sovereign state: United Kingdom
- Post town: WORTHING
- Postcode district: BN13
- Dialling code: 01903
- Police: Sussex
- Fire: West Sussex
- Ambulance: South East Coast
- UK Parliament: Worthing West
- Website: http://www.arun.gov.uk/clapham

Clapham is a rural village and civil parish in the Arun District of West Sussex, England. It lies on varying downslopes and escarpment of the South Downs National Park three miles (5 km) north of Angmering on the A280 road and north of the A27 crossroads. It is adjacent to the village of Patching.

== Geography ==
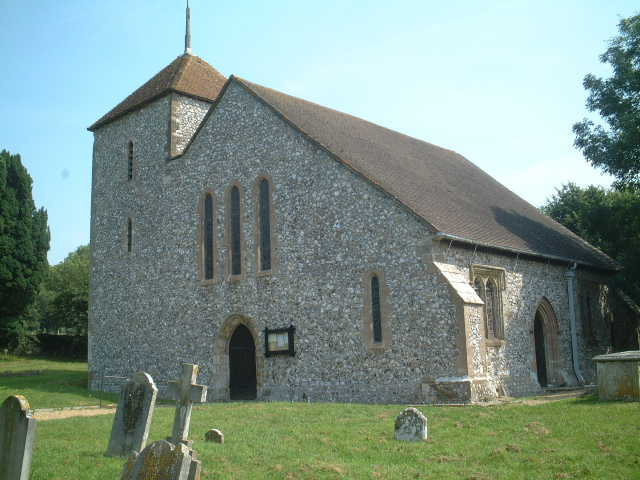
Church of St Mary the Virgin, Clapham, believed to have been built in the 12th century.

The main part of the village is known simply as The Street, a single long dead-end road coming off the A280 and containing the majority of the village's housing. The Street is also home to the local school and, up a slight incline into the woods, the Church of St Mary the Virgin, a 12th-century building. The houses of The Street are a combination of 1930s council houses, much older original village cottages and post-Second World War bungalows in some of the new closes.

A turn-off from the A280 a few hundred metres to the south of The Street leads into Brickworks Lane (although this name is not commonly used), named after the brickworks of the Clapham Common Brick & Tile Company which was based there from the early 20th century up until the 1970s, although the quantities of clay available meant that there had been brickmaking activity on the site since the 18th century. The site of the old brickworks is now occupied by a branch of the Travis Perkins builder's merchant's company, and at the end of Brickworks Lane there is a West Sussex County Council highways depot.

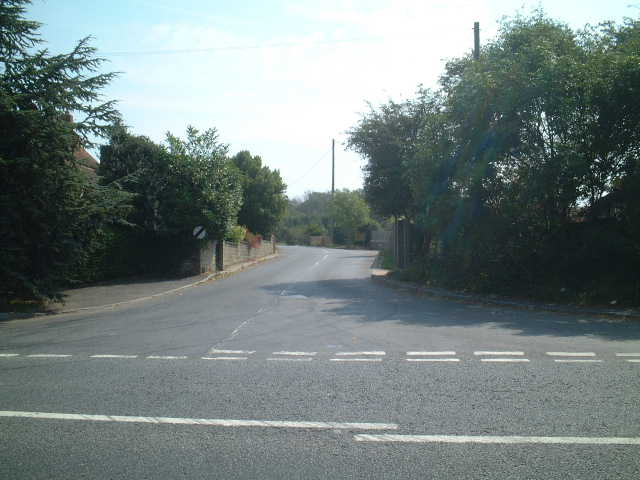
Brickworks Lane, with Clapham Common turning off to the right a little way in.

Clapham Common itself turns off Brickworks Lane and is mostly made up of 1930s council houses. Both roads are also dead ends.

The houses of the village are surrounded mostly by fields and woodland, but the increasing encroachment of housing and road-building into the area is decreasing this green belt. Arun District Council's local plan envisages that in the long term at least in the early 21st century Clapham and Patching will be slowly absorbed as conjoining suburbs of Durrington as more houses and retirement apartments become demanded.

== History ==
Clapham is mentioned in the Domesday Book of 1086, where it is spelled Clopeham. The woods around the area made it an ideal location for the gathering of wood for timber and firewood, and led to the first Saxon settlements in the area.

For many years much of the land around Clapham was owned by the Dukes of Norfolk and subsequently, after a land exchange, by the Somerset family, although by the early 20th century most of the land owned by the family had been sold off or donated to the village.

== Landmarks ==
Within the parish lies Clapham Wood, which is said to be haunted. The area was under the media spotlight in the 1970s due to many strange events which took place in local woodlands which became known as the Clapham Wood Mystery.

== Local Commerce ==
There is one major farm in Clapham, which for many decades was operated by the tenant farmers, the Cornford family; it is now run as part of the Somerset estate. There is a village tea room and stores based in a portable cabin concreted into a corner of the recreation ground on The Street. There are also a retirement home, a kennels and a business centre. Many of the residents of working age have jobs in nearby Worthing.

== Amenities ==
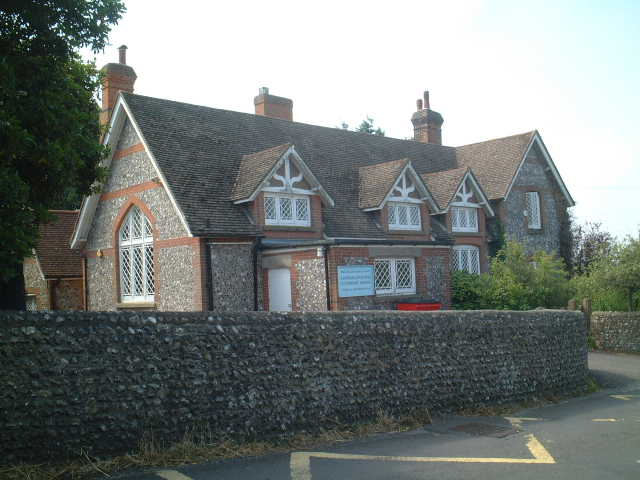
Clapham & Patching CE Primary School.

The village primary school was established in the early 19th century, and has occupied its current building since the 1830s, with various improvements over recent years - the school finally gained indoor toilets in 1990.

In 1976, with fewer than thirty children being educated at the school, the West Sussex Local Education Authority recommended its closure. The school was at the time the smallest in the county, but a protest by staff, pupils and parents resulted in the County Council narrowly voting against closure. The school currently educates around fifty pupils. Children of secondary school age are educated at The Angmering School in nearby Angmering.

The Village Hall, opened in 1977, is also shared with the neighbouring Patching. Previously, a smaller village hall was located on The Street in Clapham, but this was destroyed by fire. The Hall is home to many local clubs and societies, and is regularly used as a venue for Church and School fetes. For many years the green there was the home ground of Clapham & Patching Cricket Club, but the club was forced to merge with the local Littlehampton club in 2000 and now plays home matches there. The village's current premier sports team is the Short Mat Bowls club, who compete in many local competitions.

The nearest local pubs, The World's End (formerly the Horse and Groom) and, although slightly further away for most residents, The Fox, are both located in Patching. For many years the two villages shared a local policeman who was based at a police-owned house in Patching, but this was discontinued in the late 1970s, and police from Worthing now cover the area.
