= Cash–Landrum incident =

Alleged unidentified flying object sighting

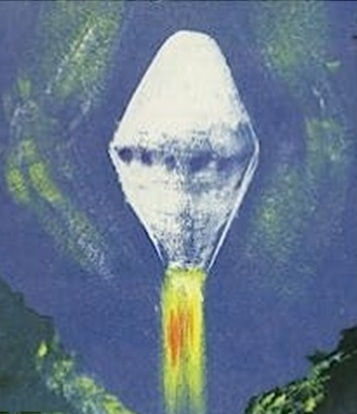
Depiction of the Cash–Landrum UFO by Kathy Schuessler on the cover of her husband John's 1998 book.

The Cash–Landrum incident was an unidentified flying object sighting in the United States in 1980, which witnesses claimed was responsible for causing health and property damage. Uncharacteristically for such UFO reports, this resulted in civil court proceedings, though the case ended in a dismissal.

A number of skeptical investigators, including Philip J. Klass, Peter Brookesmith, Steuart Campbell, Curt Collins, and Brian Dunning, questioned the details and overall authenticity of the incident.

== Incident report ==
=== Description of encounter ===
On the evening of December 29, 1980, Betty Cash (aged 51), Vickie Landrum (57), and Vickie's grandson Colby Landrum (7) were going home to Dayton, Texas, in Cash's Oldsmobile Cutlass after dining out. They said that at about 9 p.m., while driving on an isolated two-lane road in dense woods, they saw a light above some trees that they first thought was an airplane approaching Houston Intercontinental Airport (about 35 miles [56 km] away), giving it little notice.

A few minutes later on the winding roads, they saw what they believed to be the same light as before, but thought it was now much closer and brighter. They said that the light came from a huge diamond-shaped object, which hovered at about treetop level, and that its base was expelling flame and emitting significant heat.

Landrum told Cash to stop the car, fearing they would be burned if they got closer. However, Landrum, a born-again Christian, soon reinterpreted the object as a sign of the Second Coming of Jesus Christ, telling Colby, "That's Jesus. He will not hurt us."

Cash said she was anxious, and considered turning the car around, but abandoned this idea, because the road was too narrow and she presumed the car would get stuck on the dirt shoulders, which were soft from that evening's rains.

Cash and Landrum said that they got out of the car to examine the object, but that Colby was terrified, so Landrum quickly returned to the vehicle to comfort him. Cash remained outside, "mesmerized by the bizarre sight", as Jerome Clark wrote. He went on:

The object, intensely bright and a dull metallic silver, was shaped like a huge upright diamond, about the size of the Dayton water tower, with its top and bottom cut off so that they were flat rather than pointed. Small blue lights ringed the center, and periodically over the next few minutes flames shot out of the bottom, flaring outward to create the effect of a large cone. Every time the fire dissipated, the UFO floated a few feet downward toward the road. But when the flames blasted out again, the object rose about the same distance.

They said the heat was strong enough to make the car's metal body painful to the touch. Cash said she had to use her coat to protect her hand from being burned by the door handle when she finally got back in the car. When she touched the dashboard, Landrum claimed her hand pressed into the softened vinyl, leaving an imprint that was evident weeks later. Investigators cited it as proof of their account; video evidence of this was shown in UFOs: What's Going On, a 1985 HBO documentary.

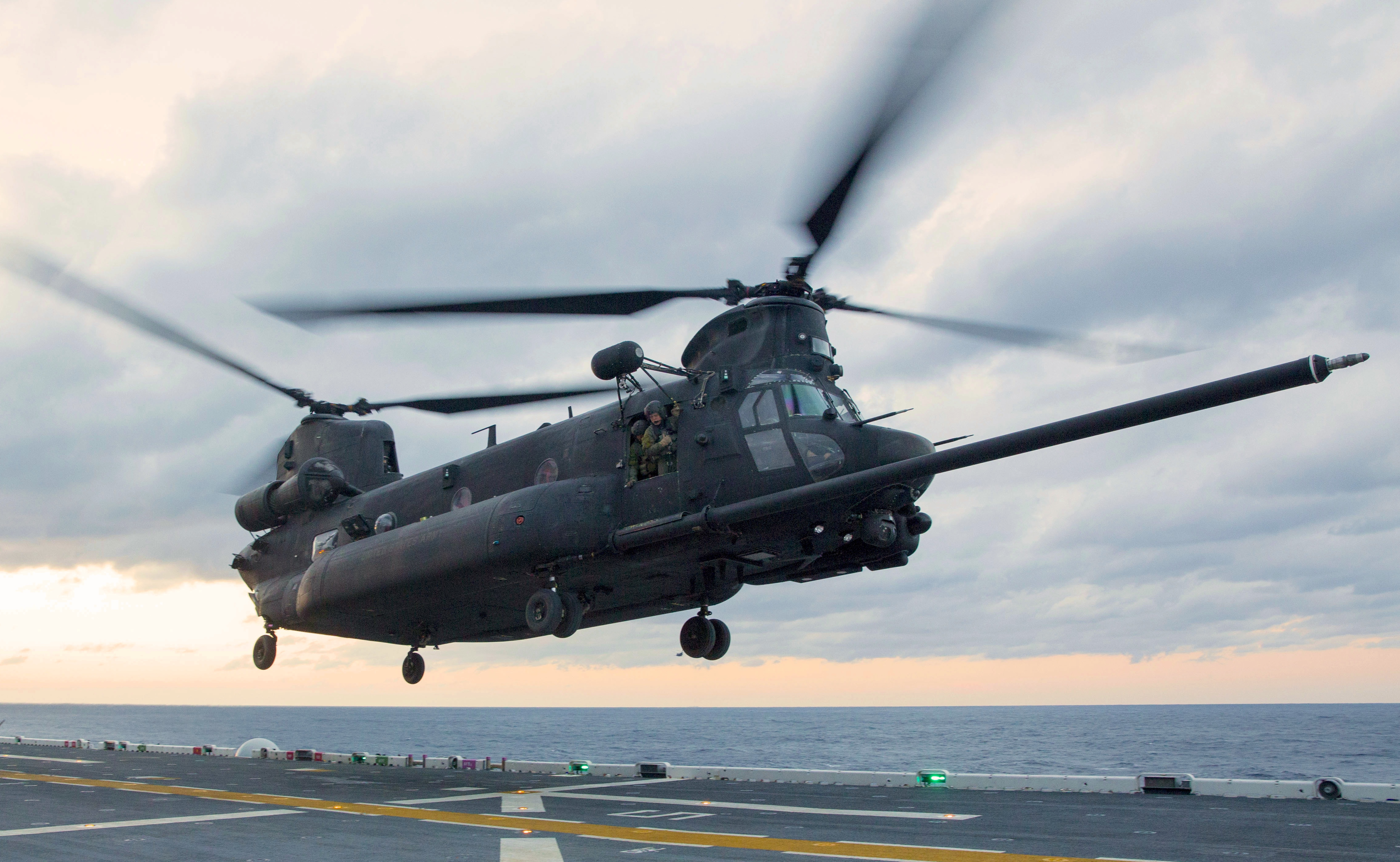
A black Boeing CH-47 Chinook, similar to the helicopters allegedly seen

They said that the object ascended over the treetops and rose higher into the sky. A group of helicopters then approached it, surrounding it in tight formation. Cash and Landrum counted 23 helicopters, and later identified some of them as tandem-rotor Boeing CH-47 Chinooks used by military forces worldwide. More specifically, Cash claimed that they had "United States Air Force" markings.

With the road now clear, Cash says she drove on, claiming to see glimpses of the object and the helicopters receding into the distance.

From the object's first sighting to its departure, they said the encounter lasted about 20 minutes. Based on descriptions given in John F. Schuessler's book about the incident, it appears that they were southbound on Texas state highway FM 1485/2100 when they claimed to have seen the object. The initial location of the reported object, based on the same descriptions, was just south of Inland Road, approximately 30.0926°N 95.1109°W. But as published in the Skeptical Inquirer, Robert Sheaffer concluded that despite media reports to the contrary, "neither Cash, nor Landrum, nor Schuessler had any idea [of precisely] where this incident actually took place!"

=== Health problem claims ===
The witnesses claimed that after the UFO and helicopters left, Cash took the Landrums home, then retired for the evening. That night, they reportedly all experienced similar symptoms, though Cash to a greater degree. The claim was that they suffered from nausea, vomiting, diarrhea, generalized weakness, a burning sensation in their eyes, and feeling as though they were suffering from sunburn.

Over the next few days, Cash said her symptoms worsened, with many large, painful blisters forming on her skin. Jerome Clark writes that, when Cash was taken to a hospital emergency room on January 3, 1981, she "could not walk, and had lost large patches of skin and clumps of hair. She was released after 12 days, though her condition was not much better, and she later returned to the hospital for another 15 days." In a 1985 HBO documentary, UFOs: What's Going On, Cash's hair loss was shown in pictures and she claimed doctors switched from treating her for burns to treating her for radiation sickness after realizing she had been exposed to radiation. Later, she was treated for cancer.

The Landrums' health was somewhat better, though reportedly both suffered from lingering weakness, skin sores, and hair loss.

In April 1981, Vickie was found to be developing a cataract in one eye, and Betty was first treated for breast cancer in 1983.

However, Brad Sparks contends that, although the symptoms were somewhat similar to those caused by ionizing radiation, the rapidity of onset was only consistent with a massive dose that would have meant certain death in a few days. Since all of the victims lived for years after the incident, Sparks suggests the cause of the symptoms was some kind of chemical contamination, presumably by an aerosol. However, using modern dose estimations through time to onset of vomiting, an onset of vomiting one hour after exposure would yield a dose range of 5.2 - 6.6Gy, which although severe, is well below the LD/100. After two hours, this estimate reduces to 3.1 - 4.2Gy, below the LD/50, and consistent with the symptoms described.

In Gary P. Posner's contributed Cash–Landrum chapter for the 60-authored compendium titled The Reliability of UFO Witness Testimony, he agrees with Sparks about ionizing radiation, but concludes that there are "myriad reasons for skepticism of virtually every aspect" of this case. For example, regarding the above chronology in Clark (1998), Posner notes that Betty's actual medical records, as detailed in Schuessler (1998), documented that she was initially hospitalized from January 2–19. Her attending physician noted "little, if any, hair loss" upon admission (though it did develop weeks later), and her dermatology consultant diagnosed only cellulitis and swelling of the scalp and face with no mention of any skin loss.

=== Other claims ===
During their Bergstrom Air Force Base interview eight months post-incident, which would pertain to legal action they would pursue against the federal government, Betty drew and signed what she described as "a diamond" when asked to sketch a picture of what they saw. Vickie concurred, adding flames shooting down from the pointed bottom and also signing the sketch. However, in their "first documented reports of the incident" 34 days following the alleged close encounter, which was recorded and then transcribed by John Schuessler's wife, Kathy, Betty Cash stated that she "could not get up close enough [and] the lights were too bright" for her to discern the shape, and Vickie said that she also "couldn't tell", adding that only her seven-year-old grandson Colby "swore it looked like a big diamond."

In April 1981, a CH-47 helicopter flew into Dayton. Colby witnessed the flight and became very upset. Landrum decided to take him to the area where the helicopter had landed with the hope that it would seem less frightening on the ground. When they reached the landing zone, they found a number of people already there and had to wait some time before they were allowed to enter the helicopter and talk to the pilot. Landrum and another visitor both claimed that the pilot admitted he had been in the area before for the purpose of checking on a UFO that was in a state of trouble near Huffman. Landrum told the pilot she was glad to see him, elaborating that she had been one of the people burned by the UFO. The pilot reportedly refused to talk with them further and urged them out of the aircraft. However, this confrontation was reportedly born of confusion, as the incident the pilot was referring to had apparently taken place in July 1977, more than three years prior to Landrum's encounter.

In May 1982, UFO investigators interviewed a Dayton police officer, Patrolman Lamar Walker, and his wife Marie, who claimed to have seen approximately twelve Chinook-type helicopters the same night and near the same area in which the Cash–Landrum event had allegedly occurred. They did not report seeing a UFO or unexplained lights, but said that one or more of the helicopters "had some type of a [bright] light shining down."

== Aftermath ==
=== Legal action ===
Eventually, Cash and Landrum contacted their U.S. senators, Lloyd Bentsen and John Tower, who suggested that the witnesses file a complaint with the Judge Advocate claims office at Bergstrom Air Force Base. In August 1981, Cash, Landrum, and Colby were interviewed at length by personnel at Bergstrom Air Force Base, and were told that they should hire a lawyer, and seek financial compensation for their injuries.

With attorney Peter Gersten taking on the case pro bono, the case wound its way through the U.S. courts for several years. Cash and Landrum sued the U.S. federal government for $20 million. Testimony of officials from NASA, the Air Force, and the Army and Navy was given.

Persuaded by their testimony (and other evidence) that no agency of the U.S. government possessed any such UFO, and that no military personnel had operated any of the reported helicopters, U.S. district court judge Ross N. Sterling dismissed their case on August 21, 1986.

=== Media coverage ===
The incident received coverage in both the tabloid press and mainstream media:

- In 1981, Landrum appeared on That's Incredible!, a popular ABC television program. She was hypnotized in front of a studio audience; under hypnosis, she recounted the UFO incident (see "External links" below).
- Landrum and Cash both appeared on the 1989 U.S. television special UFO Cover Up? Live!, hosted by Mike Farrell, where they related their account of the purported UFO encounter and their subsequent medical problems and legal battles.
- The Cash–Landrum event was also depicted on the television programs Unsolved Mysteries and Sightings.
- In 2009, Colby appeared on UFO Hunters: Alien Fallout.

=== Deaths of Cash and Landrum ===
Betty Joyce Cash (née Collins) died aged 69 on December 29, 1998, eighteen years to the day after her claimed close encounter.

Vickie Marzelia Landrum (née Holifield) died aged 83 on September 12, 2007.

== Investigations ==
Landrum telephoned a number of U.S. government agencies and officials about the encounter. When she telephoned NASA, she was steered toward NASA aerospace engineer John Schuessler, long interested in UFOs. With some associates from civilian UFO research group Mutual UFO Network (MUFON), Schuessler began research on the case, and later wrote articles and a book on the subject. Astronomer Allan Hendry of the Center for UFO Studies (CUFOS) also briefly investigated the Cash–Landrum case.

Due to the Chinook helicopters' presence, the witnesses presumed that at least one branch of the United States Armed Forces had witnessed the object, maybe even escorting or pursuing it. However, investigators could find no evidence linking the helicopters with any branch of the military.

In 1982, Lt. Col. George Sarran, of the Office of the Inspector General of the United States Army, began the only thorough formal governmental investigation into the supposed UFO encounter. He could not find any evidence that the helicopters the witnesses claimed to have seen belonged to the U.S. Armed Forces. Sarran stated that "Ms. Landrum and Ms. Cash were credible ... the policeman and his wife [who claimed to have seen 12 helicopters near the UFO encounter site] were also credible witnesses. There was no perception that anyone was trying to exaggerate the truth."

In 1994, UFO skeptic Steuart Campbell suggested that the witnesses may have observed a mirage of the star Canopus, which lay exactly in line with the road.

In 1998, journalist and UFO skeptic Philip J. Klass, found a few reasons to doubt the story by Cash and Landrum:

When Schuessler inspected Betty's car in early 1981 and used a Geiger counter to check for radioactivity, he found none. Presumably he also checked for radioactivity when he visited the site of the (alleged) incident, and found no abnormal radiation ... [Schuessler] provides NO medical data on Betty's health PRIOR to the UFO incident. Nor does he provide any medical data on the prior health of Vicki[e] or Colby. [emphasis in original]

UFO researcher Curt Collins details the unsuccessful efforts of the Texas Department of Health's Bureau of Radiation Control to detect any residual radiation in the vicinity of the reported incident. He quotes from a 1981 Houston Chronicle article in which Russ Meyer, manager of the state's public health department in Houston, says, "If there had been radioactive contamination in large amounts, some would still be left there." The Chronicle article goes on: "However, he said certain types of radiation – such as ultraviolet light, infrared light and low-energy X-rays – might not leave any residual traces." Other UFO researchers point out that high-energy ionizing radiation of the kind that can cause damage to human beings, such as gamma radiation, does not induce radioactivity in objects and would not have left behind any residual radioactivity in the area.

Skeptical British ufologist Peter Brookesmith writes: "Sceptics have always asked a blunt and fundamental question: What was the trio's state of health before their alleged encounter?" Brookesmith also wrote: "To ufologists, the case is perhaps the most baffling and frustrating of modern times, for what started with solid evidence for a notoriously elusive phenomenon petered out in a maze of dead ends, denials, and perhaps even official deviousness."

In December 2018, Brian Dunning investigated the case and reported his findings on the Skeptoid podcast. He found that Cash's doctor's notes attribute her hair loss to the autoimmune disease alopecia areata, that her other symptoms could be caused by an illness that started before the incident, and that Landrum's only documented illness is developing a cataract in one eye. Dunning concludes:

In my experience, it's completely plausible that Cash and Landrum wrongly, but honestly, placed the blame for their health problems onto whatever they saw; and even pushed the truth a bit trying to get the Air Force to pay for it. When you believe in your heart that the Air Force did something wrong that harmed you, you don't necessarily feel that it's wrong to exaggerate evidence – like seeing the words Air Force on the side of the helicopters, adding on symptoms to people who didn't have them, even faking sunburn spots on your arm – as long as it's in pursuit of what you believe to be a just settlement.

According to Texas Monthly, "To this day, there is no conclusive explanation of the night’s events." (Note: The Texas Monthly article by Pamela Colloff, cited above and below, contains an erroneous "1969" byline date (the C–L incident occurred 11 years thereafter). Colloff is uncertain but thinks she probably wrote it in 1996 or '97 (per this e-mail).)

== See also ==
- UFO sightings in the United States
- List of reported UFO sightings
