= Nexus (Australian magazine) =

Bi-monthly alternative news magazine

- Editor: Duncan Roads
- Categories: geopolitics and conspiracy theories
- Frequency: bi-monthly
- Founder: Ramses H. Ayana and Jenni Elf
- Founded: 1986
- Country: Australia
- Based in: Maleny, Queensland, Australia

Nexus is an Australian-based bi-monthly alternative news magazine. It covers geopolitics and conspiracy theories; health issues, including alternative medicine; future science; the unexplained, including UFOs; Big Brother; and historical revisionism. The magazine also publishes articles about freedom of speech and thought, and related issues. The magazine is or has been published in over 12 languages and is sold in over 20 countries. When including digital editions, Nexus has approximately 100,000 Australian readers and 1.1 million readers globally. It is owned and edited by Duncan Roads.

== Statement of purpose ==
In the magazine's masthead, a statement of purpose is printed:

NEXUS recognises that humanity is undergoing a massive transformation. With this in mind, NEXUS seeks to provide 'hard-to-get' information so as to assist people through these changes. NEXUS is not linked to any religious, philosophical or political ideology or organisation.

== History ==
The magazine was first formed in 1986 by Ramses H. Ayana as a quarterly publication covering human rights, the environment, alternative health, women's rights, New Age, Free Energy, alternative science and the paranormal. Co-founder of the magazine was Jenni Elf and both founders had previously worked on the independent Australian magazine Maggie's Farm. Nexus was purchased by Duncan Roads in 1990, continuing a long tradition of keeping alternative publications alive in Australia. Following the handover, the topics covered by Nexus were changed and it moved to a bi-monthly publication schedule.

== Conspiracy theories ==
In 1998, academic Michael Barkun wrote that "Recent issues of Nexus provide a collage of stigmatized knowledge claims, ranging from the health risks of fluoridated water, unleaded gasoline, and pasteurized milk, to "forbidden archaeology", Great Pyramid channeling, and UFO encounters. Threaded through this mélange of New Age and occult themes, however, are persistent political motifs". Barkun notes that Nexus's claimed goal "is the day when all people of all races and colours can live together in total trust and respect, on a planet that is clean, abundant, and healthy", but that this goal "seems constantly shadowed by malevolent forces" including the World Trade Organization, which is presented as a possible part of a sinister New World Order. Barkun observes that Nexus repeated conspiracy claims of right-wing American publications about the Oklahoma City bombing and that the magazine featured prominently in an article in the New Statesman titled "New-Age Nazism", which characterised it as "a propaganda journal for the ideas and conspiracy theories of the US militias". The New Statesman article's authors suggested that Nexus was originally a green, alternative magazine with an orientation that was liberal and multicultural but that it had become a publication of the far-right under editor Duncan Roads.

== Publication ==
The magazine's headquarters are in Maleny, Queensland, Australia. It is published in Australia, New Zealand, the US, the UK, France, Italy, Germany, Poland, Greece, Serbia, Croatia, Romania, and Russia. Nexus has also been translated in Swedish, Korean and Japanese.

In the US and in Italy, the magazine is published as Nexus New Times. In Greece, the magazine was first published as Nexus and, following a period of inactivity, as New Times Nexus. The Polish edition is published as Nexus. Nowe Czasy (English: Nexus. New Times). A Swedish edition was published between 1998 and 2000 with the title NEXUS Nya Tider.

== See also ==
- List of magazines of anomalous phenomena
- Philip Coppens, a contributor to Nexus magazine who died in 2012
