= UFO Magazine (UK) =

British magazine

- Categories: unidentified flying objects (UFOs) and extraterrestrial life
- Founder: Graham Birdsall and Mark Birdsall
- Founded: 1981
- Based in: Leeds, Yorkshire
- Website: www.fsr.org.uk/GBirdsall.htm

UFO Magazine was a British magazine devoted to the subject of unidentified flying objects (UFOs) and extraterrestrial life. It was founded in 1981 by brothers Graham Birdsall and Mark Birdsall of Leeds, Yorkshire. The magazine was one of the success stories of ufology, with an international reputation for quality and a peak circulation of 35,000.

Graham Birdsall died from a brain haemorrhage on 19 September 2003. He left behind his wife Christine, daughters Helen and Louise, granddaughter Katy, brother Mark and son-in-law Russel. The editor's job was taken over for a few months by Graham's son-in-law Russel Callaghan, but UFO Magazine eventually ceased publication in March 2004.

The void left by UFO Magazine has been filled to some extent by the newly produced UFO Data magazine referred to as the 'UFO Data Report' and Gary Heseltine's UFO Monthly Magazine.

== See also ==
- List of magazines of anomalous phenomena
- UFO Magazine (US version)
