= Cottonwood Grove Park =

Park in Washington, United States

Coordinates: 47°23′17″N 122°16′16″W

Cottonwood Grove Park is a .77-acre (0.31-hectare) park in the city of Kent, Washington. It is located on the banks of the Green River off Frager Road, at approximately the 23800 block South.

In March 1986, remains from a victim of serial killer Gary Ridgway (the Green River Killer) were found in the park.
