= William J. Birnes =

American author and ufologist (born 1944)

- Born: November 7, 1944 (age 81); United Stateshttps://en.wikhttps://en.wikipedia.org/wiki/Wikipedia:BLPSELFPUBipedia.org/wiki/Wikipedia:Biographies_of_living_persons
- Education: New York University (PhD); Concord Law School (JD)
- Occupations: Author, editor, publisher, lawyer
- Known for: UFO Hunters; UFO Magazine
- Notable work: The Day After Roswell
- Spouse: Nancy Hayfield

William J. "Bill" Birnes (born November 7, 1944) is an American author, ghostwriter,expert on serial killers, chairman of the board at Sunrise Community Counseling Center, and ufologist. He was the publisher of and wrote for UFO Magazine, and was the lead investigator on the TV show UFO Hunters. He has authored or coauthored books on a variety of topics, including the paranormal, UFOs, criminology, computer science, and novels. He ghostwrote The Day After Roswell with Philip J. Corso, which appeared on The New York Times Best Seller List.

== Early life and education ==
William J. Birnes was born November 7, 1944. In 1974, Birnes earned a Ph.D. in medieval literature from New York University with a dissertation on Piers Plowman. Birnes earned a J.D. degree from Concord Law School, a private online law school.

He is married to novelist Nancy Hayfield. Together they ran a computer science business in the 1980s.

== Career ==
Birnes served as a Lily Postdoctoral Research Fellow at the University of Pennsylvania and taught literature and linguistics at Trenton State College. He is also a lawyer. Birnes has repeatedly appeared as a guest on the late night radio talk-show Coast to Coast AM to discuss UFOs, and has coauthored a book with its host George Noory.

Birnes, a ghostwriter, has written or coauthored books on computer science, the paranormal, criminology, and science fiction novels. With Ethan Phillips, he authored the Star Trek Cookbook. Birnes approached Phillips to write the book. As a writer of popular nonfiction, he co-authored The Riverman with detective/academic Robert D. Keppel (1995), an account of serial killer Ted Bundy's involvement in the apprehension of Green River Killer Gary Ridgway. The book was adapted into a made-for-TV film (2004) on A&E, The Riverman. His coauthored book about Mickey Rooney with Richard A. Lertzman was described by Publishers Weekly as the "definitive biography".

=== Ufology ===
Birnes ghostwrote The Day After Roswell (1998), credited to Philip J. Corso, which appeared on The New York Times Best Seller List for three weeks, peaking at number twelve on the list. According to Birnes, he spent two years working on the book with Corso. They had initially wanted to do a memoir based on his military experiences, but when Corso referenced UFOs during their conversations, Birnes found what he said "compelling enough for its own book".

He was the publisher of UFO Magazine out of Los Angeles, and also wrote for the magazine. He is the lead investigator on the History Channel show UFO Hunters. Birnes believes that Earth has been visited by many different types of extraterrestrials, and that pictures taken by NASA have been airbrushed to remove any evidence of alien activity. Birnes speculates that NASA may have taken missions to the Moon after Apollo 17, but these missions were kept secret from the public due to alien interference and new-found extraterrestrial artifacts. Birnes claims that NASA made three additional trips to the Moon; Apollo 18, Apollo 19, and Apollo 20. Additionally, he claims that the Apollo 13 incident was actually an extraterrestrial attack meant to scare humans away from landing on the Moon.

Birnes's credibility was questioned when a UFO sighting over Morris County, New Jersey, on January 5, 2009, was later revealed to be the result of a hoax. The sighting was featured on an episode of UFO Hunters, and Birnes dismissed reports that witnesses saw flares attached to balloons, claiming instead that the movement of lights ruled out the possibility of flares, "a theory "UFO Hunters" has already tested and proven implausible". But on April Fool's Day 2009, two college students, Joe Rudy and Chris Russo, admitted that they had deliberately launched balloons tied to flares near the local airport on January 5 as a "social experiment on how to create your own media event surrounding UFO sightings...to show everyone how unreliable eyewitness accounts are, along with investigators of UFOs." A review of UFO Hunters by Neil Genzlinger said "Mr. Birnes and his colleagues add to the campy feel of the series by not being very good actors, trying in vain to make the discoveries that they no doubt researched ahead of time appear spontaneous on camera." Birnes later wrote two books with the same name as the show documenting his experiences with it.

In addition to UFO Hunters, he has appeared on the History Channel's television documentary series Ancient Aliens (2009–2013).

== Bibliography ==
- Selling at the Top: The 100 Best Companies in America to Sell for (1985) with Gary Markman
- McGraw-Hill Personal Computer Programming Encyclopedia: Languages and Operating Systems (1985), editor
- ACOA's Guide to Raising Healthy Children: A Parenting Handbook for the Adult Children of Alcoholics (1988) with James Mastrich
- McGraw-Hill Personal Computer Programming Encyclopedia: Languages and Operating Systems (1989) 2nd edition, editor
- PC Hardware and Systems Implementation (1989), editor
- High-Level Languages and Software Applications (1989), editor
- The Microcomputer Applications Handbook (1989), editor
- Online Programming Languages and Assemblers (1989), editor
- Strong Enough for Two: How to Overcome Codependence and Other Enabling Behavior and Take Control of Your Life (1990) with Jim Mastrich
- The Riverman: Ted Bundy and I Hunt for the Green River Killer (1995) with Robert D. Keppel
- The Day After Roswell (1998) with Philip J. Corso ISBN 0-671-00461-1
- Star Trek Cookbook (1999) with Ethan Phillips
- Unsolved UFO Mysteries (2000) with Harold Burt
- The Psychology of Serial Killer Investigations: The Grisly Business Unit (2003) with Robert D. Keppel
- The Haunting of the Presidents: A Paranormal History of the U.S. Presidency (2003) with Joel Martin
- The UFO Magazine UFO Encyclopedia (2004)
- Signature Killers: Interpreting the Calling Cards of the Serial Murderer (2007) with Robert D. Keppel
- Space Wars: The First Six Hours of World War III (2007) with William B. Scott, Michael J. Coumatos ISBN 0-7653-1087-2
- Worker in the Light: Unlock Your Five Senses And Liberate Your Limitless Potential (2008) with George Noory
- Serial Violence: Analysis of Modus Operandi and Signature Characteristics of Killers (2008) with Robert D. Keppel
- The Haunting of America: From the Salem Witch Trials to Harry Houdini (2009) with Joel Martin & George Noory
- Journey to the Light: Find Your Spiritual Self and Enter Into a World of Infinite Opportunity (2009) with George Noory
- Counterspace: The Next Hours of World War III (2009) with William B. Scott & Michael J. Coumatos
- UFO Hunters (2009)
- The Haunting of America: From the Salem Witch Trials to Harry Houdini (2009) with Joel Martin
- Aliens in America: A UFO Hunter's Guide to Extraterrestrial Hotpspots Across the U.S. (2010)
- The Everything UFO Book: An investigation of sightings, cover-ups, and the quest for extra-terrestrial life (2011)
- Suicidal Mass Murderers: A Criminological Study of Why They Kill (2011) with John Liebert
- George Noory's Late-Night Snacks: Winning Recipes for Late-Night Radio Listening (2013) with George Noory
- The Haunting of Twenty-First-Century America (2013) with Joel Martin
- Dr. Feelgood: The Shocking Story of the Doctor Who May Have Changed History by Treating and Drugging JFK, Marilyn, Elvis, and Other Prominent Figures (2013) with Richard Lertzman
- Hearts of Darkness: Why Kids Are Becoming Mass Murderers and How We Can Stop It (2014) with John Liebert
- The Life and Times of Mickey Rooney (2015) with Richard Lertzman
- Wounded Minds: Understanding and Solving the Growing Menace of Post-Traumatic Stress Disorder (2016) with John Liebert
- Edison's Quest to Talk to the Dead: The Unexpected Final Creation of the World's Greatest Inventor (2016) with Joel Martin
- Psychiatric Criminology: A Roadmap for Rapid Assessment (2016) with John Liebert
- UFO Hunters Book Two: The Official Companion to the Hit Television Series (2016)
- Beyond Columbo: The Life and Times of Peter Falk (2017) with Richard Lertzman
- Edison v. Tesla: The Battle Over Their Last Invention (2017) with Joel Martin
- UFOs and The White House: What Did Our Presidents Know and When Did They Know It? (2018)
