= Clapham Wood =

Woodland area in Clapham, West Sussex, England

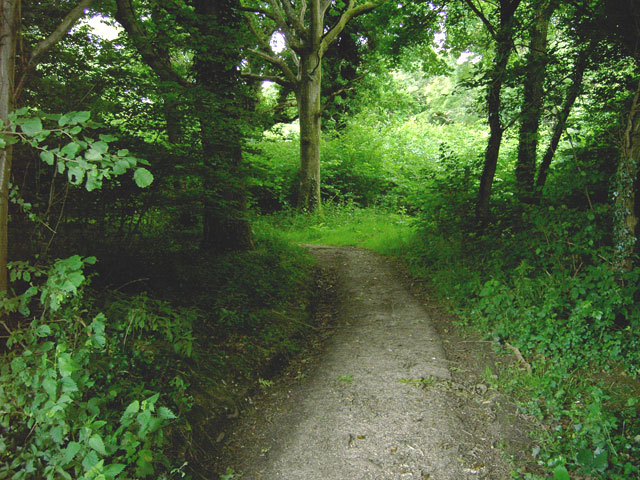
- Interactive map of Clapham Wood
- Location: West Sussex, England
- Coordinates: 50.8533°N 0.4405°W

Clapham Wood is a woodland area in the South Downs National Park near the village of Clapham, West Sussex, England. It is a designated Site of Nature Conservation Interest (SNCI) composed of ancient, semi-natural woodland with rich flora and fauna. It is a popular location for walkers in easy reach from nearby Durrington and Worthing and is well provided with wide paths through the mixed and coppiced woodland. The southern parts of the woodland are popular in the spring, with extensive carpets of bluebells growing close to the paths. There are views of the English Channel to the south, and of the dry valley Long Furlong, with Blackpatch Hill and long barrows beyond, to the north.

== Clapham to Burpham Downs Biodiversity Opportunity Area ==
The Clapham Woods SNCI has been made a designated site within the Clapham to Burpham Downs Biodiversity Opportunity Area (BOA) by the Sussex Biodiversity Partnership. The ancient woodlands are situated on downlands geology and there are areas of lowland calcareous grassland within and around the woods. The wood has a wide range of plants including Sanicle, Wild Strawberry, Early Purple Orchid and the locally rare Tuberous Comfrey. There is a tree preservation order covering the whole of the wood.

== Folklore ==
Myths and rumors about Clapham Wood began in 1975 when paranormal enthusiasts capitalized on local reports of dogs lost in the area by claiming that "mysterious forces" were present in the Wood. They promoted claims that aliens piloting UFOs had captured the dogs, and later that a local witch was responsible. Proliferation of such rumors gave residents a dislike for the area and attracted outsiders seeking "psychic adventures". Bodies found in Clapham Wood over the same decade also led to unsubstantiated claims of paranormal experiences and UFO sightings.
