= Citizens Against UFO Secrecy =

Citizens Against UFO Secrecy (CAUS)
- Company type: Non-profit organization
- Founded: 1977
- Headquarters: Scottsdale, Arizona
- Key people: Peter Gersten
- Website: www.caus.org

Citizens Against UFO Secrecy (CAUS) was a freedom of information activist group that advocated for the release of classified information regarding UFOs.

== Agenda ==
Citizens Against UFO Secrecy (CAUS) was a non-profit organization formed in 1977 to advocate for the release of information, through the use of the Freedom of Information Act (FOIA), regarding UFOs that had been classified by federal and state governments. According to the organization's website: "Citizens Against UFO Secrecy (CAUS) is an Arizona based, public interest organization which is formed upon four principles: 1. CAUS believes that this planet, and the people on it, are interacting and in contact with a non-human form of intelligence; 2. CAUS is against any and all secrecy surrounding, involving and relating to this contact; 3. CAUS believes that the people have an absolute and unconditional right to know about this contact; and 4. CAUS believes that it is through the judicial process that the truth will be set free and secrecy ended".

== Activities ==
Peter Gersten, former director of CAUS, is a criminal defense attorney who in 1977 brought suit against the Central Intelligence Agency (CIA) using FOIA. As a result, over nine hundred UFO documents were provided by the CIA in 1979. One year later Gersten brought a suit against the US National Security Agency (NSA) through CAUS. On November 18, 1980, in response to an NSA affidavit, the judge denied release of the documents.

In 1983 CAUS filed a writ of habeas corpus in the U.S. District Court in the District of Columbia, with petition filer Larry Bryant stating, "We want the bodies [of extraterrestrials]." Bryant also filed a suit against James S. Gilmore, governor of Virginia, for the release of information related to "the clandestine invasion of UFOs within Virginia." CAUS lost the case.

Gersten, who has been described by ufologists as "UFOlogy's foremost ambulance chaser" and has been accused of "turn[ing] the once respectable CAUS into a fringe new age association," was in 2012 reported to be intending to jump off Bell Rock in Sedona, Arizona, with Gersten saying, "I believe that some type of cosmic portal will be opening at that time and place and that an opportunity will present itself. I fully expect that it will either lead to the next level of this cosmic program; freedom from an imprisoning time-loop; a magical Martian-like bubble; or something equally as exotic." Gersten "wandered home" when his predicted vortex did not appear.

As of 2023 CAUS is listed as an inactive organization, with its non-profit status revoked.
