= Gary Ridgway =

American serial killer (born 1949)

- Ridgway in 2024
- Born: Gary Leon Ridgway; February 18, 1949 (age 77); Salt Lake City, Utah, U.S.
- Other names: The Green River Killer; The Green River Strangler
- Spouses: Claudia Kraig Barrows (m. 1970; div. 1972) Marcia Lorene Brown (m. 1973; div. 1981) Judith Lorraine Lynch (m. 1988; div. 2002)
- Children: 1
- Convictions: Aggravated first degree murder (49 counts); Tampering with evidence (48 counts); Solicitation
- Penalty: 49 consecutive life sentences without the possibility of parole

Details
- Span of crimes: 1982 – 1998 confirmed (possibly as recent as 2001)
- Country: United States
- States: Washington, Oregon
- Killed: 49 confirmed, 22 others suspected
- Date apprehended: November 30, 2001
- Imprisoned at: Washington State Penitentiary

Gary Leon Ridgway (born February 18, 1949), known as the Green River Killer or the Green River Strangler, is an American serial killer who was convicted of murdering forty-nine women between 1982 and 1998 in the northwestern United States. At the time of his arrest in 2001, he was believed to be the most prolific serial killer in United States history, according to confirmed murders. (Note: In addition to his confirmed murders, Ridgway has been linked to at least twenty-two other murders. Later, convicted serial killer Samuel Little would claim to have murdered more than ninety people, with sixty of those cases being verified. Some people, most notably Ted Bundy, are widely thought to have killed more people than they were convicted of murdering; Bundy confessed to thirty murders, but some believe he may have murdered more than a hundred people.)

Most of Ridgway's victims were alleged prostitutes or other women in vulnerable circumstances, including underage runaways. Prior to his capture, media outlets dubbed him the Green River Killer or the Green River Strangler, named for the location of the bodies of his first five victims, the Green River in Washington state. Ridgway strangled his victims, usually by hand, but sometimes using ligatures. After strangling them, he would dump their bodies in forested and overgrown areas, often returning to the bodies to engage in acts of necrophilia.

Ridgway had been a suspect in the Green River case since 1982; however, investigators were unable to link him to the murders at that time. Later advances in DNA profiling allowed investigators to definitively link Ridgway to the murders, and he was arrested on November 30, 2001, as he was leaving the Kenworth truck factory where he worked in Renton, Washington. As part of a plea bargain wherein he agreed to disclose the locations of still-missing women, he was spared the death penalty and received a sentence of life imprisonment without the possibility of parole.

== Early life ==
Gary Ridgway was born on February 18, 1949, in Salt Lake City, Utah, the second of three sons to Thomas and Mary Ridgway. His childhood was somewhat troubled; relatives later described his mother as a domineering woman who inflicted corporal punishment upon her sons for minor offenses. Mary also worked in the men's department at JCPenney, and upon arrival home, would frequently complain about the lack of comportment in the clientele of the store. Ridgway would later tell defense psychologists that, as an adolescent, he had conflicting feelings of anger and sexual attraction toward his mother, and fantasized about killing her. Ridgway's father, whose marriage to Ridgway's mother was volatile, worked as a bus driver and often complained about the presence of prostitutes on his route.

Ridgway, who is dyslexic, was held back a year in high school and exhibited an IQ recorded as being in the "low eighties." When he was aged 16, Ridgway lured a six-year-old boy into a woodland and stabbed him through the ribs into his liver; the boy survived the attack.

== Adult life ==
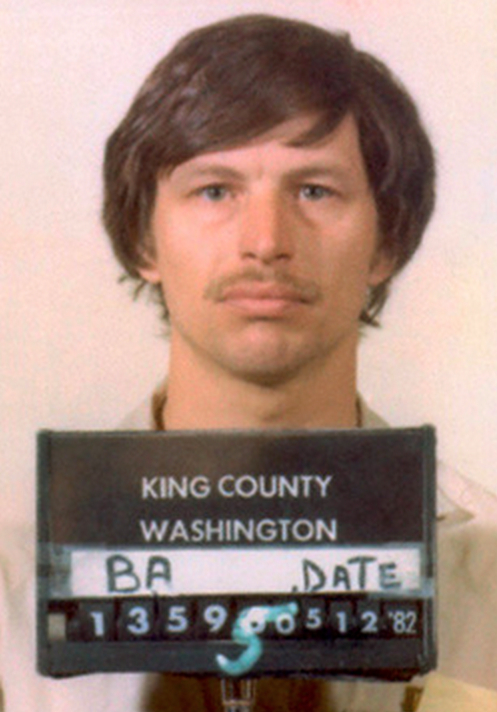
Ridgway in 1982

Ridgway graduated from Tyee High School in 1969 and married his 19-year-old high school sweetheart, Claudia Kraig. He joined the United States Navy and was deployed to Vietnam, where he served on board a supply ship and saw combat. During his time in the military, Ridgway frequently had sex with prostitutes and contracted gonorrhea; although Kraig was angered by this, he continued this activity without protection. His marriage to Kraig ended within a year.

When questioned about Ridgway after his arrest, friends and family described him as friendly but strange. His first two marriages resulted in divorce because of infidelities by both partners. His second wife, Marcia Winslow, claimed that he had placed her in a chokehold. Ridgway became religious during his second marriage, proselytizing door-to-door, reading the Bible aloud at work and at home, and insisting that his wife follow the strict teachings of their pastor. He would also frequently cry after reading the Bible or hearing sermons. Despite his beliefs, Ridgway continued to solicit the services of prostitutes and asked his wife to participate in sex in public or in inappropriate places, sometimes even in areas where his victims' bodies were later discovered.

According to women in his life, Ridgway had an insatiable sexual appetite. His three ex-wives and several ex-girlfriends reported that he demanded sex from them several times a day. He would often want to have sex in a public area or in the woods.

Ridgway admitted to having a fixation with prostitutes, with whom he had love/hate relationships. He frequently complained about their presence in his neighborhood, but he also took advantage of their services regularly. In a statement read at his plea hearing, Ridgway said he hated prostitutes and did not want to pay them for sex. Some have speculated that Ridgway was torn between his lusts and his staunch religious beliefs. Ridgeway had a son with his second wife, Marcia.

== Murders ==
Throughout the 1980s and 1990s, Ridgway is believed to have murdered at least 71 teenage girls and women near Seattle and Tacoma, Washington. In court statements, Ridgway later reported that he had killed so many that he lost count. A majority of the murders occurred between 1982 and 1984. The victims were believed to be either prostitutes or runaways, whom he picked up along Pacific Highway South. Ridgway sometimes showed the women a picture of his son, to trick them into trusting him. They would engage in sexual activity, and after minutes of intercourse from behind, Ridgway would wrap his forearm around the front of their necks and use the other arm to pull back as tightly as he could, strangling them. He killed most victims in his home, his truck, or a secluded area. Most of their bodies were dumped in wooded areas around the Green River, Seattle–Tacoma International Airport, and other "dump sites" within South King County.

There were also two confirmed and another two suspected victims found in the Portland, Oregon, area. The bodies were often left in clusters, sometimes posed, usually nude. He would sometimes return to the victims' bodies and engage in necrophilia with them. Ridgway later explained that he did not find necrophilia more sexually satisfying, but having sex with the deceased reduced his need to obtain a living victim and thus limited his exposure to being caught. Ridgway occasionally contaminated the dump sites with gum, cigarettes, and written materials belonging to others, and he even transported a few victims' remains across state lines into Oregon, to confuse the police.

=== 1982–1984: First known victims ===
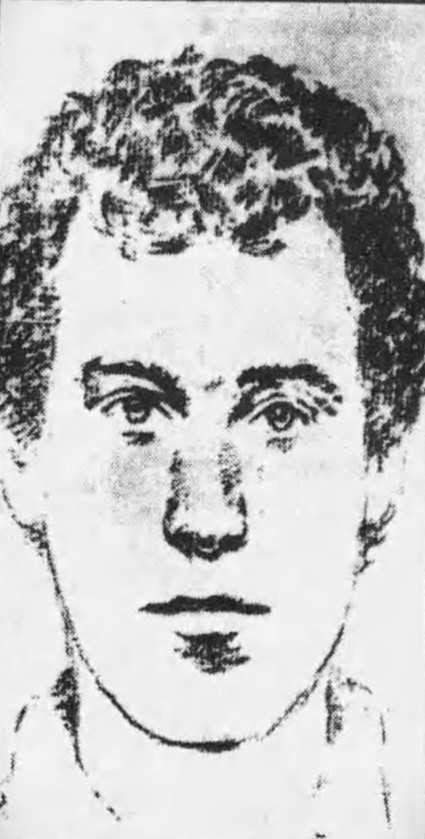
1983 sketch of the suspected killer

The body of Ridgway's first known victim was found in July 1982. A unique kind of spray paint was found on clothing wrapped around the victim's neck, but the paint was not tested for 20 years. If it had been tested at the time, it would have been easier to link the murder to Ridgway. After four more victims were found, the King County Sheriff's Office formed the Green River Task Force to investigate the murders. Task force members included Robert D. Keppel and Dave Reichert, who periodically interviewed incarcerated serial killer Ted Bundy in 1984. Bundy offered his opinions on the psychology, motivations, and behavior of the killer. He suggested that the killer was revisiting the dump sites to have sex with his victims, which turned out to be accurate, and if police found a fresh grave, they should stake it out and wait for him to come back. Also contributing to the investigation was FBI Special Agent John E. Douglas, who developed a profile of the suspect.

Ridgway was arrested in 1982 and 2001 on charges related to prostitution. He became a suspect in the Green River killings in 1983, when 18-year-old Marie Malvar disappeared. Her boyfriend and her pimp later found a truck in front of Ridgway's house, which they thought was the same one she had boarded the day she went missing. Ridgway was interviewed in conjunction with that event, and police received several other tips that mentioned him. In 1984, he passed a polygraph test.

=== 1985–2001: Marriage to Judith Mawson, arrest for murder ===
Around 1985, Ridgway began dating Judith Mawson, who became his third wife in 1988. Mawson claimed in a 2010 television interview that when she moved into his house while they were dating, there was no carpet. Detectives later told her he had probably wrapped a body in the carpet. In the same interview, she described how he would leave for work early in the morning some days, ostensibly for the overtime pay. Mawson speculated that he must have committed some of the murders while supposedly working these early morning shifts. She claimed that she had not suspected Ridgway's crimes before she was contacted by authorities in 1987, and had not even heard of the Green River Killer before that time because she did not watch the news. Ridgway said that while he was in a relationship with Mawson, his kill rate went down and that he truly loved her. Of his 49 known victims, only three were killed after he married Mawson. Mawson told a local television reporter, "I feel I have saved lives ... by being his wife and making him happy."

In April 1987, police took hair and saliva samples from Ridgway. The samples collected were later subjected to DNA profiling, providing the evidence for his arrest warrant.

On November 30, 2001, he was at the Kenworth truck factory where he worked as a spray painter when police arrived to arrest him. The four victims named in the original indictment were Marcia Chapman, Opal Mills, Cynthia Hinds, and Carol Ann Christensen. Three more victims—Wendy Coffield, Debra Bonner, and Debra Estes—were added to the indictment after a forensic scientist identified microscopic spray paint spheres as a specific brand and composition of paint used at the Kenworth factory during the time when these victims were killed.

== Plea bargain, confessions, sentencing ==
Early in August 2003, Seattle television news reported that Ridgway had been moved from a maximum security cell at King County Jail to an Airway Heights Minimum-Medium Security Level Tank. Other news reports stated that his lawyers, led by Anthony Savage, were closing a plea bargain that would spare him the death penalty in return for his confession to a number of the Green River murders.

On November 5, 2003, Ridgway pleaded "guilty" to 48 charges of aggravated first degree murder as part of a plea bargain that would spare him execution in exchange for his cooperation in locating the remains of his victims and providing other details. In his statement accompanying his guilty plea, Ridgway explained that he had killed all of his victims inside King County, Washington, and that he had transported and dumped the remains of the two women near Portland to confuse the police.

Deputy prosecutor Jeffrey Baird noted in court that the deal contained "the names of 41 victims who would not be the subject of State v. Ridgway if it were not for the plea agreement". King County Prosecuting Attorney Norm Maleng explained his decision to make the deal:

We could have gone forward with seven counts, but that is all we could have ever hoped to solve. At the end of that trial, whatever the outcome, there would have been lingering doubts about the rest of these crimes. This agreement was the avenue to the truth. And in the end, the search for the truth is still why we have a criminal justice system ... Gary Ridgway does not deserve our mercy. He does not deserve to live. The mercy provided by today's resolution is directed not at Ridgway, but toward the families who have suffered so much ...

On December 18, 2003, King County Superior Court Judge Richard A. Jones sentenced Ridgway to 48 life sentences without the possibility of parole to be served consecutively. He was also sentenced to an additional 10 years for tampering with evidence for each of the 48 victims, adding 480 years to his 48 life sentences. Later he was given another life sentence after the remains of his 49th victim were found.

Ridgway led prosecutors to three bodies in 2003. On August 16 of that year, the remains of a 16-year-old girl found near Enumclaw, Washington, 40 feet from State Route 410, were pronounced as belonging to Pammy Annette Avent, who had been believed to be a victim of the Green River Killer. The remains of Marie Malvar and April Buttram were found in September 2003.

On November 23, 2005, the Associated Press reported that a weekend hiker found the skull of one of the women Ridgway admitted murdering in his 2003 plea bargain with King County prosecutors. The skull of another victim, Tracy Winston, who was 19 when she disappeared from Northgate Mall on September 12, 1983, was found on November 20, 2005, by a man hiking in a wooded area near Highway 18 near Issaquah, southeast of Seattle. This was the find that led to Ridgway's 49th life sentence. In 2023, remains discovered in 1985 and known as Bones 17 were identified as belonging to 15-year-old Lori Anne Razpotnik, who was last seen by her family in Lewis County, Washington, in November 1982.

Ridgway confessed to more confirmed murders than any other American serial killer. Over a period of five months of police and prosecutor interviews, he confessed to 48 murders, 42 of which were on the police's list of probable Green River Killer victims. On February 9, 2004, county prosecutors began to release the videotaped records of Ridgway's confession. In one taped interview, he initially told investigators that he was responsible for the deaths of 65 women. In another taped interview on December 31, 2003, Ridgway claimed to have murdered 71 victims and confessed to having had sex with them before killing them, a detail which he did not reveal until after his sentencing.

In his confession, he acknowledged that he targeted prostitutes, because they were "easy to pick up" and that he "hated most of them." He confessed that he had sex with his victims' bodies after he murdered them, but claimed he began burying the later victims so that he could resist the urge to commit necrophilia.

== Incarceration ==
Ridgway was placed in solitary confinement at Washington State Penitentiary in Walla Walla in January 2004. On May 14, 2015, he was transferred to the USP Florence High, a high-security federal prison east of Cañon City, Colorado. In September 2015, after a public outcry and discussions with Governor Jay Inslee, Corrections Secretary Bernie Warner announced that Ridgway would be transferred back to Washington to be "easily accessible" for open murder investigations. Ridgway was returned by chartered plane to Washington State Penitentiary in Walla Walla from USP Florence High, on October 24, 2015. In September 2024, Ridgway was briefly transferred from the Washington State Penitentiary to the King County jail for a few days before being transferred back to WSP. Authorities refused to give any explanation for the transfer. The transport order was unsealed in March 2025, revealing that Ridgway was temporarily transferred to help locate more victim remains.

In December 2025, Tacoma radio station KIRO-FM reported on five anonymous sources that Ridgway was receiving end-of-life care in prison. However, speaking to Fox 13 Seattle – KCPQ, a director of the Department of Corrections (DOC) said those allegations were inaccurate and said that nothing has changed in Ridgway's existing health conditions. Another official from the DOC refuted these claims too in a request for comment by Us Weekly, adding that "despite [Ridgway's] health issues", he is not under hospice care. Former King County Sheriff Dave Reichert said that speculations probably stemmed from a photograph showing Ridgway in a wheelchair in 2024. Reichert called Ridgway a "pathological liar [who] at times didn't know truth from lie", and confirmed that King County continues to work in missing person and cold cases presumably linked to Ridgway.

== Victims ==
Before Ridgway's confession, authorities had attributed 49 murders to the Green River Killer. Ridgway confessed to murdering at least 71 victims.

=== Confirmed killings ===
At the time of Ridgway's December 18, 2003, sentencing, authorities had been able to find at least 48 sets of remains, including victims not originally attributed to the Green River Killer. Ridgway was sentenced for the deaths of each of these 48 victims, with a plea agreement that he would "plead guilty to any and all future cases (in King County) where his confession could be corroborated by reliable evidence."

#	Name	Age	Disappeared	Body found
1	Wendy Lee Coffield	16	July 8, 1982	July 15, 1982
2	Gisele Ann Lovvorn	17	July 17, 1982	September 25, 1982
3	Debra Lynn Bonner	23	July 25, 1982	August 12, 1982
4	Marcia Fay Chapman	31	August 1, 1982	August 15, 1982
5	Cynthia Jean Hinds	17	August 11, 1982	August 15, 1982
6	Opal Charmaine Mills	16	August 12, 1982	August 15, 1982
7	Terry Rene Milligan	16	August 29, 1982	April 1, 1984
8	Mary Bridget Meehan	18	September 15, 1982	November 13, 1983
9	Debra Lorraine Estes	15	September 20, 1982	May 30, 1988
10	Linda Jane Rule	16	September 26, 1982	January 31, 1983
11	Denise Darcel Bush	23	October 8, 1982	June 12, 1985
12	Shawnda Leea Summers	16	October 9, 1982	August 11, 1983
13	Shirley Marie Sherrill	18	October 20–22, 1982	June 14, 1985
14	Lori Anne Razpotnik	15	c. November 26, 1982	December 1985
15	Rebecca "Becky" Marrero	20	December 3, 1982	December 21, 2010
16	Colleen Renee Brockman	15	December 24, 1982	May 26, 1984
17	Sandra Denise Major	20	December 24, 1982	December 30, 1985
18	Wendy Marie Stephens	14	March 1983 (Note: Stephens was reported missing in 1983. Investigators believe her remains had lain undiscovered for one year or more prior to their March 1984 discovery.)	March 21, 1984
19	Alma Ann Smith	18	March 3, 1983	April 2, 1984
20	Delores LaVerne Williams	17	March 8–14, 1983	March 31, 1984
21	Gail Lynn Mathews	23	April 10, 1983	September 18, 1983
22	Andrea Marion Childers	19	April 14, 1983	October 11, 1989
23	Sandra Kay Gabbert	17	April 17, 1983	April 1, 1984
24	Kimi-Kai Ryks Pitsor	16	April 17, 1983	December 15, 1983
25	Mary-Jane Malvar	18	April 30, 1983	September 26, 2003
26	Carol Ann Christensen	21	May 3, 1983	May 8, 1983
27	Martina Theresa Authorlee	18	May 22, 1983	November 14, 1984
28	Cheryl Lee Wims	18	May 23, 1983	March 22, 1984
29	Yvonne Antosh	19	May 31, 1983	October 15, 1983
30	Carrie Ann Rois	15	May 31 – June 13, 1983	March 10, 1985
31	Constance Elizabeth Naon	19	June 8, 1983	October 27, 1983
32	Tammie Charlene Liles	16	June 9, 1983	April 23, 1985
33	Kelly Marie Ware	22	July 18, 1983	October 29, 1983
34	Tina Marie Thompson	21	July 25, 1983	April 20, 1984
35	April Dawn Buttram	16	August 18, 1983	August 30, 2003
36	Debbie May Abernathy	26	September 5, 1983	March 31, 1984
37	Tracy Ann Winston	19	September 12, 1983	March 27, 1986
38	Maureen Sue Feeney	19	September 28, 1983	May 2, 1986
39	Mary Sue Bello	25	October 11, 1983	October 12, 1984
40	Pammy Annette Avent	15	October 26, 1983	August 16, 2003
41	Delise Louise Plager	22	October 30, 1983	February 14, 1984
42	Kimberly Nelson	21	November 1, 1983	June 14, 1986
43	Lisa Lorraine Yates	19	December 23, 1983	March 13, 1984
44	Mary Exzetta West	16	February 6, 1984	September 8, 1985
45	Cindy Anne Smith	17	March 21, 1984	June 27, 1987
46	Patricia Michelle Barczak	19	October 17, 1986	February 3, 1993
47	Roberta Joseph Hayes	21	February 7, 1987	September 11, 1991
48	Marta Reeves	36	March 5, 1990	September 20, 1990
49	Patricia Ann Yellowrobe	38	January 1998	August 6, 1998

Footnotes

- Before Ridgway's confession, authorities had not attributed to the Green River Killer the deaths of victims Rule, Barczak, Hayes, Reeves, Yellowrobe, and Jane Doe B-20.
- On December 21, 2010, hikers near the West Valley Highway in Auburn, Washington, found a skull in the vicinity of where Marie Malvar's remains had been found in 2003. The skull was identified as belonging to Marrero, who was last seen leaving the Western Six Motel at South 168th Street and Pacific Highway South on December 3, 1982. The King County Prosecutor confirmed that Ridgway would be formally charged with her murder on February 11, 2011. On February 18, 2011, he entered a guilty plea in the murder of Rebecca Marrero, adding a 49th life sentence to his existing 48. Ridgway confessed to murdering Marrero in his original plea bargain, but due to insufficient evidence, the charges could not be filed. Therefore, there is no change in his current incarceration status.
- The remains of Winston were found, without a skull, in Kent's Cottonwood Grove Park in March 1986. Winston's skull was found in November 2005 near Tiger Mountain, miles away from the discovery site of the rest of her body. Police assume someone carried it to the location.
- Major was not identified until June 2012. A family member asked the King County Sheriff to investigate after seeing a TV movie about Ridgway. DNA confirmed Major's identity.
- Wendy Stephens, previously known as Jane Doe B-10, was previously unidentified. Ridgway claimed that she was a white female in her early 20s and possibly had brown hair. Examination of the remains suggested that she was actually between 12 and 18, most likely around 15. She was later confirmed to be 14. Analysis of the victim's skeleton indicated she was probably left-handed, and she had at one point in her life had a skull fracture to the left temple that later healed.
- Jane Doe B-17 was discovered on January 2, 1986; remains that had been found in another area February 18, 1984, were later matched to this victim. In 2003, Ridgway claimed responsibility for her death. In December 2023, DNA testing at Parabon NanoLabs identified the victim as Lori Anne Razpotnik, who had run away from home in 1982 at age 15.
- Jane Doe B-20 was discovered in August 2003. Because the remains were partial, her face could not be reconstructed and her race could not be determined, but she was estimated to have been between 13 and 24 at the time of her death. She was estimated to have been murdered between 1970 and 1993, but she was believed to have been murdered during the first decade of Ridgway's murder spree. In January 2024, DNA testing identified the victim as Liles. A separate set of remains from Liles had been found in Oregon in 1985 and identified in 1988 from dental records.

=== Task force victims list ===
Ridgway is suspected of—but not charged with—murdering the remaining six victims of the original list attributed to the Green River Killer.

Name	Age	Disappeared	Body found
Amina Agisheff	35	July 7, 1982	April 18, 1984
Kasee Ann Lee	16	August 28, 1982	Undiscovered
Kelly Kay McGinniss (Note: Various spellings exist of McGinniss's name, such as "Keli/Kelli" and "McGinness".)	18	June 28, 1983	Undiscovered
Angela Marie Girdner	16	July 1983	April 22, 1985
Patricia Osborn	19	October 20, 1983	Undiscovered

Footnotes

- Ridgway denied killing Agisheff who does not fit the profile of any of the victims of the Green River Killer considering her age, and she was not a prostitute or a teenage runaway.
- Although he has never been charged with her murder, during police interrogations in 2003, Ridgway did confess to killing Lee. He stated that he strangled Lee in 1982 and left her body near a drive-in theatre off of the Sea-Tac Strip. Law enforcement officials have been unable to locate Lee's remains at the dumpsite that Ridgway indicated.
- Evidence exists to suggest that Ridgway murdered McGinniss. Shortly before her disappearance, McGinniss was questioned by a Port of Seattle police officer while "dating" Ridgway near the SeaTac Strip. Furthermore, during the summer of 2003, Ridgway led authorities to the bodies of several of his victims. One of those bodies, later identified as that of April Buttram, was initially identified by Ridgway as being that of McGinniss. According to Ridgway, he often confused McGinniss with Buttram because of their similar physiques.
- Ridgway is a suspect in the death of Girdner whose remains were discovered within a mile of the bodies of known victims Sherrill, Bush, and Liles. Girdner remained unidentified until October 2009.

=== Suspected ===
Name	Age	Disappeared	Body found
Unidentified black female	Unknown	December 1980	Undiscovered
Kristi Lynn Vorak	13	October 31, 1982	Undiscovered
Patricia Ann Leblanc	15	August 12, 1983	Undiscovered
Rose Marie Kurran (Note: Kurran's name is alternatively spelled as "Curran" in the media.)	16	August 26, 1987	August 31, 1987
Cora Christmas McGuirk	22	July 12, 1991	Undiscovered

Footnotes

- An unidentified black female, possibly bearing the first name Michelle, was a possible victim of Ridgway. She has never been located or identified.
- McGuirk was the mother of NBA player Martell Webster. She was last seen leaving her three children in the company of her aunt. Her vehicle was later found near Aurora Avenue North. Although her body was never found, Ridgway is thought to be responsible for killing her.
- Ridgway was long suspected for the 1987 murder of Kurran, a 16-year-old addict and prostitute, but was ruled out as a suspect.

== See also ==
- List of serial killers in the United States
