= Peter Brookesmith =

British writer

Peter Brookesmith (born 1946) is an English writer on paranormal topics, especially the belief in UFOs. He has appeared often in the Fortean Times as well as speaking at their UnConvention.

== Bibliography ==
- Brookesmith, Peter (ed.) (1984) The UFO Casebook: Startling Cases and Astonishing Photographs of Encounters with Flying Saucers. Orbis Publishing
- Brookesmith, Peter (1995) Cult and Occult. Guild Publishing
- Brookesmith, Peter (1995) UFO: The Complete Sightings. New York: Barnes & Noble Books
- Brookesmith, Peter (1996) UFO: The Government Files. New York: Barnes & Noble Books
- Brookesmith, Peter (1998) Alien Abductions. New York: Barnes & Noble Books
