= Younger Dryas impact hypothesis =

Fringe hypothesis about a North American comet impact

The Younger Dryas impact hypothesis (YDIH) is a fringe hypothesis that posits that the cause of the disruption of the Atlantic meridional overturning circulation resulting in the onset of the Younger Dryas cooling c. 12,900 years Before Present, was the result of an impact or air burst of a meteor, possibly a comet. The hypothesis has been widely rejected by most relevant experts due to lack of clear evidence for any such impact, with claimed evidence described as self-contradictory, inconsistent, omitting contradictory information, and "sometimes defying the laws of physics." Mainstream hypothesis instead attribute the Younger Dryas onset either to a sudden massive influx of glacial meltwater into the Atlantic Ocean from North America, or to volcanism.

YDIH has been popularized in non-academic (particularly conspiracist) circles through its inclusion in several documentaries about ancient history on popular science television, and pseudoscientific books by author Graham Hancock. Hancock's pseudoarchaeological theories involving YDIH were the subject of an episode of the Netflix docuseries Ancient Apocalypse in 2022.

YDIH's proponents founded a non-profit, Comet Research Group Inc., to fund research into impacts such as the one proposed by YDIH. One of CRG's most well-known studies into a hypothesized impact at the archaeological site Tell el-Hammam and the claim that it was the ruins of a Biblical city destroyed in the Book of Genesis by God, Sodom, was found to contain manipulated data after it was published in 2021. It was retracted in 2025 by Scientific Reports and was the second retraction by the publication from CRG members.

== History ==
The first proposal that a comet struck North America at the end of the last ice age was introduced in the 19th century by the populist politician and conspiracist Ignatius Donnelly as an alternative hypothesis to glaciation. In his 1883 book Ragnarok, he posited that such an impact explained clay and gravel deposits spread across North America as a result of the cometic collision and that it had wiped out the fictional lost civilization of Atlantis.

The YDIH was formally introduced in 2007 by nuclear physicist Richard Firestone and collaborators in the Proceedings of the National Academy of Sciences of the United States of America with the paper titled "Evidence for an extraterrestrial impact 12,900 years ago that contributed to the megafaunal extinctions and the Younger Dryas cooling." Prior to that publishing, in 2001, Firestone and archaeologist William Topping published their first version of YDIH, "Terrestrial Evidence of a Nuclear Catastrophe in Paleo-Indian Times" in Mammoth Trumpet, a newsletter of the Center for the Study of the First Americans.

Firestone and collaborators elaborated on the hypothesis substantially in their 2006 book The Cycle of Cosmic Catastrophes, though one of its co-authors denies the book was meant to be scientific. In the book, they argue that the impact broke an ice dam holding a massive reservoir of glacial meltwater, Lake Agassiz, causing it to flood the Atlantic Ocean with freshwater disrupting the North Atlantic Conveyor, and causing a sudden cooling event. They argue that the impact in the Great Lakes region destabilized the Laurentide ice sheet and took with it typical evidence of an impact which caused hemisphere-spanning wildfires and the North American megafauna and a Paleo-Indian extinction event, in particular the disappearance of the Clovis culture. However, genetic evidence indicates that the Clovis people migrated southward and adapted to the changes in their environment. Anthropologist Vance T. Holliday has also argued that evidence shows that there is no requisite break in the archeological record, but instead that the Clovis people did not stay in one site for very long and that Folsom points appear in the record simultaneously with the disappearance of megafauna hunting tools.

The most widely accepted cause of the Younger Dryas is massive burst of meltwater input into the Atlantic Ocean originating from the North American Laurentide Ice Sheet, as laid out in a 1989 paper in Nature led by geochemist Wallace Smith Broecker and collaborators. Paleoceanographer James Kennett is a co-author of both the 1989 paper and the 2007 YDIH paper. Volcanism has also been proposed as a alternative explanation for the Younger Dryas onset and has seen significant mainstream support among scholars. All three proposed causes are suggested to have induced the Younger Dryas by disrupting the Atlantic meridional overturning circulation.

=== Purported evidence and rebuttals ===
The 2007 paper resulted in cross-disciplinary relevant scientific rebuttals, including from many geologists, astronomers, archaeologists, and paleoecologists. This led to a back-and-forth of rebuttals in which some proponents of YDIH maintain that the opposition to the hypothesis is a minority group of vocal skeptics and conspiratorial claims of a mainstream coverup, unusual for academic conversations. Geologist Nicholas Pinter and other experts found no evidence for any such impact, failed to replicate many key evidentiary claims, and found more plausible explanations for scattered extraterrestrial material in the absence of evidence of an impact. In 2011, Pinter and collaborators set out to review and test YDIH and to present the results of such tests. They concluded that the hypothesis was rejected on the basis that the results of the 2007 study could not be reproduced and were instead a misinterpretation of data, primarily due to the fact that many of them were caused by normal geologic processes on Earth. They concluded:

In all of these cases, sparse but ubiquitous materials seem to have been misreported and misinterpreted as singular peaks at the onset of the YD. Throughout the arc of this hypothesis, recognized and expected impact markers were not found, leading to proposed YD impactors and impact processes that were novel, self-contradictory, rapidly changing, and sometimes defying the laws of physics. The YD impact hypothesis provides a cautionary tale for researchers, the scientific community, the press, and the broader public.

One of the key claims of YDIH was the finding of high concentrations of nanodiamonds found within carbonaceous spherules purported to be caused by a bolide impact; they speculated that an air burst caused by a comet hitting the atmosphere over North America would have caused the formation of the nanodiamonds. This remained the "last hope" for the hypothesis, despite the lack of an impact crater, until a study led by physicist Tyrone Daulton concluded no such nanodiamonds could be found. Another study by geophysicist Jay Melosh showed that an air burst from such an impact could not produce the amount of pressure necessary to form nanodiamonds. Instead, a 2010 study led by paleobotanist Andrew C. Scott found fossil evidence that the materials found were fungi or insect fecal pellets. Additional studies in 2016 replicated the refutation of the existence of the nanodiamond evidence.

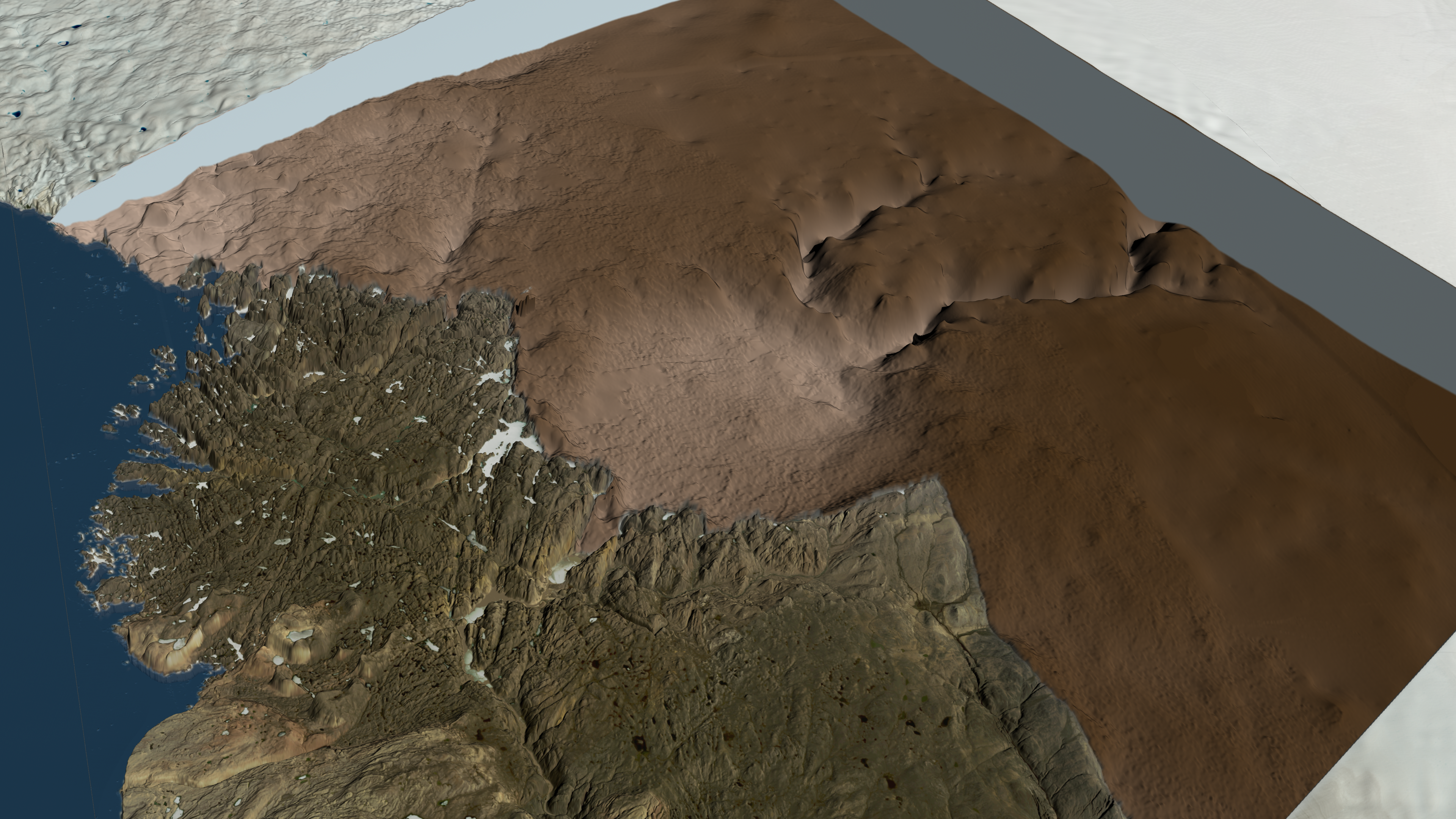
NASA digital elevation model with the ice sheet removed to show the surface of bedrock in the region around the Hiawatha Glacier

Purported evidentiary support for YDIH includes a spike of platinum in an ice core drilled out of Greenland in 2013 dated to around 13,000 years ago, and the 2015 discovery of the Hiawatha impact structure. However, in 2018 Melosh argued that it was statistically unlikely the impact was recent given that an object the size of the projectile would only collide with Earth once every few million years. He also said that it was too small to cause a catastrophic extinction event in the continental United States. A 2025 study led by volcanologist Charlotte E. Green found that the elevated platinum occurred 45 years after the onset of YD, and thus too late to support YDIH, and lasted for 14 years, which negated an instantaneous cataclysmic event. Green and her co-authors concluded instead that the platinum spike was due to sustained fissure eruptions in Iceland, which was consistent with several other previous studies. Also, the Hiawawatha impact crater has been dated to Late Paleocene (58 million years ago) using shocked zircon grains found downstream from the structure, making it unrelated to Younger Dryas.

Other evidence cited in support of YDIH includes black mats, or strata of organic-rich soil (which contained the purported nanodiamonds), and magnetic spherules that have been identified at several archaeological sites across North America. A 2009 study led by paleoecologist Jennifer Marlon examined lake sediments from a period of 10,000 to 15,000 years ago to document charcoal and pollen data during that 5,000-year period, which included the onset of YD at around its midpoint. However, no spike was found aligning with a YD boundary, and a rise in black mats were found to have preceded the onset of YD. West argued that Marlon's radiocarbon dating calibration was wrong, which Marlon dismissed due to her use of multiple sites, none of which showed any spike as required by YDIH. Similarly, a 2012 study of 13 sites in the Atacama Desert led by geologist Jeffrey Pigati found the black mats at various sites regardless of their age and location, many of which were much older than YD. Both Marlon and Pigati argued that various natural processes unrelated to an impact could explain their presence. Firestone criticized Pigati's methods, to which Pigati accepted and responded that he stood by the findings. He said "We admit in our paper that we can't disprove the impact hypothesis," and "Our point is that some of the spherules and other markers [cited in the 2007 report] aren't uniquely produced by impacts." West said the magnetic spherules were a key impact marker. In 2009, anthropologist Todd A. Surovell led an independent study to evaluate this marker at YD boundary sites and were unable replicate the spike in magnetic minerals reported by Firestone and collaborators. Instead, they found the samples had no unique level when compared non-YD boundary sites. Likewise, Pinter and collaborators later found that the magnetic spherules were instead consistent with iron-rich detrital grains of anthropogenic or otherwise terrestrial origin.

Skepticism increased in 2011 when Rex Dalton, who first reported on YDIH in 2007 in Nature, published his finding in the magazine Pacific Standard that consultant Allen West (born Alan Whitt), one of the lead authors of the 2007 paper and co-author of the 2006 book, had been convicted in California of fraud "for masquerading as a state-licensed geologist," discovered by Dalton under West's given name. Afterward, several co-authors of the paper distanced themselves from YDIH.

According to Mark Boslough, spherules, platinum-group elements, and nanodiamonds can have a variety of origins, both terrestrial and cosmic, and even if of cosmic origin, can result from the regular stream of collisions with Earth of relatively small meteors far smaller than required to cause Younger Dryas, and there is no clear evidence of these markers tightly clustering around the Younger Dryas boundary onset.

=== Comet Research Group ===
In 2016, West and some others formed Comet Research Group Inc. (CRG), a division of Rising Light Group, an Arizona non-profit that "promotes public awareness and tolerance in a variety of fields, including religion, philosophy and science." CRG states that its mission is to "find evidence about comet impacts and raise awareness about them before your city is next." Philanthropist and early Googler Eugene Jhong donated $1.25 million across two universities to fund CRG's work. The group publishes research about real geological phenomena with alternative explanations that diverge from scientific consensus. Since its forming, CRG has grown in collaborators and, since 2021, published several papers it claimed confirmed the validity of YDIH, arguing it was no longer a hypothesis, but instead a scientific theory, including a 2021 paper authored by theoretical physicist Martin Sweatman, who rejected all rebuttals of his work as "poorly constructed."

CRG members also claim that papers have been rejected by editors of scientific journals despite favorable peer reviews, leading them to publish their own journal Airbursts and Cratering Impacts, which they claim is held to the same peer-reviewed standards as their other journals. They said that publishing their own journal was necessary as their work is suppressed by "very influential scientists." Astrophysicist Malcolm LeCompte alleged one such scientist to be Holliday, who in 2023 was the lead author on a comprehensive refutation of YDIH, and a co-author, impact physicist Mark Boslough. Holliday, Boslough, and collaborators concluded that:

Evidence and arguments purported to support the YDIH involve flawed methodologies, inappropriate assumptions, questionable conclusions, misstatements of fact, misleading information, unsupported claims, irreproducible observations, logical fallacies, and selected omission of contrary information.

Also in 2023, Boslough was the author of an article in Skeptic magazine in which he cited more than 50 scientific publications to support his assertion that YDIH has never been accepted by any relevant experts. He wrote:

Plagued by self contradictions, logical fallacies, basic misunderstandings, misidentified impact evidence, abandoned claims, irreproducible results, questionable protocols, lack of disclosure, secretiveness, failed predictions, contaminated samples, pseudoscientific arguments, physically impossible mechanisms, and misrepresentations, the YDIH has never been accepted by experts in any related field.

==== Tell el-Hammam and data manipulation ====
In September 2021, CRG collaborators published a hypothesis about an ancient city destroyed by an air burst from a meteorite at the archaeological site Tell el-Hammam 3,600 years ago. The study, led by a biblical archaeologist, purported to be the site of the ruins of Sodom, a Biblical city destroyed in the Book of Genesis by God for wickedness. Image forensics expert Elisabeth Bik discovered evidence for digital alteration of images used as evidence for the claim that the village of Tall el-Hammam was engulfed by an air burst. CRG members initially denied tampering with the photos but eventually published a correction in which they admitted to inappropriate image manipulation. Five of the paper's 53 images received retouching to remove labels and arrows present in other published versions of the photos, which Bik believed to be a possible conflict with Scientific Reports' image submission guidelines but was not in itself a disproval of the Tall el-Hammam air burst hypothesis. On February 15, 2023, the following editor's note was posted on this paper: "Readers are alerted that concerns raised about the data presented and the conclusions of this article are being considered by the Editors. A further editorial response will follow the resolution of these issues." On April 24, 2025, Scientific Reports issued a Retraction Note, citing concerns about methodology, analysis, and data interpretation.

Another unrelated paper authored by a CRG member and leading YDIH advocate was retracted by Scientific Reports in 2023. The journal's Retraction Note cited a publication "indicating that the study does not provide data to support the claims of an airburst event or that such an event led to the decline of the Hopewell culture."

== Public interest ==
YDIH was popularized by its inclusion in documentaries, including media on the National Geographic Channel, History Channel, and the PBS program NOVA. In 2024, The New York Times (NYT) called YDIH "The Comet Strike Theory That Just Won't Die" in a feature describing the history and the public's peculiar fascination with it. The tendency for lay people to accept YDIH in the face of scientific consensus against it stems from "epistemic vigilance," a cognitive process that works to distinguish fact from fiction. Psychologists have found that when confronted by conflicting information from perceived experts, people tend to choose the side that most closely aligns with their existing beliefs or their political or cultural identity. Psychologist Spencer Mermelstein said that people likely choose YDIH because it offers a simple explanation that aligns with their knowledge of Earth's geologic past with "one big cause, one big outcome."

Author of pseudoscience Graham Hancock argued in his 2015 book Magicians of the Gods that the Younger Dryas comet destroyed the earth in a time cycle and that it was responsible for the Noahide flood myth. He inferred that this myth was widespread elsewhere on earth by comparing it with the flood mythology of other peoples. These claims were criticized as inaccurate by independent reviewers, including Jason Colavito, Michael Shermer, and Marc J. Defant. Hancock expanded on his claims in a subsequent book, America Before: The Key to Earth's Lost Civilization (2019), in which he claimed that the Younger Dryas catastrophe had wiped out all traces of a sophisticated Ice Age civilization in North America. The Society for American Archaeology (SAA) said in open letter that Hancock's ideas about such a civilization echoed and promoted "dangerous racist thinking."

The SAA's letter was an open call to Netflix to reclassify Hancock's 2022 docuseries as science fiction. The series, titled Ancient Apocalypse, primarily focused on Hancock's belief in such a lost civilization (including the fictional Atlantis). Episode 8 specifically covered YDIH. Impact physicist Mark Boslough published a commentary in the magazine Skeptic with the conclusion that many attributes of the series are pseudoscience. Articles in The Guardian, Slate, The Nation, and other left-leaning publications rebutted and ridiculed the Netflix series, while conservative outlets gave it glowing reviews and referred to criticism as left-wing propaganda. Political activist Tucker Carlson wrote that the SAA was an "elitist, closed-minded cabal" linked to the "collapse of the American idea."

The YouTube community has further increased visibility of YDIH into popular discussion with many dozens of videos discussing the topic. Within the community, similar identity divisions appear around the rejection or acceptance of YDIH to the mainstream media. YouTubers who subscribe to YDIH cast its skeptics as villains part of a "scientific cabal" or victims of groupthink. YDIH continues to gain momentum in spite of scientific consensus to the contrary due to its grip on the public imagination and its relation to personal and group identity, rather than scientific inquiry. In particular, YDIH appeals to people who are susceptible to conspiracy theories that reject scientific expertise.
