= Fingerprints of the Gods =

1995 book by Graham Hancock

- Cover of the first American edition
- Author: Graham Hancock
- Language: English
- Subject: Pseudoarchaeology
- Publisher: Crown Publishing Group
- Publication date: 1995
- Media type: Print
- ISBN: 978-0-517-88729-5

Fingerprints of the Gods: The Evidence of Earth's Lost Civilization is a 1995 pseudoarchaeology book by British writer Graham Hancock. Hancock claims that an advanced civilization lived on Antarctica during the last ice age before the continent shifted south to its current position. He argues that survivors carried their knowledge to cultures around the world, which he says produced the earliest known civilizations. The book promotes a form of hyperdiffusionism that draws heavily on the work of Ignatius L. Donnelly and Charles Hapgood. Hancock later extended the narrative in Magicians of the Gods.

== Thesis ==
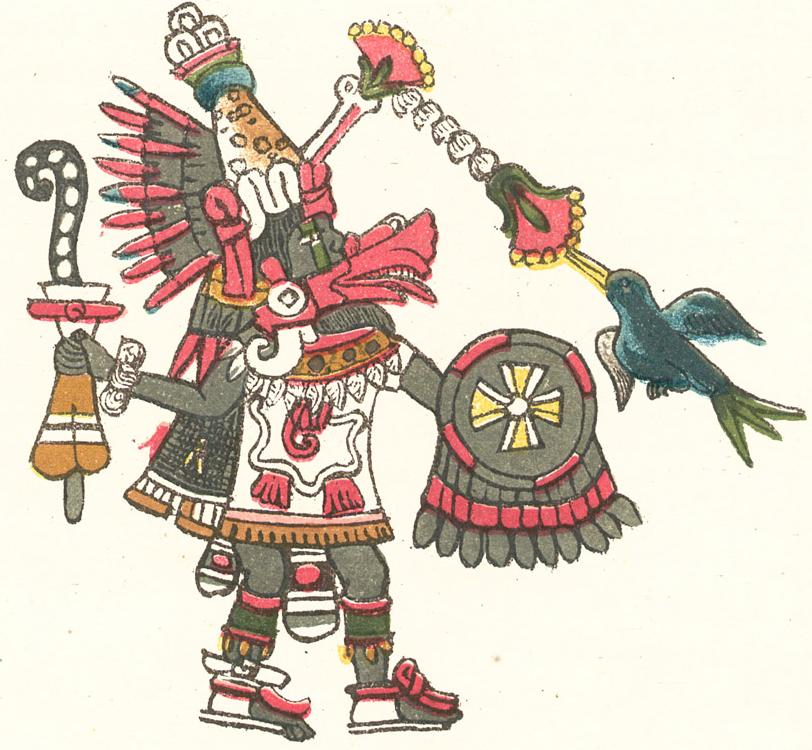
The Mesoamerican deity Quetzalcoatl as depicted in the Codex Magliabechiano

Hancock argues that a civilization based on Antarctica, which he says once lay farther from the South Pole, left "fingerprints" in Ancient Egypt and in American cultures such as the Olmec, Aztec and Maya. He cites creation myths that describe deities including Osiris and Thoth in Egypt, Quetzalcoatl in Mesoamerica and Viracocha in the Andes. He also references archaeological sites such as Tiwanaku in Bolivia. UNESCO dates Tiwanaku's peak between 400 and 900 AD, yet Hancock assigns the city to a far earlier era. Tiwanaku appears in other works of "alternative archaeology" including Von Däniken's Chariots of the Gods?. Von Däniken presents the complex as evidence for extraterrestrials, whereas Hancock rejects "ancient astronauts" explanations and instead locates the source civilization in Atlantis.

Hancock dates a major pole shift to 10,450 BC. He states that Antarctica lay farther from the South Pole before this event and moved to its current position afterward. The pole-shift claim relies on Charles Hapgood's theory of Earth crustal displacement. Hapgood linked the idea to Atlantis and suggested that crustal displacement destroyed the mythical land. The geological community rejects his model in favour of plate tectonics, yet Rand and Rose Flem-Ath adopted it in When the Sky Fell: in Search of Atlantis (1995/2009), expanding on Hapgood's argument and placing Atlantis in Antarctica.

== Reception ==
Scholars and scientists describe the book's proposals as pseudoscience and pseudoarchaeology.

Canadian author Heather Pringle places Fingerprints within a pseudoscientific lineage that stretches from the writings of H. S. Bellamy and Denis Saurat to Heinrich Himmler's racial research institute, the Ahnenerbe, and the theories of Nazi archaeologist Edmund Kiss. She highlights the book's "wild speculations" about the origins of Tiwanaku and calls Hancock a "fabulist".

Kenneth Feder likens the book to a "Victorian travelogue" written by an author without archaeological training. He notes that Hancock credits a mysterious white people for the accomplishments of the ancient civilizations he visits and that Hancock describes the Maya as "jungle-dwelling Indians" incapable of devising a sophisticated calendar. Feder considers Hancock's synthesis of fringe writers such as Ignatius Donnelly, Charles Hapgood, Arthur Posnansky, Robert Bauval and Anthony West "very hard to swallow, indeed."

Fingerprints of the Gods has been translated into 27 languages and is estimated to have sold five million copies worldwide.

Hancock responded to his critics with a 2001 edition titled Fingerprints of the Gods: The Quest Continues, which added a new introduction and appendices. Mikey Brass, reviewing in Skeptical Inquirer, remarked that Hancock "didn't change a word" of the original text and continued to defend the disputed claims. The updated edition left unanswered the scientific evidence that challenged his statements about "Earth Crustal Displacement" and the "frozen mammoths".

== Influence ==
Fingerprints of the Gods inspired the 2009 disaster film 2012. In a November 2009 interview with the London magazine Time Out, director Roland Emmerich said, "I always wanted to do a biblical flood movie, but I never felt I had the hook. I first read about the Earth's crust displacement theory in Graham Hancock's Fingerprints of the Gods."

Emmerich and co-writer Harald Kloser also credit the book in the extras for the Blu-ray 10,000 BC.
