= Proceedings of the National Academy of Sciences of the United States of America =

Academic journal of the National Academy of Sciences

Proceedings of the National Academy of Sciences
- Discipline: Multidisciplinary
- Language: English
- Edited by: May Berenbaum

Publication details
- History: 1915–present
- Publisher: United States National Academy of Sciences (United States)
- Frequency: Weekly
- Open access: Hybrid, delayed (after 6 months)
- Impact factor: 9.1 (2024)

Standard abbreviations
- ISO 4: Proc. Natl. Acad. Sci. U.S.A.

Indexing
- CODEN: PNASA6
- ISSN: 0027-8424 (print); 1091-6490 (web)
- LCCN: 16010069
- JSTOR: 00278424
- OCLC no.: 43473694

Links
- Journal homepage; Online access; Online archive

Proceedings of the National Academy of Sciences of the United States of America (often abbreviated PNAS or PNAS USA) is a peer-reviewed multidisciplinary scientific journal. It is the official journal of the National Academy of Sciences, published since 1915, and publishes original research, scientific reviews, commentaries, and letters. According to Journal Citation Reports, the journal has a 2024 impact factor of 8.9. PNAS is the second most cited scientific journal, with more than 1.9 million cumulative citations from 2008 to 2018. In the past, PNAS has been described by US local newspapers as "prestigious", "renowned" and "high impact".

PNAS is a delayed open-access journal, with an embargo period of six months that can be bypassed for an author fee (hybrid open access). Since September 2017, open access articles are published under a Creative Commons license. Since January 2019, PNAS has been online-only, although print issues are available on demand.

== History ==
PNAS was established by the National Academy of Sciences (NAS) in 1914, (Note: The Stankus book reference states 1918 as the year instead of 1914.) with its first issue published in 1915. The NAS itself was founded in 1863 as a private institution, but chartered by the United States Congress, with the goal to "investigate, examine, experiment and report upon any subject of science or art".

Prior to the inception of PNAS, the National Academy of Sciences published three volumes of organizational transactions, consisting mostly of minutes of meetings and annual reports. For much of the journal's history, PNAS published brief first announcements of Academy members' and associates' contributions to research. In December 1995, PNAS opened submissions to all authors without first needing to be sponsored by an NAS member.

Members were allowed to communicate up to two papers from non-members to PNAS every year. The review process for these papers was anonymous in that the identities of the referees were not revealed to the authors. Referees were selected by the NAS member. PNAS eliminated communicated submissions through NAS members as of July 1, 2010, while continuing to make the final decision on all PNAS papers.

95% of papers are peer reviewed Direct Submissions and 5% are contributed submissions.

In 2022 NAS established PNAS Nexus, an interdisciplinary open-access journal published by Oxford Academic.

=== American national security concerns ===
In 2003, PNAS issued an editorial stating its policy on publication of sensitive material in the life sciences. PNAS stated that it would "continue to monitor submitted papers for material that may be deemed inappropriate and that could, if published, compromise the public welfare". This statement was in keeping with the efforts of several other journals. In 2005 PNAS published an article titled "Analyzing a bioterror attack on the food supply: The case of botulinum toxin in milk", despite objections raised by the U.S. Department of Health and Human Services. The paper was published with a commentary by the president of the Academy at the time, Bruce Alberts, titled "Modeling attacks on the food supply".

=== Contributed review concerns ===
The controversial Younger Dryas impact hypothesis, which evolved directly from pseudoscience and now forms the basis for the pseudoarchaeology of Graham Hancock's Ancient Apocalypse, was first published in PNAS using a nonstandard review system, according to a comprehensive refutation by Holliday et al (2023). According to this 2023 review, "Claiming evidence where none exists and providing misleading citations may be accidental, but when conducted repeatedly, it becomes negligent and undermines scientific advancement as well as the credibility of science itself. Also culpable is the failure of the peer review process to prevent such errors of fact from entering the literature. The Proceedings of the National Academy of Sciences 'contributed review' system for National Academy members...is at least partially responsible. The 'pal reviews' (as some refer to them) were significantly curtailed in 2010, in part due to the YDIH controversy."

== Editors ==
The following people have been editors-in-chief of the journal:

- 1914–1918: Arthur A. Noyes
- 1918–1940: Raymond Pearl
- 1940–1949: Robert A. Millikan
- 1950–1955: Linus Pauling
- 1955–1960: Wendell M. Stanley
- 1960–1968: Saunders Mac Lane
- 1968–1972: John T. Edsall
- 1972–1980: Robert L. Sinsheimer
- 1980–1984: Daniel E. Koshland, Jr.
- 1985–1988: Maxine Singer
- 1988–1991: Igor B. Dawid
- 1991–1995: Lawrence Bogorad
- 1995–2006: Nicholas R. Cozzarelli
- 2006–2011: Randy Schekman
- 2011–2017: Inder Verma
- 2018–2019: Natasha Raikhel
- 2019–present: May Berenbaum

The first managing editor of the journal was mathematician Edwin Bidwell Wilson.
