= Flint Dibble =

American archaeologist and science communicator

- Occupation: Archaeologist
- Parent: Harold L. Dibble (father)

Academic background
- Education: University of Pennsylvania (BA); University of Cincinnati (MA, PhD)
- Thesis: Politika Zoa: Animals and Social Change in Ancient Greece (2017)
- Doctoral advisor: Kathleen Lynch

Academic work
- Institutions: Cardiff University

Flint Dibble is an American archaeologist and science communicator, whose research focuses on foodways in ancient Greece, and whose science communication promotes the field of archaeology and debunks pseudoarchaeology. He teaches at Cardiff University, where he is the Marie Skłodowska-Curie Research Fellow leading the ZOOCRETE project. He is the son of archaeologist Harold L. Dibble.

He debated author and promoter of pseudoarchaeology Graham Hancock on The Joe Rogan Experience, and he produces an archaeology focused YouTube channel.

== Education ==
Dibble received his B.A. from the University of Pennsylvania. His 2004 thesis, "Magic, Drugs, and Magic Drugs: A Survey of Wormwood in the Greek Magical Papyri", was supervised by Peter Struck. In 2010, he received an M.A. in Classical Archaeology from University of Cincinnati. He did postgraduate work at University of Sheffield, Department of Archaeology under Paul Halstead. He received his PhD in 2017 from University of Cincinnati, where his dissertation, "Politika Zoa: Animals and Social Change in Ancient Greece", was supervised by Kathleen Lynch.

Dibble was a senior associate member of the American School of Classical Studies at Athens.

His research touches on topics of urbanism, climate change, religious ritual, and everyday life. His current project, ZOOCRETE: The Zooarchaeology of Historical Crete: A Multiscalar Approach to Animals in Ancient Greece, combines archaeological, textual, and biomolecular evidence for the human management and consumption of animals.

In 2015, Dibble as a graduate student was part of a University of Cincinnati team that discovered a remarkable Mycenaean grave in Greece. The Smithsonian Magazine reported that it yielded "bronze basins, weapons and armor, ... gold and silver cups; hundreds of beads made of carnelian, amethyst, amber and gold; more than 50 stone seals intricately carved with goddesses, lions and bulls; and four stunning gold rings", and noted that "This was ... among the most spectacular archaeological discoveries in Greece in more than half a century".

== Debating Graham Hancock ==
In 2024, Dibble appeared on the Joe Rogan Experience podcast opposite Graham Hancock, who is a popular promotor of the pseudoarchaeological hypothesis that there once existed an advanced Ice Age civilization that was destroyed in a global cataclysm, as popularized on Ancient Apocalypse, a 2022 documentary series produced by Netflix. Dibble had criticized Hancock on X/Twitter and was brought onto the podcast to debate Hancock. The episode lasted for four and a half hours.

Archaeology Review published a review of the debate, finding that Hancock's assumptions were "remarkably short-sighted and ignorant", and that Dibble made a thorough job of reviewing the state of the evidence.

Plans for an earlier debate in January 2023 had to be cancelled when Dibble was told his cancer had returned.

== Selected publications ==
- Dibble, Flint; Finné, Martin (2021-09-30). "Socioenvironmental change as a process: Changing foodways as adaptation to climate change in South Greece from the Late Bronze Age to the Early Iron Age". Quaternary International. Human Adaptations in Mediterranean Environments. 597: 50–62. Bibcode:2021QuInt.597...50D. doi:10.1016/j.quaint.2021.04.024. ISSN 1040-6182. Archived from the original on 2023-01-13.
- Dibble, Flint (2021-04-01). "Bones around town: Taphonomic patterns from civic feasting and residential dining contexts at Late Archaic Azoria, Crete". Journal of Archaeological Science: Reports. 36 102771. Bibcode:2021JArSR..36j2771D. doi:10.1016/j.jasrep.2020.102771. ISSN 2352-409X.
- Dibble, Flint; Fallu, Daniel J. (2020-04-01). "New data from old bones: A taphonomic reassessment of Early Iron Age beef ranching at Nichoria, Greece". Journal of Archaeological Science: Reports. 30 102234. Bibcode:2020JArSR..30j2234D. doi:10.1016/j.jasrep.2020.102234. ISSN 2352-409X. Archived from the original on 2022-05-10.
- Dibble, W. Flint (2018-05-31), Tsipopoulou, Metaxia (ed.), Animal bones, INSTAP Academic Press, pp. 87–92, ISBN 978-1-931534-95-6, archived from the original on 2024-10-07
- Weiberg, Erika; Unkel, Ingmar; Kouli, Katerina; Holmgren, Karin; Avramidis, Pavlos; Bonnier, Anton; Dibble, Flint; Finné, Martin; Izdebski, Adam; Katrantsiotis, Christos; Stocker, Sharon R.; Andwinge, Maria; Baika, Kalliopi; Boyd, Meighan; Heymann, Christian (2016-03-15). "The socio-environmental history of the Peloponnese during the Holocene: Towards an integrated understanding of the past". Quaternary Science Reviews. Special Issue: Mediterranean Holocene Climate, Environment and Human Societies. 136: 40–65. Bibcode:2016QSRv..136...40W. doi:10.1016/j.quascirev.2015.10.042. ISSN 0277-3791.
- Dibble, W. Flint (2015-12-18). "Data Collection in Zooarchaeology: Incorporating Touch-Screen, Speech-Recognition, Barcodes, and GIS". Ethnobiology Letters. 6 (2): 249–257. doi:10.14237/ebl.6.2.2015.393. ISSN 2159-8126. Archived from the original on 2024-10-08.
- Sullivan, Alan P.; Dibble, William Flint (2014), "Site Formation Processes", in Smith, Claire (ed.), Encyclopedia of Global Archaeology, New York, NY: Springer, pp. 6687–6701, doi:10.1007/978-1-4419-0465-2_211, ISBN 978-1-4419-0465-2
