= The Sign and the Seal =

1992 book by Graham Hancock

- Cover of the first edition
- Author: Graham Hancock
- Language: English
- Subject: Ark of the Covenant
- Published: 1992
- Publisher: Heinemann (UK), Crown (US)
- Media type: Print (Hardcover and Paperback)
- Pages: 600
- ISBN: 978-0-434-31333-4
- OCLC: 65797265

The Sign and the Seal: The Quest for the Lost Ark of the Covenant is a pseudoarchaeological 1992 book by British author Graham Hancock, in which the author describes his search for the Ark of the Covenant and proposes a theory of the ark's historical movements and current whereabouts. The book sold well but received negative reviews.

== Summary ==
Hancock proposes that the ark was removed from Solomon's Temple in Jerusalem by temple priests during the reign of the evil King Manasseh of Judah around 650 BC, and then it spent about 200 years in a purpose-built temple in Elephantine, Egypt. It was removed around 470 BC to Ethiopia via tributaries to the Nile River, where it was kept on the Jewish island of Tana Qirqos for about eight hundred more years as the centre of a strong Jewish community there. It finally came into the hands of the young Ethiopian Orthodox Church in the 5th century, who took it to their capital of Axum, where it supposedly remains there to this day in the Church of Our Lady Mary of Zion. The Ethiopian Church believes that the Ark is indeed held today in that church, but as opposed to the book, they believe that it was brought to Ethiopia by Menelik I, stolen from Solomon's Temple during the reign of King Solomon himself, some 200 years earlier than the events proposed by the book.

Hancock also claims that the Holy Grail and the Ark of the Covenant may possibly be one and the same relic as a result of a comparative study of the great German epic Wolfram von Eschenbach's Parzival, the Ethiopian national epic Kebra Nagast, the legends of Prester John, and the iconography of Chartres Cathedral.

Hancock also claims that the Knights Templar searched for the lost Ark of the Covenant, among other relics, at the site of the Temple Mount in Jerusalem in the 12th century. It is likely that an Ethiopian king in exile (Lalibela) in Jerusalem in the 12th century made contact with the Knights Templar. This claim is supported by the legacy of architecture in the city of Lalibela built during the reign of King Lalibela, of which the Church of Saint George, Lalibela is of particular interest, in relation to the development of Gothic architecture.

The Ethiopian Church, apparently fearful of losing the Ark to the Knights Templar, sent emissaries in 1306 to Pope Clement V; the Catholic Church's fear of the Knights Templar acquiring the power of the Ark of the Covenant, the book claims, is one of the reasons why Pope Clement V began prosecution and arrest of the Knights Templar in 1307.

== Reception ==
The book sold well, but received negative reviews from critics. Jonathan Kirsch of the Los Angeles Times wrote, "It's part travelogue, part true-adventure, part mystery-thriller. But mostly it's a whacking big dose of amateur scholarship alloyed with a fervid imagination and the kind of narrative that comes in handy when telling ghost stories around a campfire." Desmond Ryan of the Philadelphia Inquirer joked, "If [Hancock] did any more speculating than what is strewn through the many pages of The Sign and the Seal, he would have to go into real estate." Richard Furlong described the book as "a thoroughly engaging read, written in an easy-to-follow, breathless style by someone who is absorbed by his task. Highly recommended for conspiracy fans."

== Bibliography ==
- Hancock, Graham (1992). The Sign and the Seal: The Quest for the Lost Ark of the Covenant. New York: Crown. ISBN 0-517-57813-1.
