= Magicians of the Gods =

Book by Graham Hancock

- First edition (UK)
- Author: Graham Hancock
- Language: English
- Subject: Prehistory, Atlantis pseudohistory
- Published: UK: 10 September 2015 (Coronet/Hodder & Stoughton); US: 10 November 2015 (Thomas Dunne Books/St. Martin's Press)
- Publication date: 2015
- Publication place: United Kingdom
- ISBN: 978-1-250-11840-0

Magicians of the Gods: The Forgotten Wisdom of Earth's Lost Civilisation is a 2015 book by British pseudoarchaeology writer Graham Hancock, published by Thomas Dunne Books in the United States and by Coronet in the United Kingdom. Macmillan Publishers released an "updated and expanded" paperback edition in 2017.

A sequel to Hancock's Fingerprints of the Gods (1995), the book builds on the premise that a highly advanced "lost civilisation" operated in prehistory but was destroyed in a global catastrophe. Hancock seeks an explanation for his catastrophe in the controversial Younger Dryas impact hypothesis, suggesting that around 10,800 BC the fragments of a large comet struck the earth, causing widespread destruction, climate change, and sea-level rise. He then recounts that the survivors of this catastrophe, the titular "Magicians", dispersed across the world to pass on the knowledge of their lost civilisation. He links this to the construction of various ancient monuments, including Göbekli Tepe, Baalbek, the Great Sphinx and the Pyramids of Giza, some of which Hancock claims to be much older than mainstream archaeologists determined.

Literary reviewers found the book ludicrous but entertaining, whilst sceptic and mainstream academic reviewers criticised Hancock for a litany of factual errors, for selective use of evidence and for logical fallacies. However, some tempered their skepticism as further evidence came out in support of the impact hypothesis. The book appeared on the New York Times Best Seller list in the category "Religion, Spirituality and Faith" in December 2015.

== Synopsis ==
Hancock's thesis is based on the discredited, controversial, and refuted Younger Dryas impact hypothesis, which proposes that the Younger Dryas climate event was caused by one or more large comets striking the Earth around 10,800 BC. Hancock argues that this caused widespread destruction, with a short-term return to Ice Age conditions followed by massive flooding that altered the continental landscape. Specifically, he claims that coastal civilisations in and around the Atlantic Ocean, Southeast Asia and the Pacific Ocean were destroyed by rising sea levels. He argues that this was the origin of various flood myths around the world, and that "what we think of as human history is merely the record of human events that have transpired since the last, great planetary catastrophe."

To support his theory, Hancock discusses archaeological sites such as Göbekli Tepe in Turkey, the Roman Heliopolis in Lebanon, and the Egyptian pyramids. He claims that parts of these sites were built more than 10,000 years ago, in some cases much earlier than accepted by orthodox history, and with techniques and technology that were not yet supposed to be in existence. He therefore supposes that they were constructed by theorized civilisations destroyed by the Younger Dryas impact event, or else the survivors of the event and their immediate descendants. In the later case, he proposes that their purpose was to pass on the knowledge of these pre-cataclysm civilisations, with their builders being the book's titular "magicians of the gods".

== Reception ==
Literary reviewers have described the book as ludicrous but entertaining. Michael Taube of The Washington Times wrote, "obviously, I don't believe in Mr. Hancock's creative fairytale [...] but if a little magic is your cup of tea, this phantasmagorical book will do the trick." Kirkus Reviews concluded that it is "risible and sure to sell." Conversely, sceptic author Jason Colavito considered it "not a good book by either the standards of entertainment or science", describing it as derivative of previous works of catastrophist pseudoarchaeology, and saying that it showed "Hancock at his worst: angry, petulant, and slipshod."
