= Rand Flem-Ath =

Canadian librarian and author

- Born: Rand Fleming; 1949/50
- Occupations: Writer, librarian
- Writing career
- Period: 20th-21st century
- Subject: Atlantis

Rand Flem-Ath (born c. 1949 as Rand Fleming) is a Canadian librarian and author known for his numerous books about the lost continent of Atlantis and the theory of Earth Crustal Displacement.

== Biography ==
Rand Flem-Ath was born Rand Fleming, but when he married Rose De'ath they adopted the joint surname Flem-Ath.

His views are influenced by Charles Hapgood and in turn influenced Graham Hancock's Fingerprints of the Gods.

== Books ==
- Flem-Ath, Rand; Flem-Ath, Rose (2012). Atlantis beneath the ice: The fate of the Lost Continent. Rochester, VT: Bear & Company. ISBN 9781591438953. (originally published in 1995 as When the Sky Fell: In Search of Atlantis)
- Flem-Ath, Rand; Wilson, Colin (2008). The Atlantis Blueprint: Unlocking the Ancient Mysteries of a Long-Lost Civilization. Random House LLC. ISBN 9780307481757.
- Flem-Ath, Rand; Flem-Ath, Rose (1995). When the Sky Fell: In Search of Atlantis. Orion. ISBN 0752801716.
- Flem-Ath, Rand; Flem-Ath, Rose (2014). Killing Moses: Solving History's Oldest Cold Case Mystery. oncetherewasawayPress. ISBN 978-0984114696.
