= Legends of the Lost with Megan Fox =

American docu-series starring Megan Fox

- Genre: Documentary
- Created by: Megan Fox
- Directed by: Jeffrey Daniels
- Starring: Megan Fox
- Country of origin: United States
- Original language: English
- No. of seasons: 1
- No. of episodes: 4

Production
- Executive producers: Megan Fox; Emre Sahin; Sarah Wetherbee; Kelly McPherson; Tracy Bacal; Jason Wolf; Todd Cohen; Pete Ritchie
- Producers: Jared Cook; Lisa Lumar
- Running time: 60 minutes
- Production companies: Karga Seven Pictures (Red Arrow Studios)

Original release
- Network: Travel Channel
- Release: December 4 – December 25, 2018

Legends of the Lost with Megan Fox is an American docuseries starring and co-created by Megan Fox that premiered on December 4, 2018, on the Travel Channel.

== Synopsis ==
In the docu-series, we learn that "Fox has been obsessed since an early age with the history of ancient cultures, people and places — always questioning their documented story." We follow her "embarking on an epic and personal journey across the globe" where Fox, archaeologists and experts will "re-examine history, asking tough questions and challenging the conventional wisdom that has existed for centuries". Among other themes, the series will consider whether female Amazon warriors really existed and whether the Trojan War was a historical event.

== Production ==
The series was originally titled Mysteries and Myths with Megan Fox. In July 2018, shooting for the documentary was being done in Istanbul, Turkey.

== Episodes ==
No.	Title	Original release date	U.S. viewers (millions)
1	"Viking Women Warriors"	December 4, 2018	N/A
2	"Stonehenge: The Healing Stones"	December 11, 2018	N/A
3	"America's Lost Civilization"	December 18, 2018	N/A
4	"The Trojan War: Myth or Truth?"	December 25, 2018	N/A

== Academic criticism ==
The program attracted media criticism for its mix of historical fact and pseudoarchaeology: writing in The Washington Post, David S. Anderson highlighted Fox's self-professed interest in ancient astronauts theories and the show's "complicated relationship with academic authorities" and accused her of using academics "as steppingstones to offer unsubstantiated claims about the ancient world." He concluded promoting "alternative facts" comes with a cost. "Legends of the Lost" may have entertained and may even have sparked curiosity in the ancient world, but it has also profoundly blurred the lines between truth and fiction."

== See also ==
- Ancient Apocalypse, a 2022 documentary series
