= Hiawatha impact structure =

Impact crater in northwest Greenland

Hiawatha Crater
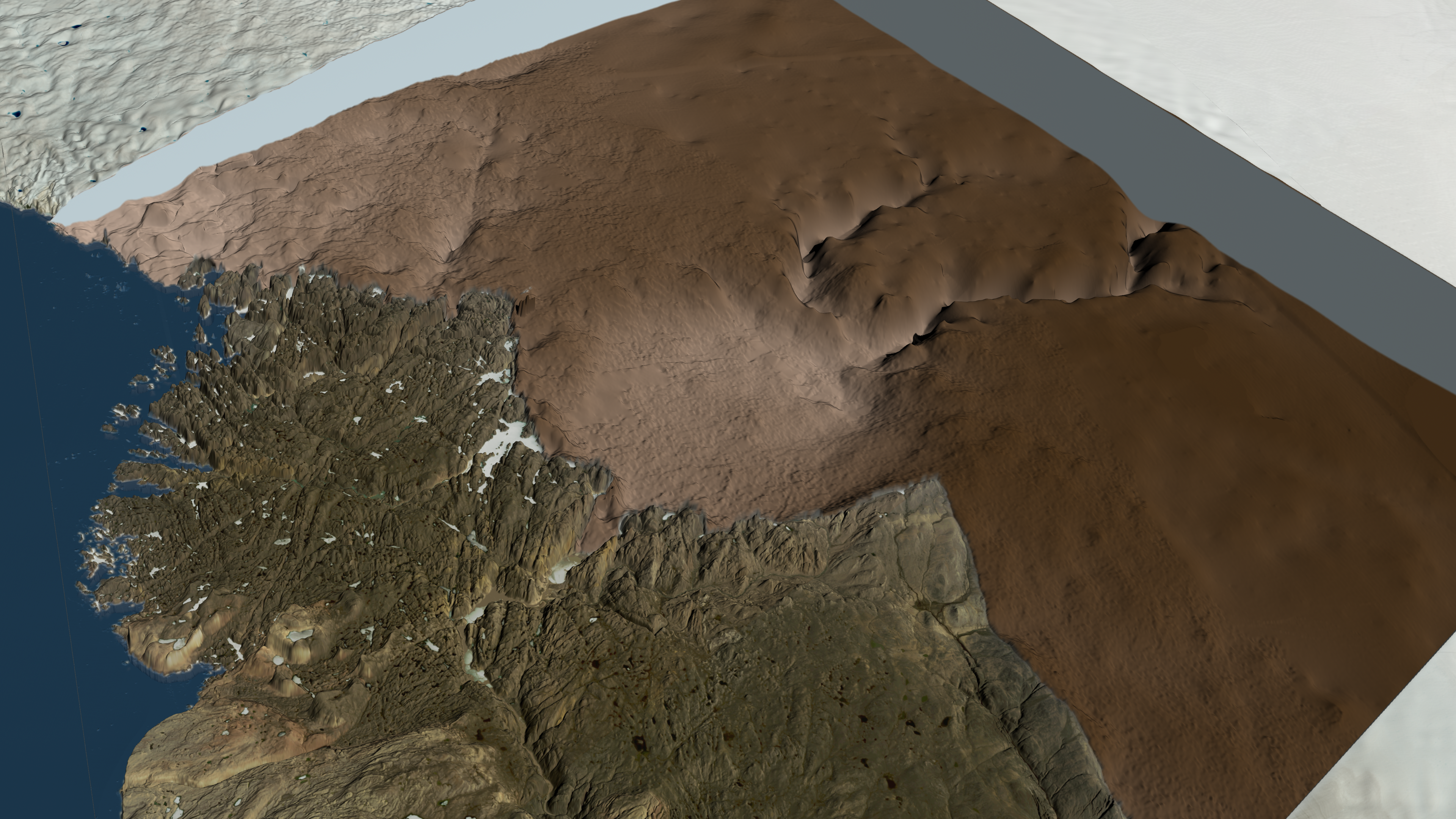
- NASA digital elevation model with the ice sheet removed to show surface of bedrock in the region around the Hiawatha Glacier

- Location within Greenland
- Location: Avannaata, Greenland; 78°44′N 66°14′W

Impact crater structure
- Confidence: Probable
- Diameter: 31 km (19 mi)
- Depth: 320 m (1,050 ft)
- Impactor diameter: 1.5 km (0.93 mi)
- Age: 57.99 ± 0.54 Ma, Late Paleocene
- Exposed: no
- Drilled: no
- Bolide type: Iron meteorite
- Access: none

The Hiawatha impact structure is a probable impact structure discovered beneath the Hiawatha Glacier bordering eastern Inglefield Land, in northwest Greenland, from which it gets its name. It was identified using airborne radar surveys that showed the presence of a crater-like depression in the bedrock beneath the ice. Shocked quartz grains and melt rock clasts have been found in fluvio-glacial sediments deposited by a river that drains the area of the structure. The timing of the impact has been dated using argon–argon dating and uranium–lead dating of zircon crystals within the melt rock to 57.99 ± 0.54 million years ago, during the late Paleocene.

== Discovery ==
In 2016 airborne radar surveys were acquired by the Alfred Wegener Institute to investigate the morphology of the bedrock surface beneath the ice. The results of this dataset were combined with existing data acquired by NASA as part of their Program for Arctic Regional Climate Assessment and Operation IceBridge. A circular depression was evident in the bedrock surface, which coincides closely with a circular feature on the ice surface. Fieldwork was also carried out at the margin of the ice sheet in the summer of 2016 and evidence of an impact structure was found in sediment samples taken from the river draining the crater.

== Morphology ==
The circular depression is about 31 km (19 mi) across and has a well-defined rim. The rim-to-floor depth is about 320 m (1,050 ft) and a broad central uplift has been identified with a prominence of 50 m (160 ft). Two sub-glacial channels cut through the southeastern rim becoming poorly defined within the depression, before a single channel cuts the northwestern rim, carrying the outflow river.

== Evidence of origin ==
Apart from the clearly defined circular depression, the identification of the feature as an impact structure is based on field samples taken from fluvio-glacial sediments from the outwash deposits of the river that drains the crater. Initial samples from the 2016 fieldwork contained shocked quartz grains with multiple planar deformation features (PDFs). The observed orientation of the PDFs is consistent with a high-pressure origin. Further analysis of samples taken in 2019 identified clasts of melt rock, containing shocked zircon grains.

== Dating ==
Argon–argon dating was used on quartz grains found in samples of fluvio-glacial sand. Grains were identified as probable melted quartz based on shape and colour. The resulting Ar–Ar age spectra gave saddle-shaped patterns for 29 out of the 50 grains. No well-developed plateau were seen in any of the samples but two gave "mini-plateaus" indicating Late Paleocene ages, consistent with the saddles from the other samples.

Uranium-Lead dating was used on both undeformed and shocked zircon grains found within the identified melt rock clasts sampled during field work in 2019. Undeformed zircons gave ages generally consistent with the age of the regional basement geology, which is mainly Paleoproterozoic. The shocked zircons show clear evidence of being affected by a younger event, with an overall discordant age distribution, interpreted as partial resetting with a well-developed concordant plateau at the younger ages, indicating an age of about 58 million years ago for the impact.

Initial speculations of the crater having a much younger age, during the Pleistocene, led to failed predictions of an association with the controversial Younger Dryas impact hypothesis. The Late Paleocene age is not directly associated with any clear climatic effects.

== Impactor ==
The nature of the impactor responsible for the observed impact structure has been derived from field samples, which suggest that the asteroid responsible was a strongly fractionated iron type. For the size of crater observed, an impactor of about 1.5 km (0.93 mi) across is indicated.
