= Ancient Apocalypse =

Pseudoarcheological Netflix series

- Promotional poster
- Presented by: Graham Hancock
- Country of origin: United Kingdom
- Original language: English (Note: With some dialogue in Turkish in the first season, as well as Spanish in the second season.)
- No. of seasons: 2
- No. of episodes: 14

Production
- Executive producer: Bruce Kennedy
- Producer: Clementine Mortelman
- Running time: 29–34 minutes (first season); 40 minutes (second season)
- Production company: ITN Productions

Original release
- Network: Netflix
- Release: 10 November 2022 – present

Ancient Apocalypse is a television series, classified by its publisher Netflix as a documentary, where the British writer Graham Hancock presents his pseudoarchaeological theory that there was an advanced civilization during the last ice age and that it was destroyed as a result of meteor impacts around 12,000 years ago. He argues that the survivors passed on their knowledge to hunter-gatherers around the world, giving rise to all earliest known civilizations. The episodes feature Hancock visiting archaeological sites and natural features which he claims show evidence of this. He repeatedly alleges that archaeologists are ignoring or covering up the evidence.

The series presents pseudoscientific claims that lack evidence, cherry picks, and fails to present the counter-evidence. Archaeologists and other experts also criticised the program for delegitimising the achievements of Indigenous peoples. Some non-academic reviewers also found the theories unconvincing and criticized Hancock's complaints about 'mainstream archaeology' as one-sided and evocative of conspiracy theories. Some experts featured in the first series complained that footage of them was presented in a misleading way.

The first season of the series, produced by ITN Productions, was released on Netflix in November 2022. A second season, featuring actor Keanu Reeves alongside Hancock, is focused on the Americas and was released in October 2024.

== Synopsis ==
In the series, Hancock argues that there was an advanced civilization during the last ice age. He speculates that it was destroyed around 12,000 years ago by sudden climate change during the Younger Dryas cool period, but that its few survivors taught agriculture, monumental architecture and astronomy to primitive hunter-gatherers around the world. Hancock does not accept that the earliest known civilizations could have arisen independently or that faraway peoples developed the same ideas, and argues that they all came from one advanced ice age civilization. He attempts to show how several ancient monuments and myths are evidence of this, and claims that archaeologists are ignoring or covering up this alleged evidence. It incorporates the controversial Younger Dryas impact hypothesis, which has been comprehensively refuted, and which attributes climate change to an impact winter caused by a massive meteor bombardment.

== Production and release ==
The series was produced by ITN Productions and released by Netflix on 10 November 2022. Hancock's son Sean is a manager at Netflix responsible for "unscripted originals". It was the second most-watched series on Netflix in its week of release.

Two archaeologists who were featured in the first season, Katya Stroud, a senior curator at Heritage Malta, and Necmi Karul, the director of excavations at Göbekli Tepe, said that their interviews were manipulated and presented out of context.

A second season was released on Netflix on 16 October 2024 and featured the actor Keanu Reeves alongside Hancock. Plans to film parts of the second season of the show in the USA were cancelled following opposition from Indigenous groups over Hancock's depiction of their history and culture.

== Episodes ==
=== Season one ===
Episodes
Episode number	Title	Subjects
1	Once There Was a Flood	Gunung Padang, Sundaland, Nan Madol
2	Survivor in a Time of Chaos	Cholula (Mesoamerican site), Great Pyramid of Cholula, Texcotzingo, Xochicalco
3	Sirius Rising	Megalithic Temples of Malta, Malta Cart Ruts, Għar Dalam, Sirius
4	Ghosts of a Drowned World	Bimini Road, Piri Reis map of 1513, Shark Island (Bimini)
5	Legacy of the Sages	Göbekli Tepe, Karahan Tepe
6	America's Lost Civilization	Poverty Point, Serpent Mound, Mound Builders, Clovis culture
7	Fatal Winter	Derinkuyu, Kaymakli Underground City, Nevşehir
8	Cataclysm and Rebirth	Channeled Scablands, Missoula Floods, Murray Springs Clovis Site, Younger Dryas, Younger Dryas impact hypothesis

=== Season two: The Americas ===
Episode number	Title	Subjects
1	Chapter I	White Sands fossil footprints, Amazonian geoglyphs
2	Chapter II	Serra do Paituna, Easter Island, Moai
3	Chapter III	Easter Island, Paracas Candelabra, Viracocha
4	Chapter IV	Sacsayhuamán, Viracocha, terra preta, Temple of the Moon
5	Chapter V	Native American mounds, Pueblo Bonito, Chaco Canyon, Palenque
6	Chapter VI	Palenque, Kukulkan, El Castillo, Chichen Itza, Quetzalcoatl, Oannes, Osiris, Maya calendar

== Reception ==
Archaeologists and other experts heavily critique the show for the theories presented in it, which are pseudoscientific and lack evidence, and for the show's many easily disproven claims. The Society for American Archaeology objected to the classification of the series as a documentary and requested that Netflix reclassify it as science fiction, stating:

"the series devalues the archaeological profession on the basis of false claims and disinformation;... repeatedly and vigorously dismisses archaeologists and the practice of archaeology with aggressive rhetoric, willfully seeking to cause harm to our membership and our profession in the public eye; ... the theory it presents has a long-standing association with racist, white supremacist ideologies; does injustice to Indigenous peoples; and emboldens extremists."

Archaeologist Flint Dibble said the show is "lacking in evidence to support Hancock's theory", while there is "a plethora of evidence" which contradicts the dates Hancock gives. John Hoopes, an archaeologist who has written about pseudoarcheology, said the series fails to present alternative interpretations or evidence contradicting Hancock. Archaeologist David Connolly said that Hancock's work relied on cherry-picked evidence for his claims, noting, "what he'll do is take a piece of real research [by others], insert a piece of 'why not?' and then finish it off with a bit of real research [by others]". Dr. Colin Elder, supervising archaeologist at the University of Salford, said Hancock is "not trying to corroborate with multiple sources ... He's finding one person who agrees with him, and putting them on TV. He's not looking at the counterarguments". In the same vein, archaeologist Julien Riel-Salvatore argues that it is simple, from a scientific point of view, to demonstrate that the main theses of Ancient Apocalypse are wrong. He also believes that the series undermines critical thinking.

Answering Hancock's claims of a coverup, archaeologists said they and their colleagues would be thrilled to uncover an ice age civilization and would take Hancock's theory seriously if the evidence really existed.

Courrier International notes that Hancock's claims are never questioned on screen: in Ancient Apocalypse, he calls the archaeologists "pseudo-experts" and repeats that they treat him patronizingly, but he does not name them nor explains their arguments. The Guardian opined that Netflix had "gone out of its way to court the conspiracy theorists" with the series, speculating that Hancock's son's role as head of unscripted originals at the company may explain why it was commissioned.

Author Jason Colavito said Ancient Apocalypse was "not the worst show in its genre" but criticized it for "casting doubt on expertise, privileging emotion over evidence, and bending history to ideological ends ... making common cause with the right against academia". Writing in The Spectator, conservative commentator James Delingpole (who described himself as a "huge fan of Hancock" who finds his ideas plausible) criticized the series' production for "continually reminding [the viewer] that this is niche, crazy stuff that respectable 'experts' shun" and for portraying Hancock as "slippery and unreliable".

German scholar Andreas Grünschloß describes Hancock as misrepresenting Indigenous traditions to support his ideas, for example the descriptions of Quetzalcoatl as "white", which were a Spanish colonial invention. He says that Hancock is a writer who presents his science fiction as independent "research". In one episode, Hancock says the Megalithic Temples of Malta, built in 3600–2500 BC, were actually built ten thousand years earlier during the last ice age. Maltese archaeologists dismissed these claims. Experts in Pacific geography and archaeology characterized Hancock's claims about Nan Madol as "incredibly insulting to the ancestors of the Pohnpeian [islanders] that did create these structures", linking them to 19th century "racist" and "white supremacist" ideologies. Writing in Skeptic magazine, impact physicist Mark Boslough criticized the series' presentation on the largely discredited Younger Dryas impact hypothesis.

== See also ==
- Archaeology and racism
- Legends of the Lost with Megan Fox, a 2018 documentary series
