= Charles Hapgood =

American historian (1904–1982)

- Born: Charles Hutchins Hapgood; May 17, 1904
- Died: December 21, 1982 (aged 78); Greenfield, Massachusetts, U.S.
- Education: Harvard University
- Occupations: College professor, author
- Known for: Earth Crustal Displacement theory
- Spouse: Tamsin Hughes (m. 1941; div. 1955)

Charles Hutchins Hapgood (May 17, 1904 – December 21, 1982) was an American college professor and author who became one of the best-known advocates of the pseudo-scientific claim of a rapid and recent pole shift with catastrophic results.

== Biography ==
Hapgood was the son of Hutchins Hapgood and Neith Boyce. Hapgood received a master's degree from Harvard University in 1929 in medieval and modern History. His Ph.D. work on the French Revolution was interrupted by the Great Depression. He taught for a year in Vermont and directed a community center in Provincetown, also serving as the executive secretary of Franklin Roosevelt's Crafts Commission.

During World War II, Hapgood was employed by the Office of the Coordinator of Information (COI, which became the Office of Strategic Services in 1942) and the Red Cross, and also served as a liaison officer between the White House and the Office of the Secretary of the War. After the war, Hapgood taught at Keystone College (1945–1947), Springfield College (1947–1952), Keene State College (1956–1966) and New England College (1966–1967), lecturing in world and American history, anthropology, economics, and the history of science.

Hapgood married Tamsin Hughes in 1941 and divorced in 1955. He was struck by a motorist in Greenfield, Massachusetts, and died on December 21, 1982.

== Polar shift ==
While at Springfield College, a student's question about the Lost Continent of Mu prompted a class project to investigate the lost continent of Atlantis, leading Hapgood to investigate possible ways that massive Earth changes could occur and exposing him to the literature of Hugh Auchincloss Brown.

In 1958, Hapgood published The Earth's Shifting Crust. It denied the existence of continental drift, an idea that became supported by mainstream science a few years later. The book included a foreword by Albert Einstein. In Maps of the Ancient Sea Kings (1966) and The Path of the Pole (1970), Hapgood proposed the hypothesis that the Earth's axis has shifted numerous times during geological history. The Path of the Pole was meant as a replacement for The Earth's Shifting Crust after corrections were suggested to him. Hapgood writes in Voices of Spirit (1975): "In later discussions we discussed the theories of my book 'Earth's Shifting Crust', and he [Einstein] suggested that one of them was wrong; as a result of this I revised my book, which subsequently was republished as 'The Path of the Pole'. My own further research confirmed the truth of his observation, which involved technicalities of geophysics."

In Maps of the Ancient Sea Kings he supported the suggestion made by Arlington Mallery that a part of the Piri Reis map was a depiction of the area of Antarctica known as Queen Maud Land. He used that to propose that a 15° pole shift occurred around 9,600 BC (approx. 11,600 years ago) and that a part of the Antarctic was ice-free at that time and that an ice-age civilization could have mapped the coast. He concludes that "Antarctica was mapped when these parts were free of ice" and took the view that an Antarctic warm period coincided with the last ice age in the Northern hemisphere and that the Piri Reis and other maps were based on "ancient" maps derived from ice-age originals.

Later research concerning the paleoclimatology and ice sheets of Antarctica have discredited the interpretations by Hapgood that an Antarctic warm period coincided with the last glacial period in the Northern Hemisphere and that any part of it had been ice-free at and prior to 9,600 BC (approx. 11,600 years ago).

Hapgood also examined a 1531 map by French mathematician and cartographer Oronce Finé (aka Oronteus Finaeus). In Maps of the Ancient Sea Kings, he reproduces letters that he states he received from the chief of a U.S. Air Force cartography section stationed at Westover AFB in 1961. These letters say that at Hapgood's request, they had studied both Piri Reis and Oronce Finé maps during their off-duty hours, concluding that both were compiled from original source maps of Antarctica at a time when it was relatively free of ice, supporting Hapgood's findings. Hapgood concluded that advanced cartographic knowledge appears on the Piri Reis map and the Oronteus Finaeus map, and must be the result of some unknown ancient civilization that developed advanced scientific knowledge before other civilizations such as Greece.

According to historians Paul Hoye and Paul Lunde, while Hapgood's work garnered some enthusiasm and praise for its thoroughness, his revolutionary hypotheses largely met with skepticism and were ignored by most scholars. In the book The Piri Reis Map of 1513 Gregory C. McIntosh examines Hapgood's claims for both maps and states that "they fall short of proving or even strongly suggesting that the Piri Reis map and the Fine map depict the actual outline of Antarctica."

Hapgood's ideas on catastrophe have been presented in other works by librarians Rose and Rand Flem-Ath and author and former journalist Graham Hancock, each basing portions of their works on Hapgood's evidence for catastrophe at the end of the Last Glacial Maximum. Hapgood's ideas also figure prominently in the 2009 sci-fi/disaster movie 2012.

== Acámbaro figures ==
Hapgood and Erle Stanley Gardner thought the collection of clay artifacts known as the Acámbaro figures were created thousands of years ago. The date estimate as well as the notion the artifacts were made by some undiscovered culture was rejected by archeologists and paleontologists. The figurines, which most archaeologists dismiss as an elaborate hoax, depict oddities such as non-avian dinosaurs coexisting with men and horned humans.

== Elwood Babbitt ==
Hapgood spent ten years working with New England medium Elwood Babbitt (1921–2001), attempting to make contact with notable figures from the past. Babbitt, a retired carpenter and World War II veteran, had studied trance mediumship at Edgar Cayce's Association for Research and Enlightenment. Hapgood audiotaped and transcribed a number of Babbitt's "trance lectures" which purported to come from Jesus, Albert Einstein, Mark Twain, and the Hindu god Vishnu, using the material to publish his final three books:Voices of Spirit, Through the Psychic Experience of Elwood Babbitt (1975), Talks with Christ and His Teachers Through the Psychic Gift of Elwood Babbitt (1981), and The God Within: a Testament of Vishnu, a Handbook for the Spiritual Renaissance (1982). During this time Babbitt and Hapgood's cousin, Beth Hapgood worked closely with the nearby Brotherhood of the Spirit New Age commune. After Charles Hapgood's death, Beth Hapgood assembled a final volume of Babbitt's trance lectures, Dare the Vision and Endure (1997).

== Bibliography ==
- Hapgood, Charles Hutchins; Earth's Shifting Crust: A Key to Some Basic Problems of Earth Science (1958, foreword by Albert Einstein)
- Hapgood, Charles Hutchins; Great Mysteries of the Earth (1960)
- Hapgood, Charles Hutchins; Piri Reis map of 1513 (1962)
- Hapgood, Charles Hutchins; Maps of the Ancient Sea Kings: Evidence of Advanced Civilization in the Ice Age; 1966; 1997 Paperback Reprint Edition, Adventures Unlimited Press, ISBN 0-932813-42-9
- Hapgood, Charles Hutchins; The Path of the Pole; 1968; 1999 Paperback edition, Adventures Unlimited Press, ISBN 0-932813-71-2
- Hapgood, Charles Hutchins; Mystery in Acambaro: An Account of the Ceramic Collection of the Late Waldemar Juisrud in Acumbaro, GTU, Self Published: Mexico, 1972.
- Hapgood, Charles Hutchins; Voices of spirit : through the psychic experience of Elwood Babbitt, 1975, Delacorte Press, ISBN 0-440-05983-6
- Babbitt, Elwood D., with Charles Hapgood (editor); Talks with Christ and his teachers : through the psychic gift of Elwood Babbitt, 1981
- Babbitt, Elwood D., with Charles Hapgood (editor); God Within, A Testament of Vishnu
- Hapgood, Charles Hutchins; Mystery in Acambaro: Did Dinosaurs Survive Until Recently?, 2000, Adventures Unlimited Press, ISBN 0-932813-76-3.
