= Graham Hancock =

British writer (born 1950)

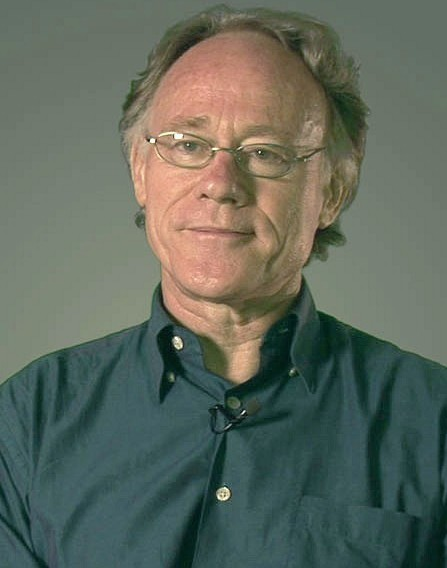
- Hancock in 2010
- Born: Graham Bruce Hancock; 2 August 1950 (age 76); Edinburgh, Scotland
- Education: Durham University
- Occupation: Author
- Notable work: The Sign and the Seal (1992); Fingerprints of the Gods (1995); Magicians of the Gods (2015); Ancient Apocalypse (2022)
- Spouse: Santha Faiia
- Website: grahamhancock.com

Graham Bruce Hancock (born 2 August 1950) is a British author known for promoting pseudoscientific explanations of ancient civilisations and hypothetical lost lands. Hancock argues that an advanced society with spiritual technology thrived during the last Ice Age until comet impacts triggered the Younger Dryas about 12,900 years ago. He maintains that survivors of the disaster shared their knowledge with hunter-gatherer communities in regions such as ancient Egypt, Sumer, and Mesoamerica, sparking the earliest known civilisations.

Born in Edinburgh, Hancock studied sociology at Durham University before working as a journalist for several British newspapers and magazines. His first three books examined international development, including Lords of Poverty (1989), a well-received critique of corruption in the aid system. Beginning with The Sign and the Seal in 1992, he shifted to speculative accounts of human prehistory and ancient civilisations, publishing a dozen books that include Fingerprints of the Gods and Magicians of the Gods.

Hancock's work has been widely rejected and described by most experts as mimicking investigative journalism while lacking accuracy, consistency and impartiality. His work is widely described as pseudoarchaeology and pseudohistory, and has been accused of promoting racism. His work is further described as biased toward preconceived conclusions that ignore context, misrepresent sources, cherry pick and omit evidence that contradicts his claims. Hancock's idea of an advanced ice age civilisation is a variant of the hyperdiffusionism hypothesis that has been advocated by various authors since the 19th century.

The anthropologist Jeb Card characterises Hancock's writings as paranormal and views his proposed Ice Age civilisation as a modern mythic narrative focused on secret and spiritual knowledge, with Hancock contending that members of the ice age civilisation had psychic abilities and communicated with "powerful nonphysical beings" through psychedelic use. Hancock portrays himself as a culture hero challenging what he perceives to be academic dogmatism. He presents his work as more valid than professional archaeology and as "a path to truly understanding reality and the spiritual elements denied by materialist science", even while citing science to support his ideas. He has not submitted his writings for scholarly peer review, and they have not been published in academic journals.

Hancock has written two fantasy novels and in 2013 delivered a controversial TEDx talk promoting the psychoactive drink ayahuasca. His ideas have inspired several films and he presented the Netflix series Ancient Apocalypse (2022) based on his theories. He makes regular appearances on the podcast The Joe Rogan Experience to promote his claims.

== Early life and journalism ==
Graham Bruce Hancock was born in Edinburgh, Scotland, on 2 August 1950. At the age of three he and his parents moved to India, where his father worked as a surgeon. After returning to the United Kingdom, Hancock graduated from Durham University with a degree in sociology in 1973.

Hancock reported for British newspapers including The Times, The Sunday Times, The Independent and The Guardian. He co-edited New Internationalist magazine from 1976 to 1979 and served as the East Africa correspondent for The Economist from 1981 to 1983. His first books focused on economic and social development in developing countries. Lords of Poverty: The Power, Prestige, and Corruption of the International Aid Business (1989) drew on his reporting about international aid for The Economist and argued that entrenched corruption made the aid system irredeemable, describing it as "inherently bad, bad to the bone, and utterly beyond reform". Reviewers praised the book's forceful critique of global aid, although many disputed Hancock's conclusion that aid is inherently harmful.

Hancock later acknowledged missteps during this period, including what he described as "friendly personal terms" with the Somali dictator Siad Barre and links to the Ethiopian dictator Mengistu Haile Mariam. He wrote a favourable profile of Barre for The Independent, noting that the regime facilitated parts of his trip and conceding that he "definitely made a mistake" by establishing those connections. He has said that by 1987 he was "pretty much permanently stoned" because he believed cannabis improved his writing.

== Later writing ==
The publication of The Sign and the Seal: The Quest for the Lost Ark of the Covenant in 1992 marked a career transition from his earlier development reporting to books pursuing speculative through lines among archaeological, historical and cross-cultural material. Reporting by The Independent in 1995 described how he pivoted in 1989 from work with the Barre regime to researching the Ark of the Covenant, an effort that led to The Sign and the Seal. His subsequent titles include Fingerprints of the Gods, Magicians of the Gods, Keeper of Genesis, (Note: Keeper of Genesis was released in the US as Message of the Sphinx.) The Mars Mystery, Heaven's Mirror (with Santha Faiia), Underworld: The Mysterious Origins of Civilization and Talisman: Sacred Cities, Secret Faith (with Robert Bauval).

Hancock's first novel, Entangled: The Eater of Souls, launched a planned fantasy series in 2010 that follows "two brave young women" who "do battle with a demon who travels through time." The story emerged from his ayahuasca experiences, which he said gave him "a series of intense visions" revealing the characters and plot. He described writing it as "tremendous fun", free from the academic scrutiny of his non-fiction work, joking "What was there to lose when my critics already described my factual books as fiction?".

=== The Sign and the Seal (1992) ===
The Sign and the Seal chronicles Hancock's investigation of how the Ark of the Covenant might have travelled from ancient Israel to Ethiopia. He follows a path through Elephantine and Tana Qirqos and connects the story to mediaeval Ethiopia and the Knights Templar. Jonathan Kirsch of the Los Angeles Times described the book as "part travelogue, part true-adventure, part mystery-thriller" yet concluded that it was "a whacking big dose of amateur scholarship alloyed with a fervid imagination." Kirkus Reviews noted Hancock's claim "that the Lost Ark of the Covenant really exists" and framed the project as an extension of his Ethiopian reportage and speculation.

=== Fingerprints of the Gods (1995) ===
Hancock's Fingerprints of the Gods: The Evidence of Earth's Lost Civilization (1995) argues that an advanced society perished at the end of the last Ice Age and that its survivors transmitted astronomical and architectural knowledge to later cultures. The narrative reads monuments in the Americas, Africa and Asia as fragments of that inheritance. The archaeologist Garrett G. Fagan wrote that the book drags "artefacts, monuments, entire cities, or whole cultures" into a predetermined conclusion while ignoring their historical contexts. Kenneth Feder observed that Hancock's thesis reflected diffusionist arguments that had circulated for decades and concluded that it offered nothing original.

=== The Message of the Sphinx (1996) ===
The Message of the Sphinx: A Quest for the Hidden Legacy of Mankind, (published as Keeper of Genesis in the United Kingdom) is a pseudoarchaeology book written by Hancock and Robert Bauval in 1996 which argues that the creation of the Sphinx and Pyramids occurred as far back as 10,500 BC using astronomical data. Working from the premise that the Giza pyramid complex encodes a message, the book begins with the fringe Sphinx water erosion hypothesis, evidence that the authors believe suggests that deep erosion patterns on the flanks of the Sphinx were caused by thousands of years of heavy rain. The authors use computer simulations of the sky to claim that the pyramids, representing the three stars of Orion's Belt, together with associated causeways and alignments, constitute a record in stone of the celestial array at the vernal equinox in 10,500 BC. This moment, they contend, represents Zep Tepi, the "First Time", often referenced in the hieroglyphic record. They state that the initiation rites of the Egyptian pharaohs replicate on Earth the Sun's journey through the stars in this remote era, and they suggest that the "Hall of Records" of a lost civilisation may be located by treating the Giza Plateau as a template of these same ancient skies.

=== The Mars Mystery (1997) ===
In The Mars Mystery (1997), Hancock and his co-authors Robert Bauval and John Grigsby interpreted low-resolution Viking lander images of the Cydonia region of Mars as evidence that the so-called "Face on Mars" and a "five sided pyramid" were created by an advanced Martian civilisation later destroyed by a catastrophe, linking the "Face on Mars" to Egyptian mythology, and comparing the supposed Martian pyramid with Egyptian and Mesoamerican pyramids. They suggested that the "Face on Mars" represented a deliberate message to the people of Earth, in the words of reviewer David V. Barrett: "a warning that a Mars-like doom lies in wait for the Earth unless we take steps to avert it."

=== Talisman (2004) ===
Talisman: Sacred Cities, Secret Faith, coauthored with Robert Bauval, according to David V. Barrett, primarily focuses on "the stream of heterodox religious beliefs, from early Christianity to the 18th century.", including the Corpus Hermeticum the Cathars, Rosicrucians, the Freemasons and the Knights Templar. The book makes a number of speculative claims, including that areas of Paris are inspired by Egyptian mythology, that there are links between Solomon's Temple and the Twin Towers as well as between the Star of David and the Pentagon. David V. Barrett dismissed the book as "a mish-mash of badly-connected, half-argued theories" stating that at the end of their book they begin "promulgating a version of the old Jewish-Masonic plot", and the journalist Damian Thompson later described Hancock and Bauval as fantasists.

=== Supernatural (2005) ===
Hancock's Supernatural: Meetings With the Ancient Teachers of Mankind appeared in 2005 and applied David Lewis-Williams' neuropsychological model to paleolithic cave art, arguing that visionary experiences shaped the emergence of modern cognition.

=== Magicians of the Gods (2015) ===
St. Martin's Press published Magicians of the Gods: The Forgotten Wisdom of Earth's Lost Civilization in 2015. In it Hancock revisits his Ice Age civilisation hypothesis and links it to a proposed Younger Dryas impact event that he argues purged the planet of advanced survivors. He interprets ancient monuments as repositories of encoded warnings from that culture. Kirkus Reviews dismissed the sequel as "for the Art Bell addict" and "risible and sure to sell." Michael Taube of The Washington Times called it a "creative fairytale" even as he acknowledged its popularity. The geologist Marc J. Defant argued that Hancock constructs "a narrative on conjecture and selective evidence" and that the Younger Dryas impact claim does not substantiate his global conclusions.

== Television and media ==
Beginning in the 1990s, Hancock also fronted television documentaries that promoted his pseudoarchaeological claims. He appeared in The Mysterious Origins of Man (1996), wrote and presented Underworld: Flooded Kingdoms of the Ice Age (2002), and hosted Quest for the Lost Civilization (1998). In 2022 he presented Ancient Apocalypse, a widely viewed Netflix documentary series which critics and archaeologists condemned as pseudoscience.

=== Ancient Apocalypse & The Americas (2022-2024) ===
Hancock's theories are the basis of Ancient Apocalypse, a 2022 documentary series produced by Netflix, where Hancock's son Sean is "senior manager of unscripted originals". In the series, Hancock outlines his long-held belief that there was an advanced civilisation during the last ice age, that it was destroyed following comet impacts around 12,000 years ago, and that its survivors introduced agriculture, monumental architecture, and astronomy to hunter-gatherers around the world. He attempts to show how several ancient monuments and natural features are evidence of this, and he repeatedly claims that archaeologists are ignoring or covering up this alleged evidence.

Archaeologists and other experts reject the claims made in the series as pseudoscience relying on cherry picked or scant evidence and allege that the series fails to present counter-evidence. Other commentators criticised the series for unfounded accusations that "mainstream archaeology" conspires against Hancock's ideas. Archaeologists linked Hancock's claims to "white supremacist" ideologies from the 19th century, which they say are insulting to the ancestors of indigenous peoples who built the monuments. A Maltese archaeologist who appeared in an episode said her interview had been manipulated. The Society for American Archaeology (SAA) objected to the classification of the series as a documentary and asked Netflix to relabel it as science fiction. The SAA argued that the show vilifies archaeologists with aggressive rhetoric, draws on theories associated with racist white supremacist ideologies, harms indigenous peoples, emboldens extremists, and offers no archaeological evidence for an "advanced, global Ice Age civilization".

Netflix released the second series Ancient Apocalypse: The Americas in October 2024, with Keanu Reeves joining the cast. This series visits sites across North and South America, from White Sands fossil footprints in New Mexico, large-scale geoglyphs in the western Amazon, Rapa Nui, Andean centres such as Sacsayhuamán, and monumental sites in Mesoamerica, including Palenque and Chichen Itza. The narrative repeated Hancock's claim that a sophisticated ice age culture transmitted astronomy and engineering knowledge to later populations after a cataclysm, and proposed cross-cultural linkages among myths and iconography.

In July 2024, before release, producers dropped planned filming in the United States after objections by Indigenous groups to Hancock's portrayal of Native histories. The Guardian reported documented permit issues at Grand Canyon and Chaco Canyon and the subsequent relocation of production to other countries.

The second series drew detailed rebuttals from academic specialists and science writers. Johnny Loftus wrote in Decider, "Ancient Apocalypse: The Americas is only interested in using legitimate scientific research as cheap fodder for the grandiose, unproven theories of one guy, who also seems convinced that every single archaeologist ever has been out to get him." He added that "Graham Hancock loves a sweeping turn of phrase like 'the fog of amnesia about our ancient past.' But what he loves more is to give voice to what feels like a lasting personal vendetta against entire fields of professional science." Critics argued that the White Sands trackways do not support a narrative of technological civilisers, that Amazonian geoglyphs and terra preta reflect regional developments rather than imported ice age knowledge, and that proposed long range iconographic links are subjective comparisons without testable mechanisms.

=== Other media appearances ===
Hancock delivered the 2013 TEDx presentation "The War on Consciousness" describing his use of ayahuasca, an Amazonian brew containing the hallucinogenic compound DMT, and argued adults should be allowed to use it responsibly for self-improvement and spiritual growth. He stated that for 24 years he was "pretty much permanently stoned" on cannabis, and that in 2011, six years after his first use of ayahuasca, it enabled him to stop using cannabis. At the recommendation of TED's Science Board, the lecture was removed from the TEDx YouTube channel and moved to TED's main website where it "can be framed to highlight both [Hancock's] provocative ideas and the factual problems with [his] arguments".

Hancock has appeared on The Joe Rogan Experience podcast several times. In April 2024 (episode #2136) Hancock debated Flint Dibble, a professor of archaeology at Cardiff University. Fallon & Guimont found that "Dibble's more aggressive denunciations of Hancock's unfounded ideas led even many of the latter's backers among Rogan's fanbase to see Dibble – and orthodox palaeoscience – as the victor." Both Hancock and Dibble agreed that continuing archaeological research would be a great benefit to humanity.

== Pseudoarchaeology ==
Experts describe Hancock's pseudoarchaeological work as a mix of cherry picked information and a combative stance toward "mainstream archaeology". They argue that it mimics investigative journalism while remaining inaccurate, inconsistent and partial, blending myths, pseudoscience, outdated science and selectively-cited research to fit his claims. Hancock encourages distrust of archaeological expertise and responds to criticism with accusations of censorship, a pattern many supporters echo when they label critics disinformation agents.

Hammer and Swartz quote Hancock saying that his job is to undermine orthodox history and to make the strongest possible case for a lost civilisation.

Pseudoarchaeologists mislead their audiences by misrepresenting the state of knowledge, taking quotations out of context, and withholding countervailing data. The historian of ancient Rome and pseudoarchaeology critic Garrett G. Fagan highlighted two examples from Hancock's Fingerprints of the Gods (1995):

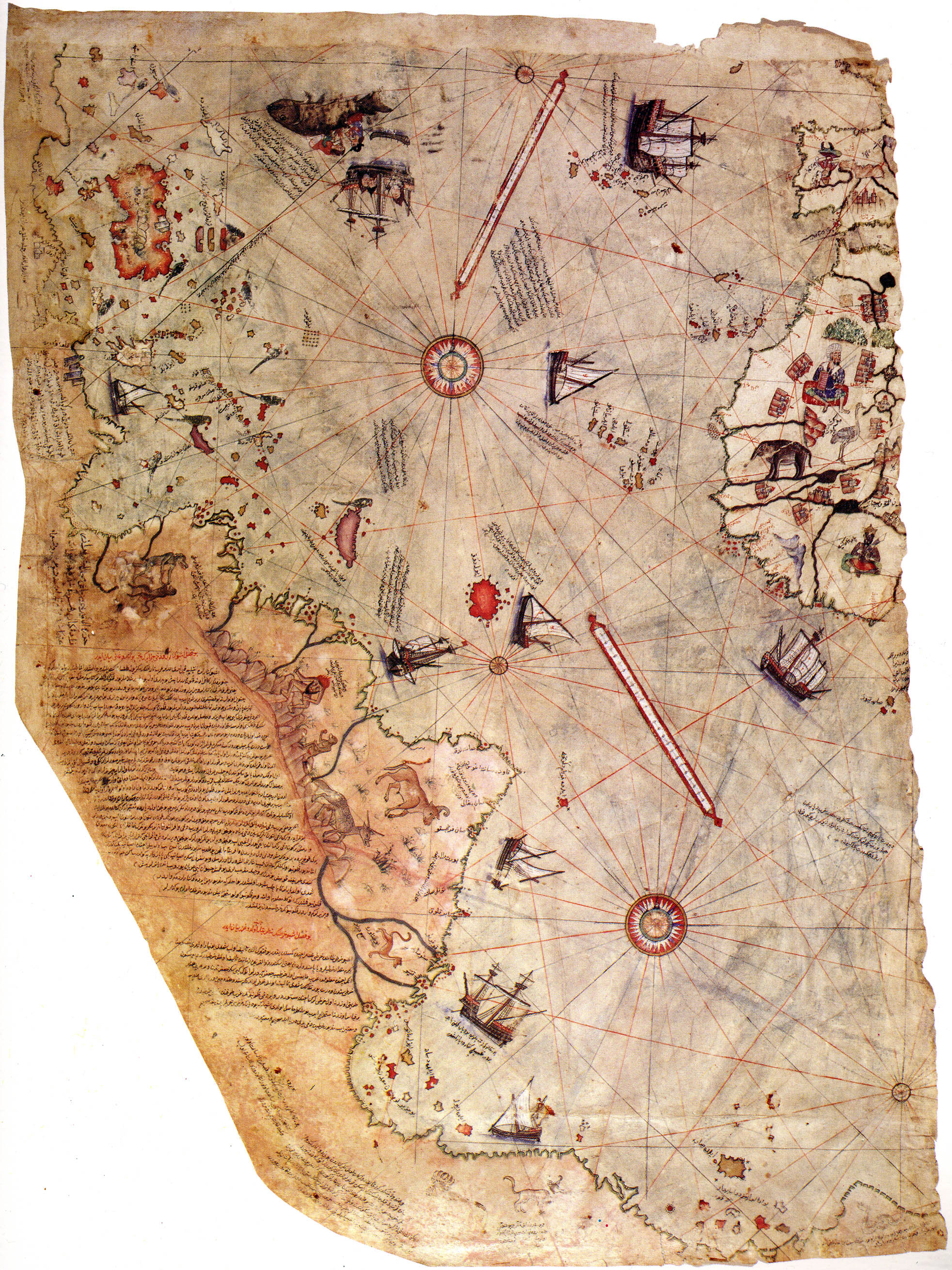
- Surviving fragment of the Piri Reis map
  Hancock wrote that "the best recent evidence suggests that" large regions of Antarctica may have been ice-free until about 6,000 years ago, referring to the Piri Reis map and Hapgood's work from the 1960s. What is left entirely unmentioned are the extensive studies of the Antarctic ice sheet by George H. Denton, published in 1981, which showed the ice to be hundreds of thousands of years old.
- When discussing the ancient city of Tiwanaku, Hancock presents it as a "mysterious site about which very little is known" at which "minimal archaeology has been done over the years", suggesting it dates to 17,000 years ago. Yet in the years prior to these statements, dozens of studies had been published, major excavations were conducted, and the site was radiocarbon dated by three sets of samples to around 1500 BC.

=== Lost ice age civilisation ===
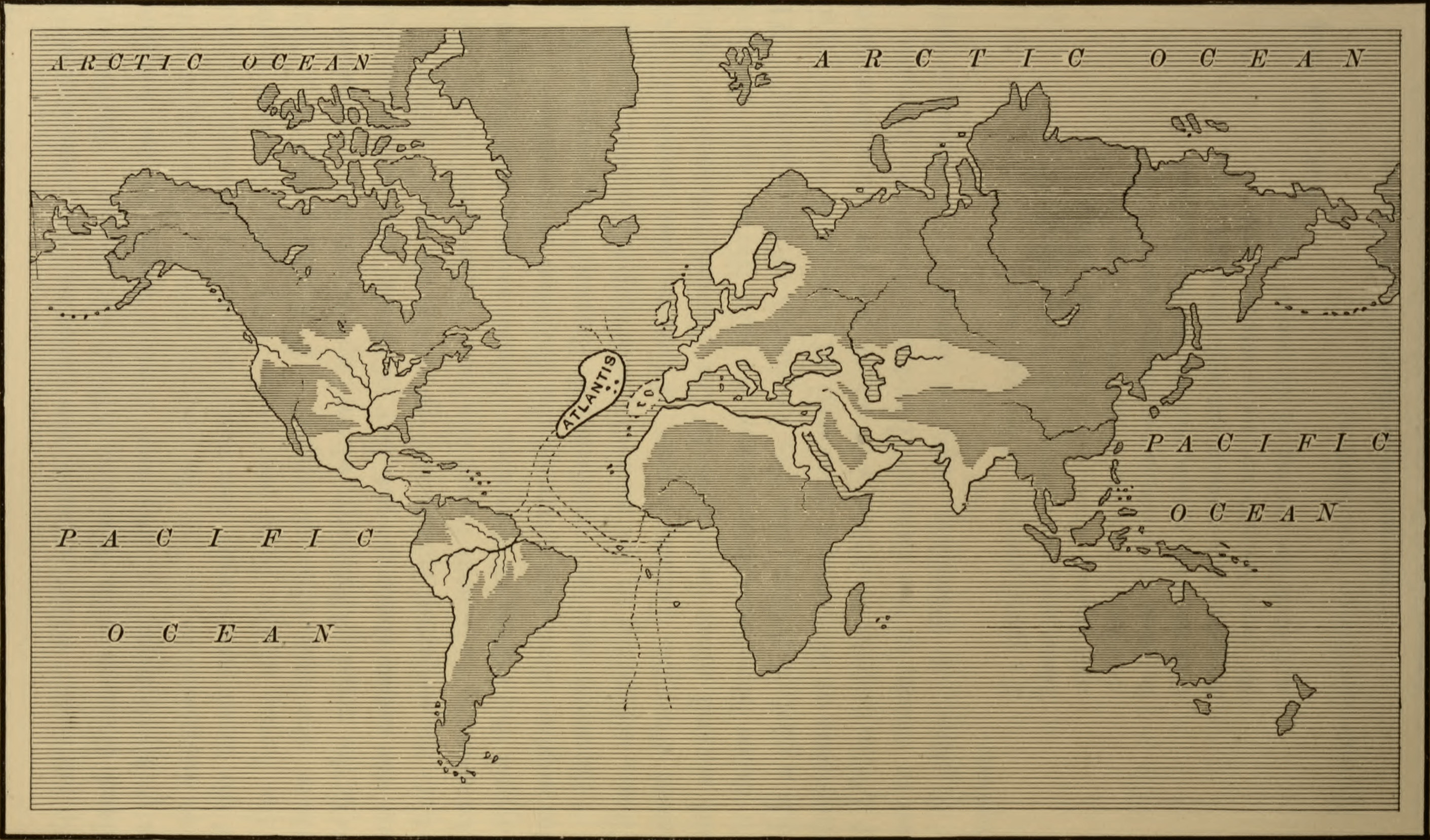
A map showing the supposed extent of the Atlantean Empire, from Ignatius L. Donnelly's Atlantis: The Antediluvian World, 1882

Hancock's central thesis claims an advanced civilisation flourished during the last Ice Age before a global disaster destroyed it. He argues that a handful of survivors carried their knowledge across the world and seeded the earliest known civilisations. He rejects the idea that these societies could have developed independently or arrived at similar ideas through convergence. Scholars identify the thesis as hyperdiffusionism, heavily drawing on Ignatius L. Donnelly's Atlantis: The Antediluvian World (1882), which Hancock cites as an influence. Researchers state that the hypothesis lacks evidence, reflects a bias toward Western civilisation, and oversimplifies complex cultural histories.

To explain the disappearance of his ice age civilisation, Hancock embraces the Younger Dryas impact hypothesis, which has little support in the scientific community. He argues that the civilisation was destroyed around 12,000 years ago by sudden climate change during the Younger Dryas cool period, which he attributes to an impact winter caused by a massive meteor bombardment.

Hancock claims that the few survivors of the catastrophe reached regions such as Egypt, Mesopotamia and Mesoamerica, where they shared agricultural techniques, monumental architecture and astronomy with hunter-gatherer communities. He believes the resulting monuments encode astronomical data intended to warn future generations. Critics note that the story assumes the Ice Age civilisation lacked a reliable writing system, fails to explain why the warning appears differently across cultures, and relies on codes that professional researchers overlooked for generations. Hancock argues that this knowledge was passed down through symbolism.

Hancock believes that these events are preserved in various myths, such as Plato's story of Atlantis, and that the Atlanteans were remembered as "magicians and gods".

Hancock has accepted the fringe theories of other Atlantis proponents regarding several historic sites, such as that of the geologist Robert M. Schoch (who contests that the Great Sphinx of Giza was carved over 11,500 years ago based on claims of the Sphinx having been eroded by water) or that of the geologist Danny Hilman Natawidjaja, who believes Gunung Padang to be a 27,000-year-old Atlantean structure.

The scholars Olav Hammer and Karen Swartz write that Hancock's works are "based largely on an imaginative reinterpretation of artefacts and myths that divorces them from their immediate cultural and religious contexts."

==== Spiritual technology and Ice Age civilisation as myth ====
...in my view the science of the lost civilization was primarily focused upon what we now call psi capacities that deployed the enhanced and focused power of human consciousness to channel energies and to manipulate matter.

— Graham Hancock, America Before (2019), p. 479

Hammer and Swartz report that Hancock portrays his lost Ice Age civilisation as relying on spiritual technology that channels consciousness to manipulate matter. The anthropologist Jeb Card notes that America Before (2019) describes a "global sea-based society comparable with the late pre-industrial British Empire" whose knowledge "would seem like magic even today". He writes that Hancock credits the Atlanteans with psychic abilities and claims they delivered geometric, astronomical and spiritual teachings through rituals involving psychotropic plants such as ayahuasca and peyote to commune with "powerful nonphysical beings".

Hancock also argues that meditation and psychoactive plants enabled ancient builders to move large stones, asserting that granite blocks at the Great Pyramid of Giza were raised by "priests chanting", a scenario he links to acoustic levitation. The archaeologist John Hoopes describes these views as effectively religious and rooted in New Age beliefs.

Card maintains that evaluating Hancock with the tools of professional archaeology is futile because he works within a paranormal milieu and his ice age civilisation serves as a mythic narrative, labelling him "not a failed version of an archaeologist" but a "successful mythographer of a post-science age", and that Hancock presents his theory as "a path to truly understanding reality and the spiritual elements denied by materialist science". Hammer and Swartz, scholars of new religious movements, likewise describe him as a "bricoleur who creates a myth from a motley selection of cultural elements".

==== Racist implications ====
The author Jason Colavito criticises Hancock for drawing on racist sources. He cites Donnelly, whose "mound builder myth" argued that the Indigenous peoples of the Americas could not have built monumental structures and credited them to white Atlanteans. Hancock distances himself from that conclusion yet does not explain how capable Indigenous societies support his story of a superior lost civilisation transferring advanced science and technology to them.

Although Hancock has identified the Atlanteans as Indigenous Americans, he wrote in Fingerprints of the Gods that they were "white [and] auburn-haired". He relies on outdated race science to argue that pre-Columbian societies included "Caucasoids" and "Negroids", claims he bases on his readings of Indigenous art and mythology.

Hancock described the Maya as "semi-civilized" with "generally unremarkable" achievements to support his thesis that they inherited their calendar from a much older society. He denies being racist and has expressed support for Indigenous rights.

=== Orion correlation theory ===
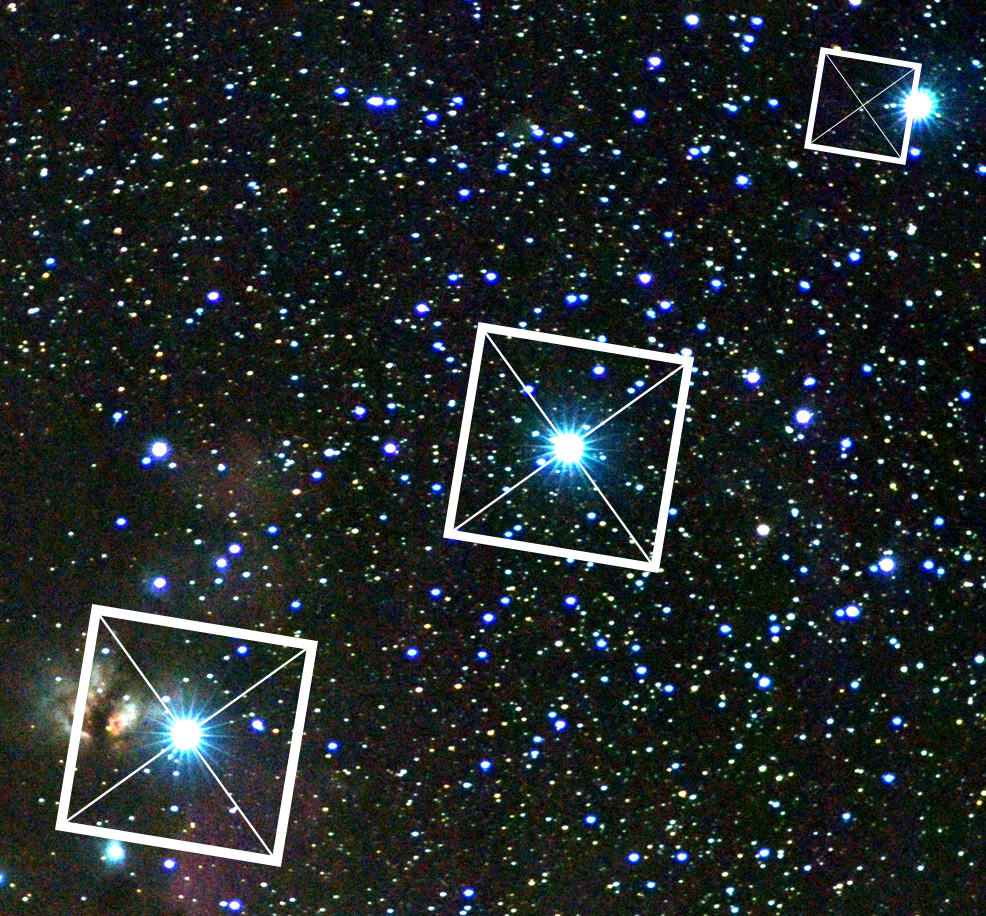
Representation of the central tenet of the Orion correlation theory showing the Giza pyramids aligned with the stars in Orion's Belt. Astronomers reject this alleged match.

Hancock frequently promotes Robert Bauval's Orion correlation theory (OCT), which claims that the three largest pyramids of the Giza pyramid complex were positioned to mirror the three stars of Orion's Belt. OCT notes that the pyramids align with the cardinal directions within a fraction of a degree, yet the astronomer Tony Fairall points out that the stellar alignment misses by more than five degrees.

Hancock and Bauval's OCT was the focus of Atlantis Reborn, a 1999 episode of the BBC documentary series Horizon. The programme mocked the theory by showing that the constellation Leo could be mapped onto famous New York landmarks and argued that Hancock cherry-picked temple locations to suit his claims. It concluded, "as long as you have enough points and you don't need to make every point fit, you can find virtually any pattern you want."

After the broadcast, Hancock and Bauval complained to the Broadcasting Standards Commission, which ruled that "the programme makers acted in good faith in their examination of the theories". The commission upheld one complaint, agreeing that the programme omitted a rebuttal of the astronomer Edwin Krupp. The BBC aired the revised version Atlantis Reborn Again the following year, allowing Hancock and Bauval to present additional responses to Krupp.

=== In popular culture ===
Roland Emmerich, director of the disaster film 2012, cited Fingerprints of the Gods in the credits an inspiration for the film, stating: "I always wanted to do a biblical flood movie, but I never felt I had the hook. I first read about the Earth's Crust Displacement Theory in Graham Hancock's Fingerprints of the Gods."

== Works ==
=== Books ===
- Hancock, Graham (1985). Ethiopia: The Challenge of Hunger. London: V. Gollancz. ISBN 0-575-03680-X.
- Hancock, Graham; Enver Carim (1986). AIDS: The Deadly Epidemic. London: V. Gollancz. ISBN 0-575-03837-3.
- Hancock, Graham (1989). Lords of Poverty: The Power, Prestige, and Corruption of the International Aid Business. Boston: Atlantic Monthly Press. ISBN 0-87113-253-2.
- Hancock, Graham (1992). The Sign and the Seal: The Quest for the Lost Ark of the Covenant. New York: Crown. ISBN 0-517-57813-1.
- Hancock, Graham (1995). Fingerprints of the Gods: The Evidence of Earth's Lost Civilization. New York: Crown Publishers. ISBN 0-517-59348-3.
- Hancock, Graham; Robert Bauval (1996). The Message of the Sphinx: A Quest for the Hidden Legacy of Mankind. New York: Crown Publishers. ISBN 0-517-70503-6. Published in the United Kingdom as Hancock, Graham; Robert Bauval (1996). Keeper of Genesis: A Quest for the Hidden Legacy of Mankind. London: Heinemann. ISBN 0-434-00302-6.
- Hancock, Graham (1998). The Mars Mystery: A Tale of the End of Two Worlds. London: Michael Joseph. ISBN 0-7181-4314-0.
- Hancock, Graham; Santha Faiia (1998). Heaven's Mirror: Quest for the Lost Civilization. New York: Crown Publishers. ISBN 0-517-70811-6.
- Hancock, Graham; Faiia, Santha (2001). Fingerprints of the Gods: The Quest Continues (New Updated ed.). New York: Crown Century. ISBN 0-7126-7906-5.
- Hancock, Graham (2002). Underworld: The Mysterious Origins of Civilization. New York: Crown. ISBN 1-4000-4612-2.
- Hancock, Graham; Robert Bauval (2004). Talisman: Sacred Cities, Secret Faith. Tisbury: Element Books. ISBN 0-00-719036-0.
- Hancock, Graham (2005). Supernatural: Meeting with the Ancient Teachers of Mankind. London: Century. ISBN 1-84413-681-7.
- Hancock, Graham (2010). Entangled: The Eater of Souls. New York: The Disinformation Company. ISBN 978-1-934708-56-9.
- Hancock, Graham (2013). War God: Nights of the Witch. Coronet. ISBN 978-1-444734-37-9.
- Hancock, Graham (2015). Magicians of the Gods: The Forgotten Wisdom of Earth's Lost Civilisation. Coronet. ISBN 9781444779677.
- Hancock, Graham (2019). America Before: The Key to Earth's Lost Civilization. St. Martin's Press. ISBN 9781250243737.

=== Video ===
- Pole to Pole with Michael Palin - Crossing the Line (EP 5) (1992)
- The Mysterious Origins of Man (1996)
- Quest for the Lost Civilization - Acorn Media (1998)
- Atlantis Reborn Again - BBC Horizon (2000)
- Underworld: Flooded Kingdoms of the Ice Age (2002)
- Earth Pilgrims - Earth Pilgrims Inc. (2010)
- "The War on Consciousness" - TEDx (2013)
- Ancient Apocalypse (2022)
