= Garrett G. Fagan =

Irish American historian of Ancient Rome (1963–2017)

Garrett George Fagan (13 January 1963 – 11 March 2017) was an Irish American historian, singer and writer known for his research in the various areas of Roman history, as well as his critique of pseudoarchaeology. He was Professor of Ancient History at Penn State University.

Fagan earned a BA (1985) with honors in Ancient History and Archaeology and Biblical Studies and an MLitt in Classics (1987) from Trinity College, Dublin, and a PhD from McMaster University (1993). He was a visiting professor at Davidson College in 1993–94 and held a Killam Postdoctoral Fellowship at the University of British Columbia in 1995–96. He began teaching on a visiting appointment at Penn State in 1996, was made an assistant professor in 1997, and then associate professor (2002) and professor (2011). Fagan held an Alexander von Humboldt Fellowship at the University of Cologne in 2003–04 and was the Andrew W. Mellon Professor-in-Charge at the Intercollegiate Center for Classical Studies. (2015–16). He was featured as a historian in the 2008 documentary series Rome: Rise and Fall of an Empire. Fagan died of pancreatic cancer on 11 March 2017 in State College, Pennsylvania.

== Published books ==
- The Topography of Violence in the Greco-Roman World, with W. Riess. (University of Michigan Press, 2016, ISBN 978-0-472-11982-0)
- The Lure of the Arena: Social Psychology and the Crowd at the Roman Games (Cambridge University Press, 2011)
- New Perspectives on Ancient Warfare (History of Warfare, Volume 59), with Matthew Trundle (Brill, 2010)
- Archaeological Fantasies: How Pseudoarchaeology Misrepresents the Past and Misleads the Public (Routledge, 2006)
- From Augustus to Nero: An Intermediate Latin Reader (Cambridge University Press, 2006)
- Bathing in Public in the Roman World (University of Michigan Press, 1999)
