= Jason Colavito =

American author

- Education: Ithaca College (B.A.)
- Occupation: Author
- Writing career
- Notable work: The Cult of Alien Gods: H.P. Lovecraft And Extraterrestrial Pop Culture
- Website: jasoncolavito.com

Jason Colavito (born 1981) is an American author and independent scholar specializing in the study of fringe theories, particularly around ancient history and extraterrestrials. Colavito has written a number of books, including The Cult of Alien Gods (2005), The Mound Builder Myth (2020), and Legends of the Pyramids (2021).

== Biography ==
Colavito attended Auburn High School, in Auburn, New York, and graduated summa cum laude from Ithaca College in Ithaca, New York, where he received a Bachelor of Arts degree in anthropology and journalism in 2003.

Colavito's work has largely focused on debunking "alternative archaeology". His work has been cited by John Kelly in a Washington Post opinion column, by Stephen Winick and Firas Al-Atraqchi in Huffington Post opinion pieces, and other publications, as well as on the History Channel.

In 2005, Colavito authored The Cult of Alien Gods: H. P. Lovecraft and Extraterrestrial Pop Culture, published by Prometheus Books. In the book, Colavito explores the influences of H. P. Lovecraft's Cthulhu Mythos on the popular works of Erich von Däniken (author of Chariots of the Gods?) and Graham Hancock, as well as its overall influence on "extraterrestrial pop culture".

In 2008 Colavito's The Science of Horror, the Horror of Science was published. The book examined the history and science of the horror genre with a particular focus on providing a broad overview and introduction to the subject. A reviewer in the Journal of the Fantastic in the Arts concluded "Academia aside, this is among the finest introductions to the horror genre I have read," and commends his epistemological approach to analyzing the genre.

In 2018 the SPLC referred to Colavito as an independent scholar with an expertise in the convergence of fringe theories with contemporary politics.

He was also interviewed for an article in Slate about the links between ancient aliens-related conspiracy theories and contemporary right-wing conspiracy theories like QAnon.

== Bibliography ==
His work has appeared in publications such as The New Republic, Slate, Esquire Magazine and Skeptic magazine.

Books (as author)

- The Cult of Alien Gods: H. P. Lovecraft and Extraterrestrial Pop Culture (2005). Prometheus Books
- Knowing Fear: Science, Knowledge, and the Development of the Horror Genre (2007). McFarland & Company
- A Critical Companion to Ancient Aliens Seasons 3 and 4: Unauthorized (2012). Lulu.com
- Faking History: Essays on Aliens, Atlantis, Monsters, and More (2013). CreateSpace
- Unearthing the Truth: An Unauthorized Commentary on America Unearthed Season One (2013). CreateSpac
- Cthulhu in World Mythology (2014). Atomic Overmind Press
- Jason and the Argonauts Through the Ages (2014). McFarland & Company
- The Mound Builder Myth: Fake History and the Hunt for a "Lost White Race", 2020 University of Oklahoma Press
- The Legends of the Pyramids, 2021 Red Lightning Books
- Jimmy: The Secret Life of James Dean, 2024 Applause

Books (as editor)

- A Hideous Bit of Morbidity: An Anthology of Horror Criticism from the Enlightenment to World War I (2009). McFarland & Company
- Unseen Horror: 15 Tales of Invisibility and the Macabre (2011). JasonColavito.com Books
- The Faust Book: And Other Early Stories of Dr. Faustus (2011). JasonColavito.com Books
- Moon Men!: A Lunar Anthology of Proto-Science Fiction, A.D. 200–1835 (2012). JasonColavito.com Books
- Theosophy on Ancient Astronauts (2012). JasonColavito.com Book
- Pyramidiots: Outrageous Theories about the Great Pyramid (2012). JasonColavito.com Books
- Foundations of Atlantis, Ancient Astronauts and Other Alternative Pasts: 148 Documents Cited by Writers of Fringe History (2015). McFarland & Company

Books (as translator)

- The Orphic Argonautica (2011). JasonColavito.com Books
- The Xipéhuz (2012). JasonColavito.com Books
