= Pseudoarchaeology =

Scientifically insubstantial theories interpreting archaeology

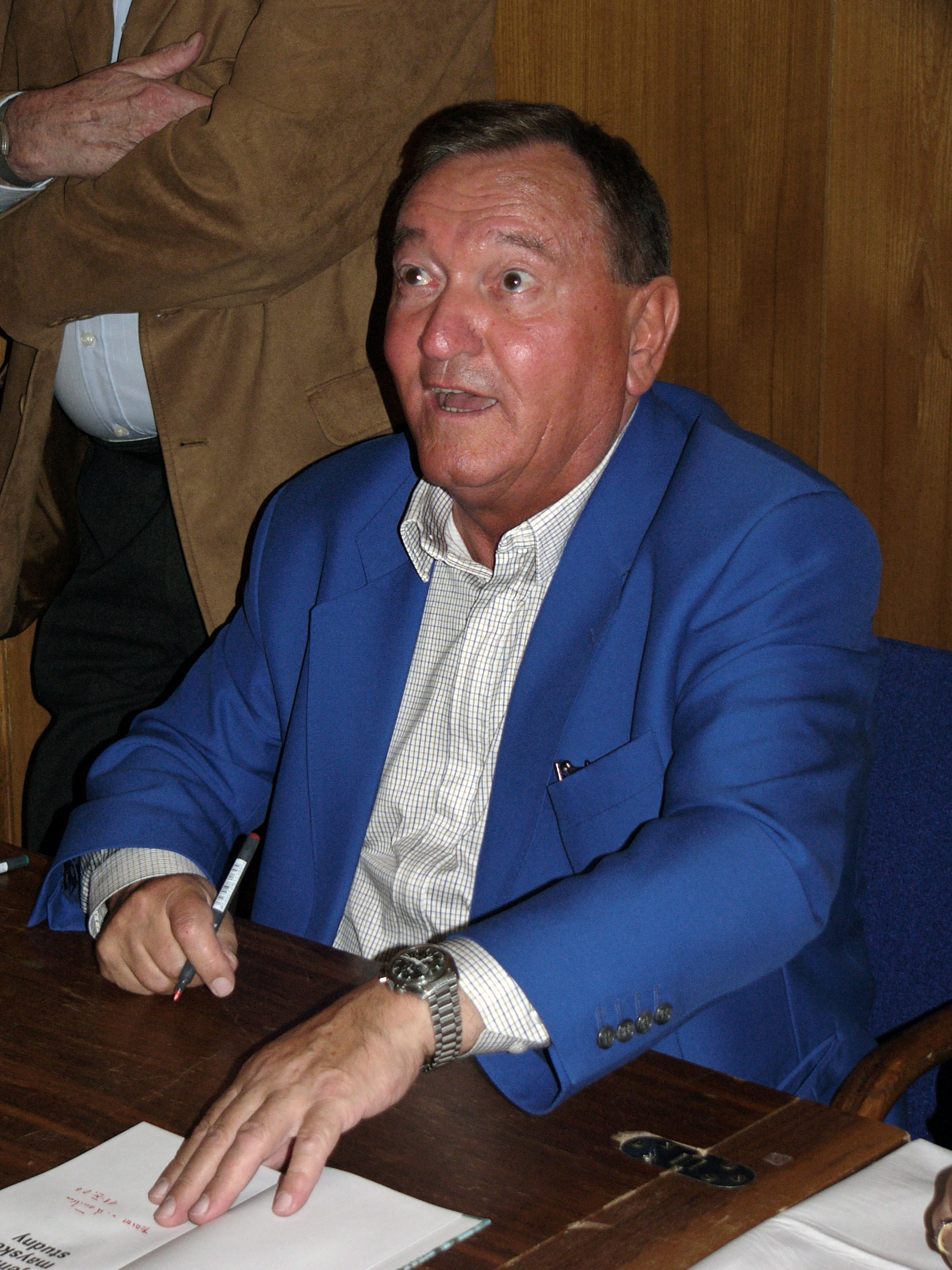
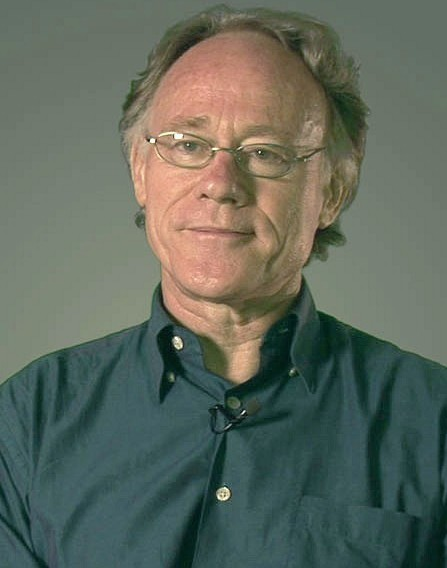
Erich von Däniken (left) and Graham Hancock (right) are two of the most widely published proponents of pseudoarchaeological opinions.

Pseudoarchaeology (sometimes called fringe archaeology and previously also called alternative archaeology) consists of attempts to study, interpret, or teach about the subject-matter of archaeology while rejecting, ignoring, or misunderstanding the accepted data-gathering and analytical methods of the discipline. These pseudoscientific interpretations involve the use of artifacts, sites or materials to construct scientifically insubstantial theories to strengthen the pseudoarchaeologists' claims. Methods include exaggeration of evidence, dramatic or romanticized conclusions, use of fallacious arguments, and fabrication of evidence.

There is no unified pseudoarchaeological theory or method, but rather many different interpretations of the past which are jointly at odds with those developed by the scientific community as well as with each other. These include religious philosophies such as creationism or "creation science" that apply to the archaeology of historic periods such as those that would have included the supposed worldwide flood myth, the Genesis flood narrative, Nephilim, Noah's Ark, and the Tower of Babel. Some pseudoarchaeological theories concern the idea that prehistoric and ancient human societies were aided in their development by intelligent extraterrestrial life, an idea propagated by those such as Italian author Peter Kolosimo, French authors Louis Pauwels and Jacques Bergier in The Morning of the Magicians (1963), and Swiss author Erich von Däniken in Chariots of the Gods? (1968). Others instead argue there were human societies in the ancient period which were significantly technologically advanced, such as Atlantis, and this idea has been propagated by some people such as Graham Hancock in his publication Fingerprints of the Gods (1995). Pseudoarchaeology has also been manifest in Mayanism and the 2012 phenomenon.

Many pseudoarchaeological theories are intimately linked with the occult/Western esoteric tradition. Many alternative archaeologies have been adopted by religious groups. Fringe archaeological ideas such as archaeocryptography and pyramidology have been endorsed by religions ranging from the British Israelites to the theosophists. Other alternative archaeologies include those that have been adopted by members of New Age and contemporary pagan belief systems.

Academic archaeologists have often criticised pseudoarchaeology, with one of the major critics, John R. Cole, characterising it as relying on "sensationalism, misuse of logic and evidence, misunderstanding of scientific method, and internal contradictions in their arguments". The relationship between alternative and academic archaeologies has been compared to the relationship between intelligent design theories and evolutionary biology by some archaeologists.

== Etymology ==
Various terms have been employed to refer to these non-academic interpretations of archaeology. During the 1980s, the term "cult archaeology" was used by some people such as John R. Cole (1980) and William H. Stiebing Jr. (1987). "Fantastic archaeology" was used during the 1980s as the name of an undergraduate course at Harvard University taught by Stephen Williams, who published a book with the same title. During the 2000s, the term "alternative archaeology" began to be instead applied by academics like Tim Sebastion (2001), Robert J. Wallis (2003), Cornelius Holtorf (2006), and Gabriel Moshenka (2008). Garrett F. Fagan and Kenneth Feder (2006) however claimed this term was only chosen because it "imparts a warmer, fuzzier feel" that "appeals to our higher ideals and progressive inclinations". They argued that the term "pseudoarchaeology" was much more appropriate, a term also used by other prominent academic and professional archaeologists such as Colin Renfrew (2006).

Other academic archaeologists have chosen to use other terms to refer to these interpretations. Glyn Daniel, the editor of Antiquity, used the derogative term "bullshit archaeology", and similarly the academic William H. Stiebing Jr. noted that there were certain terms used for pseudoarchaeology that were heard "in the privacy of professional archaeologists' homes and offices but which cannot be mentioned in polite society".

== Description ==
Pseudoarchaeology can be practised intentionally or unintentionally. Archaeological frauds and hoaxes are considered intentional pseudoarchaeology. Genuine archaeological finds may become the subject of unintentional pseudoarchaeology by persons unwittingly employing flawed interpretive methods.

The difficulty of dating clay tablets has enabled widespread archaeological forgery and associated fraud, especially in the Middle East. "By 1904, during the early period of cuneiform tablet collecting, J. Edgar Banks, a Mesopotamian explorer and tablet dealer, estimated that nearly 80% of tablets offered for sale in Baghdad were fakes. In 2016, Syria's Director General for Antiquities and Museums reported that approximately 70% of seized artefacts in the country are fakes."

Especially in the past, but also in the present, pseudoarchaeology has been affected by racism, which can be suggested by confirmation-bias-influenced attempts to attribute ancient indigenous cultural sites and artefacts to non-indigenous creators such as ancient Egyptians, Hebrew Lost Tribes, civilizations that allegedly succeeded in Pre-Columbian trans-oceanic contact, or even extraterrestrial intelligence.

Practitioners of pseudoarchaeology often criticise academic archaeologists and established scientific methods, claiming that practitioners of those methods have ignored or even conspired to suppress critical evidence.

Cornelius Holtorf states that countering the misleading "discoveries" of pseudoarchaeology creates a dilemma for archaeologists: whether to attempt to disprove pseudoarchaeology by "crusading" methods or to concentrate on better public knowledge of the sciences involved. Holtorf suggested a third method involving identifying the social and cultural demands that both scientific archaeology and pseudoarchaeology address, and identifying the engagement of present people with the material remains of the past (such as Barbara Bender explored for Stonehenge). Holtorf presents the search for truth as a process rather than a result and states that "even non-scientific research contributes to enriching our landscapes."

== Characteristics ==
William H. Stiebing Jr. argued that despite their many differences, there were a set of common characteristics shared by almost all pseudoarchaeological interpretations. He believed that because of this, pseudoarchaeology could be categorised as a "single phenomenon". He then identified three main commonalities of pseudeoarchaeological theories: the unscientific nature of its method and evidence, its history of providing "simple, compact answers to complex, difficult issues", and its tendency to present itself as being persecuted by the archaeological establishment, accompanied by an ambivalent attitude towards the scientific ethos of the Enlightenment. This idea that there are common characteristics of pseudoarchaeologies is shared by other academics.

=== Lack of scientific method ===
Academic critics have stated that pseudoarchaeologists typically neglect to use the scientific method. Instead of testing evidence to see what hypotheses it satisfies best, pseudoarchaeologists selectively interpret, otherwise distort, or even outright falsify archaeological data to fit a "favored conclusion" that is often arrived at through hunches, intuition, or religious or nationalist dogma. Pseudoarchaeological groups have a variety of basic assumptions that are typically unscientific: the Nazi pseudoarchaeologists (Ahnenerbe), for instance, used their belief in the supposed "cultural superiority" of the ancient Aryan race as a basis for their theories and for their rejection of those theories' rivals, whilst Christian fundamentalist (Young Earth creationist) pseudoarchaeologists conceive of the Earth as being less than 10,000 years old and Hindu creationist pseudoarchaeologists believe that the species Homo sapiens is much older than the 200,000 years old it has been shown to be by archaeologists. Despite this, many of pseudoarchaeology's proponents claim that they gained their conclusions using scientific techniques and methods even when it is demonstrable that they have not.

Academic archaeologist John R. Cole believed that most pseudoarchaeologists do not understand how scientific investigation works and that they instead believe it to be a "simple, catastrophic right versus wrong battle" between contesting theories. It was because of this failure to understand the scientific method, he argued, that pseudoarchaeological arguments were faulty. He went on to argue that most pseudoarchaeologists do not consider alternatives to whatever explanation they wish to propagate and that their "theories" were typically just "notions", not having sufficient evidence to allow them to be considered "theories" in the scientific, academic meaning of the word.

When pseudoarchaeologists lack scientific evidence, they commonly invoke other types of justifications for their arguments. For instance, they often use "generalized cultural comparisons", using various monuments and other artefacts from one society, and emphasizing similarities with those of another society to conclude that the two artefacts had a common cultural origin, typically an ancient lost civilisation like Atlantis, Mu, or an extraterrestrial influence. Such comparisons involve examinations of the respective artefacts or monuments entirely outside their original contexts, a practice anathema to academic archaeologists, for whom context is of the utmost importance.

Another type of evidence used by a number of pseudoarchaeologists is the interpretation of various myths as representing historical events, but in doing so these myths are often taken out of their cultural contexts. For instance, pseudoarchaeologist Immanuel Velikovsky claimed that the myths of migrations and war gods in the Central American Aztec civilisation represented a cosmic catastrophe that occurred during the 7th and 8th centuries BCE. This was criticised by academic archaeologist William H. Stiebing Jr., who noted that such myths only developed during the 12th to the 14th centuries CE, two millennia after Velikovsky claimed that the events had occurred, and that the Aztec society itself had not even developed by the 7th century BCE.

=== Opposition to the archaeological establishment ===
[Academics] have formed a massive and global network through universities, museums, institutes, societies and foundations. And this immense powerhouse and clearing-house of knowledge has presented their dogma of history to the general public totally unhindered and unchallenged from the outside. ... On a more sinister note: now this "church of science" has formed a network of watchdog organisations such as CSICOP and The Skeptical Society [sic] (to name but a few) in order to act as the gatekeepers of the truth (as they see it), ready to come down like the proverbial ton of bricks on all those whom they perceive as "frauds", "charlatans", and "pseudo-scientists"—in short, heretics.

— Pseudoarchaeologist Robert Bauval on his views of academia (2000)

Pseudoarchaeologists typically present themselves as being disadvantaged with respect to the much larger archaeological establishment. They often use language that disparages academics and dismisses them as being unadventurous, spending all their time in dusty libraries and refusing to challenge the orthodoxies of the establishment lest they lose their jobs. In some more extreme examples, pseudoarchaeologists have accused academic archaeologists of being members of a widespread conspiracy to hide the truth about history from the public. When academics challenge pseudoarchaeologists and criticise their theories, many pseudoarchaeologists claim it as further evidence that their own ideas are right, and that they are simply being harassed by members of this academic conspiracy.

The prominent English archaeologist Colin Renfrew admitted that the archaeological establishment was often "set in its ways and resistant to radical new ideas" but that this was not the reason why pseudoarchaeological theories were rejected by academics. Garrett G. Fagan expanded on this, noting how in the academic archaeological community, "New evidence or arguments have to be thoroughly scrutinised to secure their validity ... and longstanding, well-entrenched positions will take considerable effort and particularly compelling data to overturn." Fagan noted that pseudoarchaeological theories simply do not have sufficient evidence to allow them to be accepted by professional archaeologists.

Conversely, many pseudoarchaeologists, whilst criticising the academic archaeological establishment, also attempt to get endorsements from people with academic credentials and affiliations. At times, they quote historical, and in most cases dead academics to strengthen their arguments; for instance prominent pseudoarchaeologist Graham Hancock, in his seminal Fingerprints of the Gods (1995), repeatedly notes that the eminent physicist Albert Einstein once commented positively on the pole shift hypothesis, a theory that has been abandoned by the academic community but which Hancock endorses. As Fagan noted however, the fact that Einstein was a physicist and not a geologist is not even mentioned by Hancock, nor is the fact that the present understanding of plate tectonics (which came to disprove earth crustal displacement) only became accepted generally after Einstein's death.

== Academic archaeological responses ==
Pseudoarchaeological theories have come to be much criticised by academic and professional archaeologists. One of the first books to address these directly was by archaeologist Robert Wauchope of Tulane University. Prominent academic archaeologist Colin Renfrew stated his opinion that it was appalling that pseudoarchaeologists treated archaeological evidence in such a "frivolous and self-serving way", something he believed trivialised the "serious matter" of the study of human origins. Academics like John R. Cole, Garrett G. Fagan and Kenneth L. Feder have argued that pseudoarchaeological interpretations of the past were based upon sensationalism, self-contradiction, fallacious logic, manufactured or misinterpreted evidence, quotes taken out of context and incorrect information. Fagan and Feder characterised such interpretations of the past as being "anti-reason and anti-science" with some being "hyper-nationalistic, racist and hateful". In turn, many pseudoarchaeologists have dismissed academics as being closed-minded and not willing to consider theories other than their own.

Many academic archaeologists have argued that the spread of alternative archaeological theories is a threat to the general public's understanding of the past. Fagan was particularly scathing of television shows that presented pseudoarchaeological theories to the general public, believing that they did so because of the difficulties in making academic archaeological ideas comprehensible and interesting to the average viewer. Renfrew however believed that those television executives commissioning these documentaries knew that they were erroneous, and that they had allowed them to be made and broadcast simply for the hope of "short-term financial gain".

Fagan and Feder believed that it was not possible for academic archaeologists to successfully engage with pseudoarchaeologists, remarking that "you cannot reason with unreason". Speaking from their own experiences, they thought that attempted dialogues just became "slanging matches in which the expertise and motives of the critic become the main focus of attention." Fagan has maintained this idea elsewhere, remarking that arguing with supporters of pseudoarchaeological theories was "pointless" because they denied logic. He noted that they included those "who openly admitted to not having read a word written by a trained Egyptologist" but who at the same time "were pronouncing how academic Egyptology was all wrong, even sinister."

=== Conferences and anthologies ===
At the 1986 meeting of the Society for American Archaeology, its organizers, Kenneth Feder, Luanne Hudson and Francis Harrold decided to hold a symposium to examine pseudoarchaeological beliefs from a variety of academic standpoints, including archaeology, physical anthropology, sociology, history and psychology. From this symposium, an anthology was produced, entitled Cult Archaeology & Creationism: Understanding Pseudoarchaeological Beliefs about the Past (1987).

At the 2002 annual meeting of the Archaeological Institute of America, a workshop was held on the topic of pseudoarchaeology. It subsequently resulted in the publication of an academic anthology, Archaeological Fantasies: How Pseudoarchaeology Misrepresents the Past and Misleads the Public (2006), which was edited by Garrett G. Fagan.

On 23 and 24 April 2009, The American Schools of Oriental Research and the Duke University Center for Jewish Studies, along with the Duke Department of Religion, the Duke Graduate Program in Religion, the Trinity College of Arts and Sciences Committee on Faculty Research, and the John Hope Franklin Humanities Institute, sponsored a conference entitled "Archaeology, Politics, and the Media," which addressed the abuse of archaeology in the Holy Land for political, religious, and ideological purposes. Emphasis was placed on the media's reporting of sensational and politically motivated archaeological claims and the academy's responsibility in responding to it.

=== Inclusive attitudes ===
Academic archaeologist Cornelius Holtorf believed however that critics of alternative archaeologies like Fagan were "opinionated and patronizing" towards alternative theories, and that purporting their opinions in such a manner was damaging to the public's perception of archaeologists. Holtorf emphasized that there were similarities between academic and alternative archaeological interpretations, with the former being influenced by the latter. As evidence, he emphasized archaeoastronomy, which was once considered as a component of fringe archaeological interpretations before being adopted by mainstream academics. He also noted that certain archaeological scholars, like William Stukeley (1687–1765), Margaret Murray (1863–1963) and Marija Gimbutas (1921–1994) were formerly considered to be eminent by both academic and alternative archaeologists. He came to the conclusion that a constructive dialogue should be begun between academic and alternative archaeologists. Fagan and Feder have responded to Holtorf's statements in detail, asserting that such a dialogue is no more possible than is one between evolutionary biologists and creationists or between astronomers and astrologers: one is scientific, the other is anti-scientific.

During the early 1980s, Kenneth Feder performed a survey of his archaeology students. On the 50-question survey, 10 questions had to do with archaeology and/or pseudoscience. Some of the claims were more rational; the world is 5 billion years old, and human beings came about through evolution. However, questions also included issues such as, King Tut's tomb actually killed people upon discovery, and there is good evidence for the existence of Atlantis. As it resulted, some of the students Feder was teaching gave some credibility to the pseudoscience claims. Twelve percent actually believed people on Howard Carter's expedition were killed by an ancient Egyptian curse.

== Historical pseudoarchaeology ==
During the mid-2nd century, those exposed by Lucian's sarcastic essay "Alexander the false prophet" prepared an archaeological "find" in Chalcedon to prepare a public for the supposed oracle they planned to establish at Abonoteichus in Paphlagonia (Pearse, 2001):

[I]n the temple of Apollo, which is the most ancient in Chalcedon, they buried bronze tablets which said that very soon Asclepius, with his father Apollo, would move to Pontus and take up his residence at Abonoteichus. The opportune discovery of these tablets caused this story to spread quickly to all Bithynia and Pontus, and to Abonoteichus sooner than anywhere else.

At Glastonbury Abbey in 1291, at a time when King Edward I desired to emphasize his "Englishness", an alleged discovery was made: the supposed coffin of King Arthur, identified helpfully with an inscribed plaque. Arthur was reinterred at Glastonbury with a magnificent ceremonial attended by the king and queen.

== Nationalist motivations ==
Pseudoarchaeology can be motivated by nationalism (cf. Nazi archaeology, using cultural superiority of the ancient Aryan race as a basic assumption to establish the Germanic people as the descendants of the original Aryan 'master race') or a desire to prove a particular religious (cf. intelligent design), pseudohistorical, political, or anthropological theory. In many cases, an a priori conclusion is established, and fieldwork is performed explicitly to corroborate the theory in detail. According to archaeologist John Hoopes, writing for the magazine of the Society for American Archaeology, "Pseudoarchaeology actively promotes myths that are routinely used in the service of white supremacy, racialized nationalism, colonialism, and the dispossession and oppression of indigenous peoples."

Archaeologists distinguish their research from pseudoarchaeology by indicating differences of research methods, including recursive methods, falsifiable theories, peer review, and a generally systematic approach to collecting data. Though there is overwhelming evidence of cultural associations informing folk traditions about the past, objective analysis of folk archaeology—in anthropological terms of their cultural contexts and the cultural desires to which they respond—have been comparatively few. However, in this vein, Robert Silverberg located the Mormons' use of Mound Builder culture within a larger cultural nexus and the voyage of Madoc and "Welsh Indians" was set in its changing and evolving sociohistorical contexts by Gwyn Williams.

=== List of examples ===
- The Kensington Runestone of Minnesota used to allege Nordic Viking primacy of exploring the Americas.
- Nazi archaeology, the Thule Society, and expeditions sent by the Ahnenerbe to research the existence of an alleged Aryan race. The research of Edmund Kiss at Tiwanaku would be one example.
- The Bosnian pyramids project, which has projected that several hills in Visoko, Bosnia are ancient pyramids.
- Piltdown Man, a proven hoax from the early 1900s.
- Jovan I. Deretić's Serbocentric claims for the ancient history of the Old World.
- The claim that the remains of Cuauhtémoc, last tlatoani of Tenochtitlán, were found in the church of Ixcateopan. The research of Eulalia Guzmán has been proven to be a hoax, but despite that the populace of the town still claims to guard the last Aztec emperor's bones.
- Romanian protochronism also uses pseudoarchaeological interpretations; for more pieces of information, see the Tărtăria tablets, the Rohonc Codex's Daco-Romanian hypothesis, or the Sinaia lead plates.
- The theory that New Zealand was not settled by the Māori people, but by a pre-Polynesian race of giants
- Claims of a Tartarian Empire that colonized the world.
- Afrocentrist claims that Black people should be credited with creating the first civilizations.
- Temple denial and other claims by Palestinians that Jews are not native to the Land of Israel.

== Religious motivations ==
Religiously motivated pseudoarchaeological theories include the young Earth theory of some Judeo-Christian fundamentalists. They argue that the Earth is 4,000–10,000 years old, with claims varying depending on the source. Some Hindu pseudoarchaeologists believe that the Homo sapiens species is much older than the 200,000 years it is generally believed to have existed. Archaeologist John R. Cole refers to such beliefs as "cult archaeology" and believes them to be pseudoarchaeological. He said that this "pseudoarchaeology" had "many of the attributes, causes, and effects of religion".

A more specific example of religious pseudoarcheology is the claim of Ron Wyatt to have discovered Noah's Ark, the graves of Noah and his wife, the location of Sodom and Gomorrah, the Tower of Babel, and numerous other important sites. However, he has not presented evidence sufficient to impress Bible scholars, scientists, and historians. The organization Answers in Genesis propagates many pseudoscientific notions as part of its creationist ministry.

=== Examples ===
- Creation science, also known as "scientific creationism," but which is actually pseudoscientific, as it pertains to human origins.
- Repeated claims of the discovery of Noah's Ark on Mount Ararat or neighbouring mountain ranges.
- Use of questionable artefacts such as the Grave Creek Stone, the Los Lunas Decalogue Stone and the Michigan relics to represent proof of the presence of a pre-Columbian Semitic culture in America.
- New Age assertions about Atlantis, Lemuria, and ancient root races derived from the writings of authors such as 19th-century theosophist and occultist Helena Blavatsky.
- Denial of scientific dating techniques in favor of a young Earth age.
- Several places have been claimed to be the tomb of Jesus, including in India and Japan.

== Egyptology ==
Pseudoarchaeology can be found in relation to Egyptology, the study of ancient Egypt. Some of this includes pyramidology, a collection of pseudoscientific beliefs about pyramids around the world that includes the pyramids in Egypt and specifically the Great Pyramid of Giza.

=== Pyramids ===
One belief originally published by Charles Piazzi Smyth in 1864 is that the Great Pyramid was not built by humans for the pharaoh Khufu, but was so beautiful that it could have been crafted only by the hand of God. Though Smyth contributed to the idea of the Great Pyramid not being created originally by Khufu, this belief has been further propagated by Zecharia Sitchin in books such as The Stairway to Heaven (1983) and more recently by Scott Creighton in The Great Pyramid Hoax (2017), both of which argue that Howard Vyse (the discoverer of Khufu cartouches within the Great Pyramid) presented the earliest evidence that the Great Pyramid's builder) faked the markings of Khufu's name. However, Sitchin's research has been challenged as being pseudoscience. Arguments against these theories often detail the discovery of external texts on papyri such as the Diary of Merer that detail the construction of the Great Pyramid.

The theory the Egyptian pyramids were not built as tombs of ancient pharaohs, but for other purposes, has resulted in a variety of alternative theories about their purpose and origins. One such pseudoarchaeological theory is from Scott Creighton, who argues that the pyramids were built as recovery vaults to survive a deluge (whether that be associated with flood geology or the Genesis Flood Narrative). Another alternative theory for the purpose of the pyramids comes from known pseudoarchaeologist Graham Hancock, who argues that the pyramids originated from an early civilization that was destroyed by an asteroid that also began the Younger Dryas period. A third common pseudoarchaeological theory about the Egyptian pyramids is that they were built by ancient aliens. This belief is sometimes explained for why the pyramids supposedly appear suddenly in history. However, this claim is challenged by Egyptologists who describe an evolution of pyramid designs from mastaba tombs, to the Step Pyramid of Djoser, to the collapsed Meidum Pyramid, to Sneferefu's Bent Pyramid, ending with Khufu's Great Pyramid. Many alternative beliefs have been criticized as ignoring the knowledge, architectural and constructive capabilities of ancient Egyptians.

=== Mummy curses ===
Another pseudoegyptological belief is that of the curse of the pharaohs, which involves a belief of imprecations being directed against those who enter the tombs of mummies, and pharaohs. These curses often include natural disaster or illness or death for those who have entered the tomb. One of the most influential iterations of this theory comes from the discovery of King Tutankhamun by Howard Carter in November 1922. Several deaths of those present at the excavation have been attributed to a curse, including that of Lord Carnarvon who died as the result of an infected mosquito bite, sepsis, and pneumonia slightly more than four months after the excavation. There were also claims that all lights in Cairo went out at the moment of Lord Carnavon's death. However, skeptics believe that reporters overlooked rational explanations and relied on supernatural legends. In 2021, mummies discovered mostly from the New Kingdom period were to be paraded through Cairo during a transference for study. However, several events occurred, including a ship blocking the Suez Canal and accidents involving several members of the crew. Many claimed these were the results of a pharaoh's curse, however, Egyptologist Zahi Hawass dismissed the claims as random tragedies.

=== Pre-Columbian contact and Mayan connections ===
Some pseudoarchaeologists speculate that Egypt had contact with the Maya civilization before Columbus reached the Bahamas in 1492. Part of these arguments stem from the discovery of nicotine and cocaine traces found in various mummies. The argument is that plants producing these were not known to exist outside the Americas, although Duncan Edlin found that plants containing both nicotine and cocaine existed in Egypt and therefore could have been used by ancient Egyptians. Another argument against possible contact is that there is a massive body of literature in the form of hieroglyphics from ancient Egypt, however ancient Egyptian scholars never noted contacting the Americas in any of the texts that have been found.

Another argument in favor of contact between ancient Egyptians and Mayans is from claims of similarities of art, architecture and writing. These theories are explained by authors such as Graham Hancock in Fingerprints of the Gods (1995) and more recently by Richard Cassaro in Mayan Masonry. These similarities commonly mention creation of pyramids, use of archways, and similarities in artwork of the divine. Arguments such as these claim an association between ancient Egypt and Maya through either a transatlantic outing that brought Egypt to the Mayas or through a shared origin in both civilizations (either in Atlantis or Lemuria). Voyages of the Pyramid Builders (2003) by geologist Robert Schoch argues that both Egyptian and Maya pyramids result from a common lost civilization. However, ancient historian Garrett Fagan criticized Schoch's theory on the grounds that it demonstrated ignorance of relevant facts and that it did not explain variations in appearance or how various civilizations' pyramids were built. Fagan also describes known research by several archaeologists about the development of various civilizations' pyramids that was not used or addressed by Schoch's theory.

=== Flood theories and the Great Sphinx ===
For Egypt-related pseudoarchaeology, there are a variety of flood-related theories, many of which relate to the Biblical Genesis flood narrative or other flood theories. Scott Creighton claims that knowledge of a coming deluge (which he refers to as "Thoth's Flood") generated the idea of building pyramids as recovery vaults from which civilization could rebuild. Another fringe theory relating to this is the Sphinx water erosion hypothesis, which claims that the Great Sphinx of Giza's modern body appearance is caused by erosion due to flooding or rain. This theory, which has been perpetuated by Robert Schoch who claims the Sphinx was built between 5000 and 7000 BCE, has been criticized by Zahi Hawass and Mark Lehner as ignoring Old Kingdom societal evidence about the Sphinx and being flawed in citing specifics about a possible erosion. Currently Egyptologists tend to date the Sphinx sometime about 2500 B.C., approximately the reign of the pharaoh Khafre for whom the Sphinx is commonly attributed.

== Mayas ==
Many aspects of Maya civilization have inspired pseudoarchaeological speculation. In Mexico, this history can bring more people which in turn brings more money for the area, which the Maya peoples usually do not receive. Many examples of pseudoarcheology pertaining to Maya civilization can be found in literature, art, and movies. Many of them have to do with the 2012 phenomenon and the Maya calendar. These are often referred to as Mayanism, a collection of New Age beliefs about Mayas and Maya religion and/or spirituality. That said, Mayan culture has long been a subject of scientific archaeology. Archaeologists have uncovered evidence that has furthered our knowledge of the past. Some of these include stone carvings in Tikal that show the earliest stories of Sihyaj Chan Kʼawiil II and materials recovered from Chichen Itza.

=== Examples ===
- A well-known example of Maya pseudoarcheology is the interpretation of the remains of Kʼinich Janaabʼ Pakal and his burial. Pseudoarchaeologists have discussed much about the discovery of Pakal's sarcophagus lid and the answers they gained from studying it. Pseudoarchaeology author Maurice Cotterell writes about this in his book The Supergods. One of the main draws in this material for Cotterell and other pseudoarchaeologists is that the ancient Aztec and Maya people possessed knowledge beyond our imagination. From being able to "take off in spaceships", to dealing with complex numbers and equations, these people possessed "godly intelligence". Their biggest study and answer came from analyzing the Mayan calendar and finding correlations with the Sun and Earth. He states that "they (Sun, Earth, Mayan Calendar) come close together every 260 days, this agreed with his suspicion that the Mayan numbering system was connected with solar magnetic cycles". There are no professionals that endorse his statements, and his conclusions are based on insufficient evidence. Cotterell's work is pseudoarcheology because it reports his own non-scientific interpretations, without any scientific peer review or critical analysis by professional archaeologists.
- Another example of pseudoarcheology concerning Maya civilization are some conclusions gained from studying the Maya calendar. The Calendar Round seems to have been based on two overlapping annual cycles: a 260-day sacred year and a 365-day secular year that named 18 months with 20 days each. The Maya calendar also included what were termed Long Counts, these were created by priests at the time and a single cycle lasted 5,126 solar years. From the time this was created, the end of the solar years occurred on 21 December 2012. Ancient hieroglyphs from Tortuguero claimed that when this cycle ended, Bolon Yokte, the Mayan god of creation and war would arrive. Some pseudoarchaeologists assumed to mean that the world would end.
- The stone carvings in Tikal that have been important to archaeologists attempting to recreate the past, have also been used by pseudoarchaeologists to fabricate false claims about the past. In reality these carvings have been used to reconstruct the stories and history of more than thirty dynastic rulers. Some pseudoarchaeologists claim that these carvings are of ancient aliens or another form of extraterrestrial life. These claims are widely regarded as false by archeologists. When these claims were circulated during the early 1990s, the rate of tourism boomed. In cases like this, pseudoarcheological claims can often garner public attention more effectively than peer-reviewed archeology.
- Chichén Itzá in Mexico has long been an important archaeological site. Throughout the past few years there have been many wild claims by pseudoarchaeologists. The passageway beneath the Kulkulcan pyramid, a part of Chichén Itzá, was found and this is what many of the pseudoarchaeologists' claims concern. The claim is that this passageway was and still is a direct channel to the underworld. There are many possibilities for what this could have been used for, but there are not any facts to prove this statement. Many experts, including Guillermo de And, an underwater archaeologist who directed a few expeditions to uncover Mayan aqua life, believe that the passageway was a "secret cenote".

== Other notable examples ==
- The assertion that the Mound Builders were a long vanished non-Native American people thought to have come from Europe, the Middle East, or Africa.
- Neolithic hyperdiffusion from Egypt being responsible for influencing most of the major ancient civilizations of the world in Asia, the Middle East, Europe, and particularly the ancient Native Americans. This includes Olmec alternative origin speculations.
- Archaeological interest of Pedra da Gávea.
- The work of 19th- and early 20th-century authors such as Ignatius Donnelly, Augustus Le Plongeon, James Churchward, and Arthur Posnansky.
- The work of contemporary authors such as Giorgio Tsoukalos, Erich von Däniken, Barry Fell, Zecharia Sitchin, Robert Bauval, Frank Joseph, Graham Hancock, Colin Wilson, Michael Cremo, Immanuel Velikovsky, and David Hatcher Childress.
- Lost lands such as Atlantis, Mu, Kumari Kandam, Phantom islands, Tartary and Lemuria, which are all contested by mainstream archaeologists and historians as lacking critical physical evidence and general historical credibility.
- Speculation by paranormal researchers that an abnormal human skull promoted as the "starchild skull" was the product of extraterrestrial-human breeding or extraterrestrial genetic engineering, despite DNA evidence proving that the skull was that of an anatomically modern human infant, most likely suffering from hydrocephalus.

=== Pseudoarchaeology books ===
- Atlantis: The Antediluvian World
- Chariots of the Gods?
- Fingerprints of the Gods
- Forbidden Archeology
- From Atlantis to the Sphinx
- Isis Unveiled
- Magicians of the Gods
- Morning of the Magicians
- The Saturn Myth
- The Secret Doctrine
- The Sirius Mystery
- The Space Gods Revealed

=== Pseudoarchaeological television programs and series ===
- Ancient Aliens (2010–)
- Ancient Apocalypse (2022)
- America Unearthed (2012–2015, 2019–)
- In Search of... (1977–1982)
- Legends of the Lost with Megan Fox (2018)
- The Curse of Oak Island (2014–)
- The Mysterious Origins of Man (1996)
- The UnXplained (2019–2021)

=== Archaeological sites subject to pseudoarchaeological speculation ===
- Burrows Cave
- Calico Early Man Site
- Çatalhöyük
- Cerutti Mastodon site
- Chinese pyramids
- Easter Island
- Göbekli Tepe
- Great Zimbabwe
- Gunung Padang
- La Ciudad Blanca
- Lovelock Cave
- Machu Picchu
- Megalithic Temples of Malta
- Nan Madol
- Nazca Lines
- Tell el-Hammam
- Teotihuacan
- Terracotta Army
- Tiwanaku
  - Puma Punku
  - Kalasasaya at Tiwanaku
  - The Gate of the Sun
  - The Semi-Subterranean Temple
- Yonaguni Monument
- Zorats Karer a.k.a. Armenian Stonehenge

=== So-called out-of-place artefacts ===
- Antikythera mechanism
- Babylonokia (a modern artwork)
- Baghdad Battery
- Dogū
- Etruscan inscriptions
- Ingá Stone
- Nimrud lens
- Phaistos Disc
- Piri Reis map
- Stone spheres of Costa Rica

== See also ==
- Archaeological forgery
- Archaeology and racism
- Biblical archaeology
- Conspiracy theory
- Frauds, Myths, and Mysteries
- Historical revisionism
- Historical negationism
- Pathological science
- Pseudohistory
- List of topics characterized as pseudoscience
- Psychic archaeology
- Xenoarchaeology
