= Hall of Records =

Mythical library under the Great Sphinx of Giza

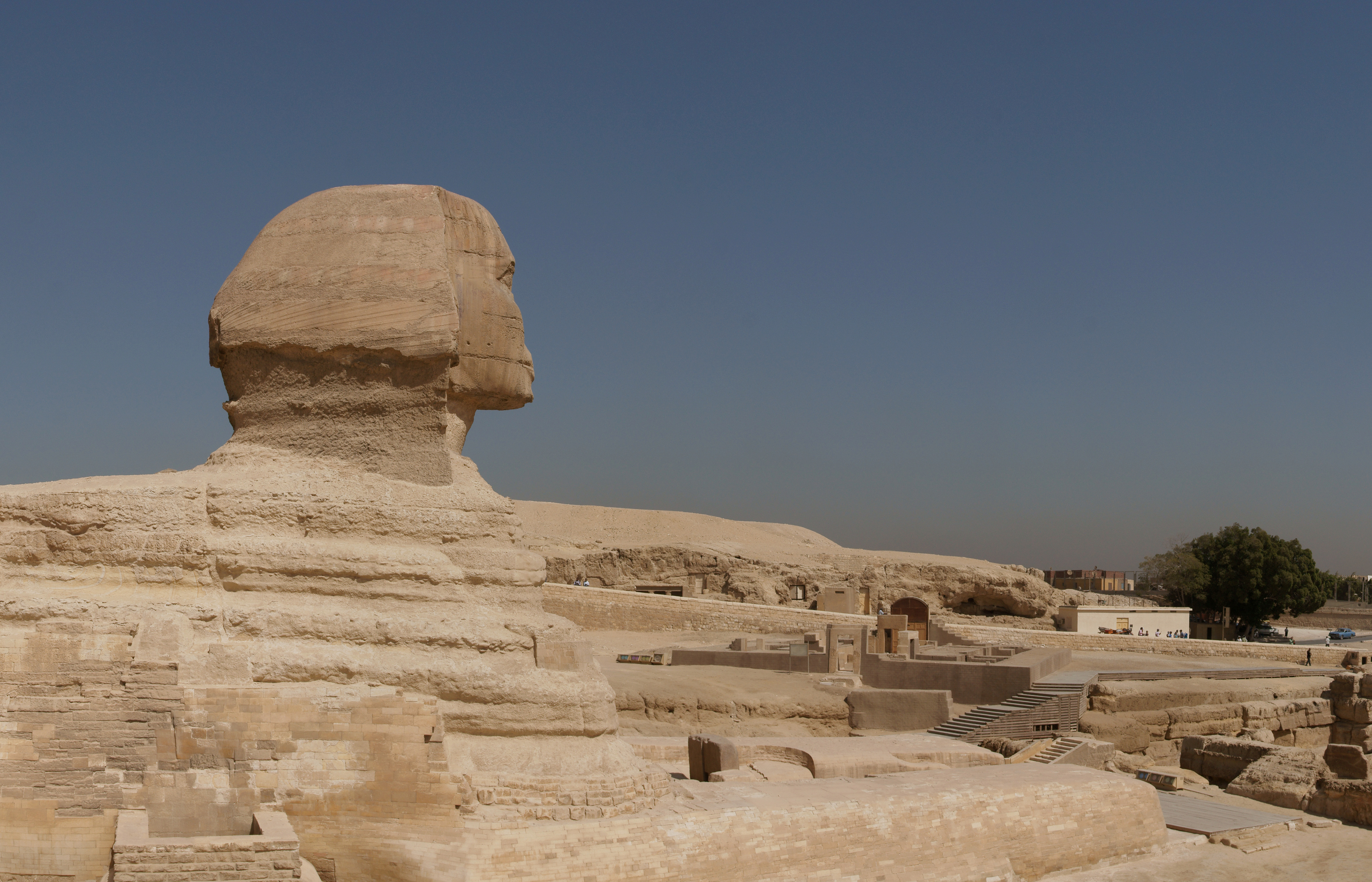
The forequarters of the Great Sphinx of Giza. The entrance to the Hall of Records is alleged to be near the sphinx's right paw (at lower right).

The Hall of Records is a purported ancient library that is claimed to exist underground near the Great Sphinx of Giza in Egypt. The concept originated with claims made by Edgar Cayce, an American who claimed to be clairvoyant and was a forerunner of the New Age movement. He said in the 1930s that refugees from Atlantis built the Hall of Records at Giza to preserve their knowledge. Cayce's assertions had many precursors, particularly the pseudohistorical theories about Atlantis that Ignatius Donnelly promulgated in the late nineteenth century, as well as claims about hidden passages at Giza that date back to medieval times.

In the 1990s, Cayce's claims about the Hall of Records became conflated with two other fringe hypotheses about the origin and age of the monuments at Giza: the sphinx water erosion hypothesis and the Orion correlation theory. Adherents of these ideas came to adopt Cayce's date of around 10,500 BC for the origin of the sphinx. Many hoped the Hall of Records would soon be discovered, thus lending credence to the occult and New Age beliefs with which these hypotheses were frequently connected. Although the increased public attention to the site prompted the full exploration of a tomb known as the "water shaft" in 1999, nothing fitting Cayce's description has ever been found.

== Origins ==
The belief in the Hall of Records has many precursors. The monuments of the Giza pyramid complex, most of which were built during the Fourth Dynasty of Egypt (c. 2500 BC), have inspired speculation and folklore about their origins and purpose since ancient times. Pliny the Elder, a Roman author in the first century AD, reported that the people who lived near the Giza Plateau in his time believed the Great Sphinx of Giza was hollow and contained the tomb of a king named "Harmais". Medieval Islamic legends asserted that there were subterranean passages beneath the pyramids there. Giovanni Battista Caviglia, who excavated at Giza in the early nineteenth century, believed a network of subterranean passages linked together all the Giza pyramids, and this claim, repeated by Howard Vyse in his book Operations Carried on the Pyramids at Gizeh in 1837, circulated widely in the nineteenth century.

The belief that ancient records were stored at Giza derives from medieval Islamic traditions about a legendary king of Egypt named Surid ibn Salhouk, which claim that Surid ruled Egypt before the flood described in the Book of Genesis and built the Great Pyramid of Giza to preserve his society's knowledge in the event of the flood. The Surid legend was translated several times into European languages, beginning with translations in the seventeenth century by John Greaves and Pierre Vattier, and became a major influence on subsequent fringe beliefs about ancient Egypt.

Another figure who influenced the concept of the Hall of Records was Ignatius Donnelly, whose pseudohistorical 1882 book Atlantis: The Antediluvian World argued that the fictional civilization of Atlantis, as described by the Greek philosopher Plato, was a real place rather than Plato's invention. Donnelly argued that Atlantis influenced numerous civilizations around the world, including ancient Egypt, before being destroyed in a catastrophe that inspired the biblical flood myth. He cited the Surid legend as evidence that a pyramid-building civilization existed before the flood, and based on the chronology of Plato's story, he asserted that the sinking of Atlantis took place around 9600 BC and that Egyptian civilization must date back that far.

More immediate forerunners to the Hall of Records are the works of H. C. Randall-Stevens and Harvey Spencer Lewis. In several publications, beginning in the late 1920s, Randall-Stevens asserted that the Egyptians built the Giza pyramids and the sphinx after the destruction of Atlantis, and that beneath the Giza Plateau lay a complex of subterranean passages and temples where inductees into the Egyptians' mystical wisdom received instruction and underwent initiation. His 1935 book A Voice Out of Egypt incorporated detailed diagrams of purported passageways beneath the plateau. Lewis's 1936 book The Symbolic Prophecy of the Great Pyramid makes similar claims, with diagrams nearly identical to those published by Randall-Stevens. Randall-Stevens claimed to be channeling his information from the spirits of Egyptian initiates, while Lewis said his assertions were based on records from his esoteric organization, the Ancient and Mystical Order Rosæ Crucis, which claims to have descended from an ancient Egyptian "mystery school". The author Jason Colavito argues that Randall-Stevens and Lewis were both imitating Masonic legends about the ancient origins of Masonic rites, with possible influence from the Islamic legends about the pyramids.

== Cayce's claim ==
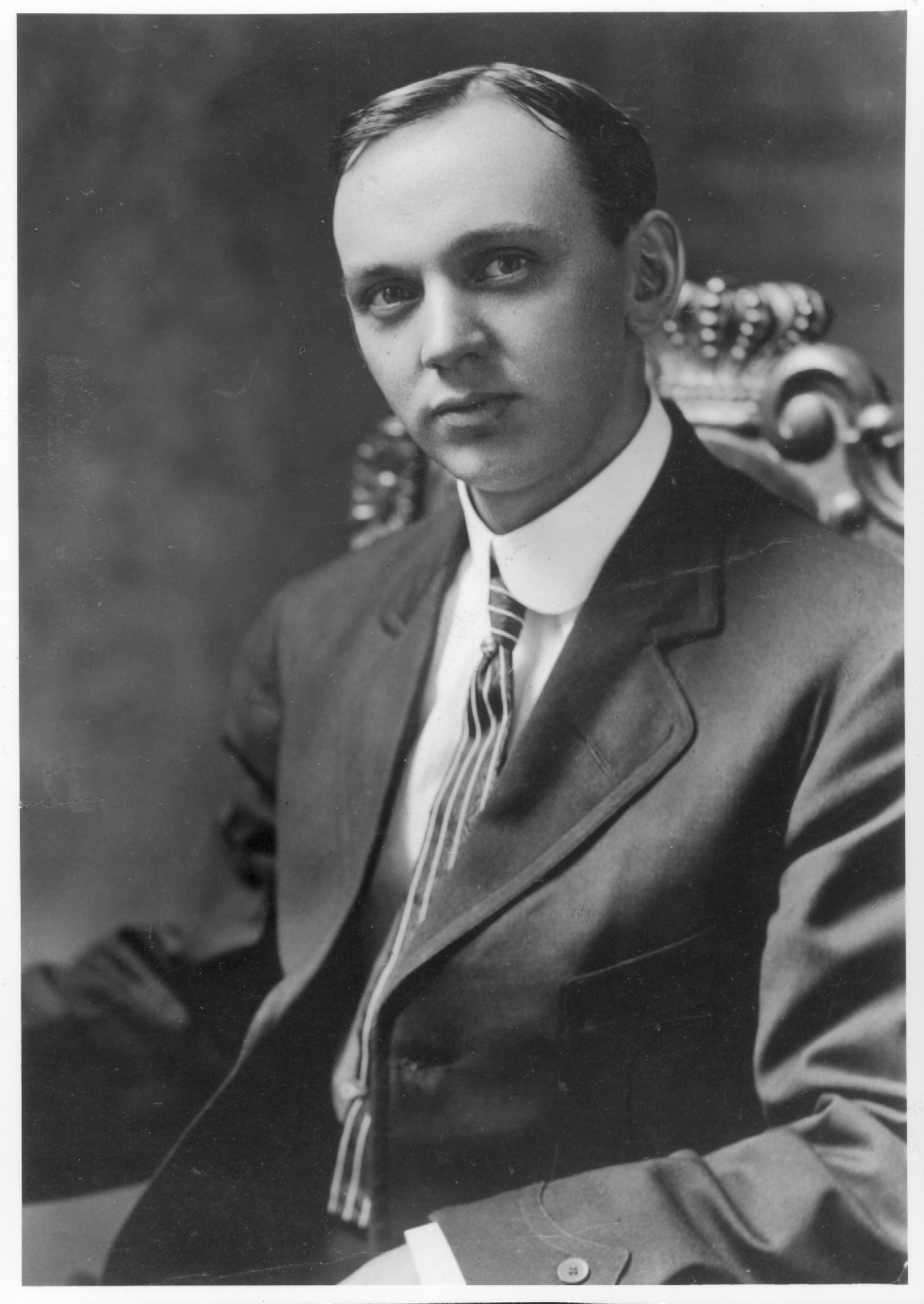
Edgar Cayce, c. 1910

The first person to use the term "Hall of Records" was Edgar Cayce, a man who claimed to be clairvoyant and was an influential precursor of the New Age movement. During the first half of the twentieth century, Cayce gave thousands of "readings", or statements made while in a trance, concerning particular people. In 1931 he and several associates founded the Association for Research and Enlightenment to promote the ideas derived from these readings. Many of the readings were medical, diagnosing the health problems of his subjects, but others described the lives that he claimed his subjects had lived in previous incarnations. He claimed that some of the subjects of these "life readings" had lived in Atlantis in their past lives, and therefore he described Atlantis in detail.

Cayce's readings often drew upon preexisting esoteric literature, sometimes citing such literature by name. His characterization of Atlantis owed much to Ignatius Donnelly, although he said it possessed advanced technologies that were absent from Donnelly's version. His description of the Hall of Records resembled the subterranean chambers described by Randall-Stevens and by Lewis and may have been derived from their works.

Cayce's readings said that Atlantis was destroyed around 10,500 BC and that Atlantean refugees brought civilization to Egypt, constructing the Great Pyramid of Giza and the sphinx within the century or so that followed. In readings given from October to December 1933, Cayce said there were three sites that served as repositories of Atlantean records: Bimini in the Bahamas, which he claimed was the sunken site of Atlantis itself; a location in the Yucatán Peninsula; and a "temple or hall of records" at Giza. He further stated that this hall lay somewhere between the sphinx and the Nile River, with an entrance near the sphinx's right paw. Later readings in 1941 stated that the hall contained records in both Atlantean and Egyptian writing systems and implied that the hall itself was pyramid-shaped. Cayce also implied that the hall would be discovered during a period of dramatic changes in the world; Cayce's adherents have connected this claim with other readings in which he prophesied massive upheaval in the years between 1958 and 1998.

== Influence ==
The Association for Research and Enlightenment has periodically supported investigations at the Giza Plateau in hopes of finding the Hall of Records. In 1978, the ARE cooperated with SRI International in an effort to detect possible chambers in the bedrock beneath the sphinx. Although ground-penetrating radar showed possible anomalies near the paws of the sphinx, test drilling in the area revealed only natural fissures in the rock.

In 1991, the ARE sent one of its members, Joseph Schor, as an official observer on a geological survey of the sphinx's environs, led by Robert Schoch, in an effort to test Schoch's hypothesis that the sphinx was eroded by water and thus several millennia older than its conventional date. One of the survey's participants, the geophysicist Thomas Dobecki, argued that seismography showed a possibly man-made chamber under the sphinx's right paw. These claims were incorporated in the 1993 television documentary The Mystery of the Sphinx, which also mentioned Cayce's prediction about the Hall of Records. Shortly afterward, the authors Adrian Gilbert and Robert Bauval put forward the Orion correlation theory, which argues that the monuments at Giza were arranged according to stellar alignments from several thousand years before the conventional date of their construction.

In 1995, the author Graham Hancock published Fingerprints of the Gods, in which he drew together the sphinx water erosion hypothesis and the Orion correlation theory to argue that the Giza monuments were built by or under the influence of a lost civilization that was remembered in legend as Atlantis. Hancock, Bauval, and John Anthony West, who had initially convinced Schoch to study the erosion of the sphinx, all advocated these claims and attracted wide publicity.

Although Schoch argued that the sphinx dated to 7000 to 5000 BC, and the stellar alignments proposed by the Orion correlation theory could relate to a wide range of dates as far back as 12,500 BC, West, Bauval, and Hancock all came to support a date of 10,500 BC for the sphinx, under the influence of Cayce's prediction. Hancock and Bauval also implied that future finds at Giza could have a transformative impact on the world, reminiscent of Cayce's claim that the discovery of the hall would coincide with other dramatic changes. They connected these transformative events with the impending beginning of the third millennium and with the astrological Age of Aquarius.

Beginning in 1996, Schor and Florida State University sponsored a further survey of possible cavities in the rock on the plateau, including the anomaly near the sphinx that Dobecki identified. In 1998, the Supreme Council of Antiquities, the government agency that oversees archaeological work in Egypt, permitted these investigators to drill into one of the anomalies they detected, near the Great Pyramid, as a test of how effective radar might be in finding man-made chambers. When the drilling revealed only a natural cavity, the council denied the investigators permission to drill elsewhere.

As these investigations produced no sign of the Hall of Records, adherents of the ideas advocated by Hancock, Bauval and West focused their attention on the "water shaft" or "Osiris shaft", a subterranean tomb west of the sphinx that was cut during the Late Period (c. 664–332 BC). Those who hoped to find the Hall of Records argued that this tomb might be connected to the hall. The shaft was first recorded by the Egyptologist Selim Hassan in the 1930s but could not be fully explored because it was flooded. Spurred by the public interest, the Egyptologist Zahi Hawass had the water pumped out and fully explored the chamber in 1999.

Nothing matching Cayce's description has ever been found. Enthusiasm over the Hall of Records waned toward the end of the 1990s as the predicted window of time for its discovery passed, and as mainstream academic criticisms of the claims about Giza came to be more widely aired.

Colavito writes that beliefs about the Hall of Records are motivated by "the idea that seeking out physical evidence of Atlantis or some other lost civilization would somehow prove that the spiritual values embodied by occult and New Age groups were objectively true... The search for the Hall of Records became a cudgel to be used against doubt, since the possibility that physical proof could be found removed the temptation to question the otherwise outlandish claims believers were asked to accept."
