= Orion correlation theory =

Fringe hypothesis in alternative Egyptology

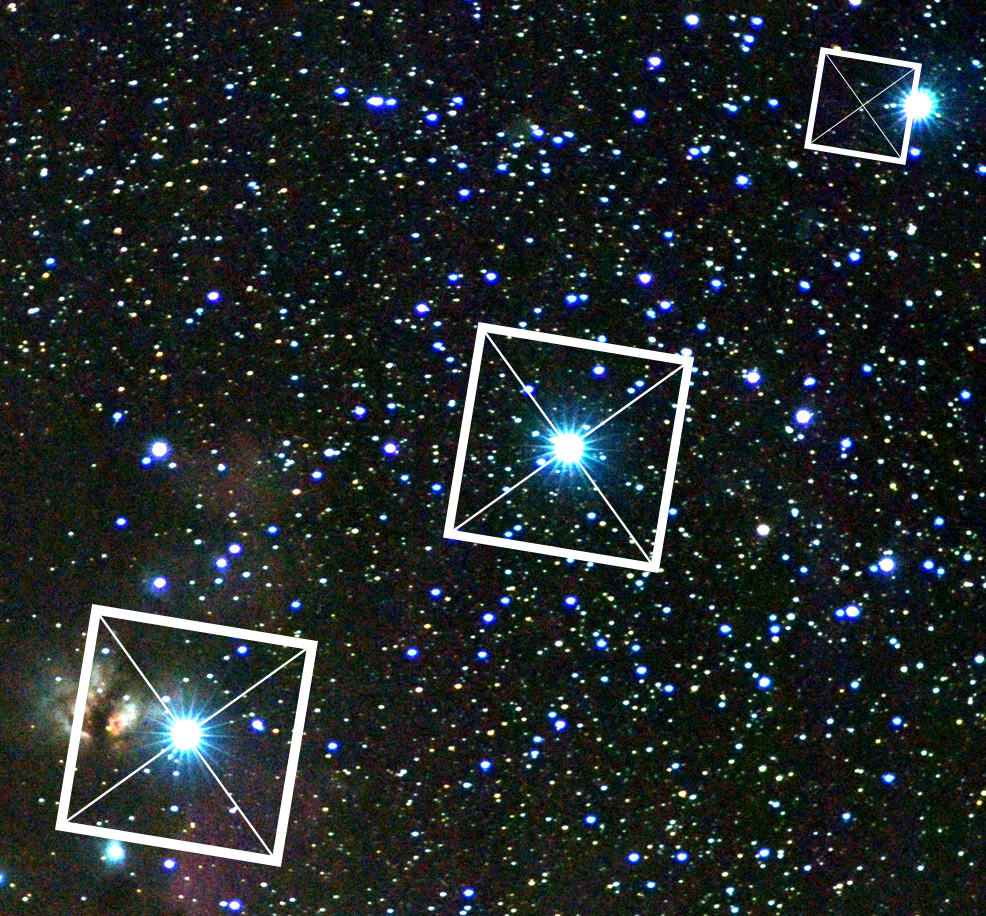
Representation of the central tenet of the Orion correlation theory: the outline of the Giza pyramids superimposed over a photograph of the stars in Orion's Belt.

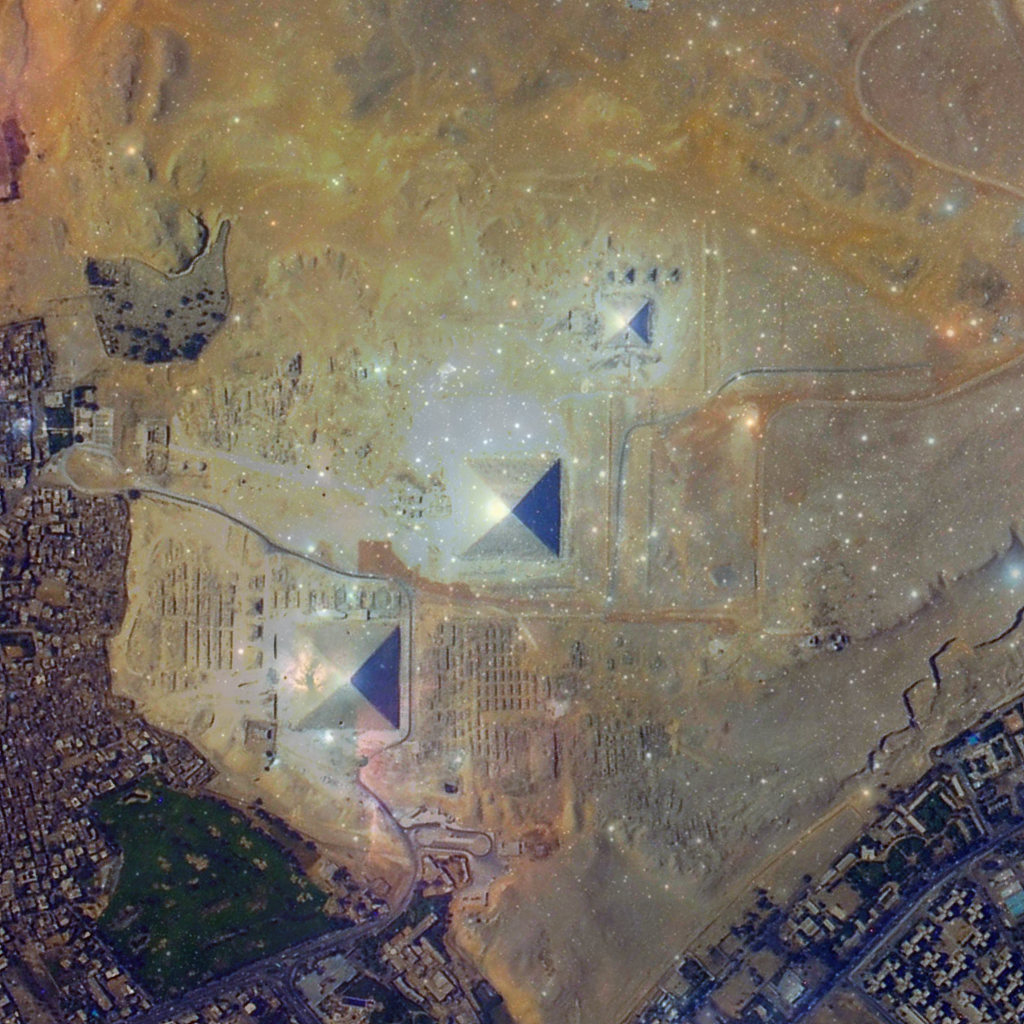
Orion's Belt superimposed on the Giza pyramid complex, illustrating the Orion Correlation Theory. From left to right: Alnitak on the Great Pyramid of Giza; Alnilam on the pyramid of Khafre; Mintaka on the pyramid of Menkaure

The Orion correlation theory is a fringe theory in Egyptology attempting to explain the arrangement of the Giza pyramid complex.

It posits that there is a correlation between the location of the three largest pyramids of the Giza pyramid complex and Orion's Belt of the constellation Orion, and that this correlation was intended as such by the original builders of the Giza pyramid complex. The stars of Orion were associated with Osiris, the god of rebirth and afterlife by the ancient Egyptians. Depending on the version of the idea, additional pyramids can be included to complete the picture of the Orion constellation, and the Nile river can be included to match with the Milky Way.

The idea was first published in 1989 in Discussions in Egyptology, volume 13. It was the subject of the book The Orion Mystery, in 1994, as well as a BBC documentary, The Great Pyramid: Gateway to the Stars (February 1994), and appears in some New Age books.

== History ==
The Orion correlation theory was put forward by Robert Bauval, and mentioned that Mintaka, the dimmest and most westerly of the stars making up Orion's belt, was offset slightly from the others. Bauval then made a connection between the layout of the three main stars in Orion's belt and the layout of the three main pyramids in the Giza pyramid complex. He published this idea in 1989 in the journal Discussions in Egyptology, volume 13. The idea has been further expounded by Bauval in collaboration with pseudoscientific authors Adrian Gilbert (The Orion Mystery, 1994) and Graham Hancock (Keeper of Genesis, 1996), as well as in their separate publications. The basis of this idea concerns the proposition that the relative positions of three main Ancient Egyptian pyramids on the Giza plateau was by design correlated with the relative positions of the three stars in the constellation of Orion which make up Orion's Belt, as these stars appeared in 10,000 BC.

Their initial ideas regarding the alignment of the Giza pyramids with Orion: "...the three pyramids were a terrestrial map of the three stars of Orion's belt" are later joined with speculation about the age of the Great Sphinx. According to these works, the Great Sphinx was constructed c. 10,500 BC (Upper Paleolithic), and its lion-shape is maintained to be a definitive reference to the constellation of Leo. Furthermore, the orientation and dispositions of the Sphinx, the Giza pyramids and the Nile River relative to one another on the ground is put forward as an accurate reflection or "map" of the constellations of Leo, Orion (specifically, Orion's Belt) and the Milky Way respectively. As Hancock puts it in 1998's The Mars Mystery (co-authored with Bauval):

...we have demonstrated with a substantial body of evidence that the pattern of stars that is "frozen" on the ground at Giza in the form of the three pyramids and the Sphinx represents the disposition of the constellations of Orion and Leo as they looked at the moment of sunrise on the spring equinox during the astronomical "Age of Leo" (i.e., the epoch in which the Sun was "housed" by Leo on the spring equinox.) Like all precessional ages this was a 2,160-year period. It is generally calculated to have fallen between the Gregorian calendar dates of 10,970 and 8810 BC.

The allusions to dates circa 12,500 years ago are significant to Hancock since this is the era he seeks to assign to the advanced progenitor civilization, now vanished, but which he contends through most of his works had existed and whose advanced technology influenced and shaped the development of the world's known civilizations of antiquity. Egyptology and archaeological science maintain that available evidence indicates that the Giza pyramids were constructed during the Fourth dynasty period (3rd millennium BC), while the exact date of the Great Sphinx is still unclear.

== Critique ==
Arguments made by Hancock, Bauval, Anthony West and others concerning the significance of the proposed correlations have been described as a form of pseudoarchaeology.

Among these are critiques from two astronomers, Ed Krupp of Griffith Observatory in Los Angeles and Tony Fairall of the University of Cape Town, South Africa. Using planetarium equipment, Krupp and Fairall independently investigated the angle between the alignment of Orion's Belt and north during the era cited by Hancock, Bauval, et al. (which differs from the angle seen today or in the third millennium BC, because of the precession of the equinoxes). They found that the angle was somewhat different from the "perfect match" thought to exist by Bauval and Hancock in the Orion correlation theory. They estimate 47–50 degrees per the planetarium measurements, compared to the 38-degree angle formed by the pyramids.

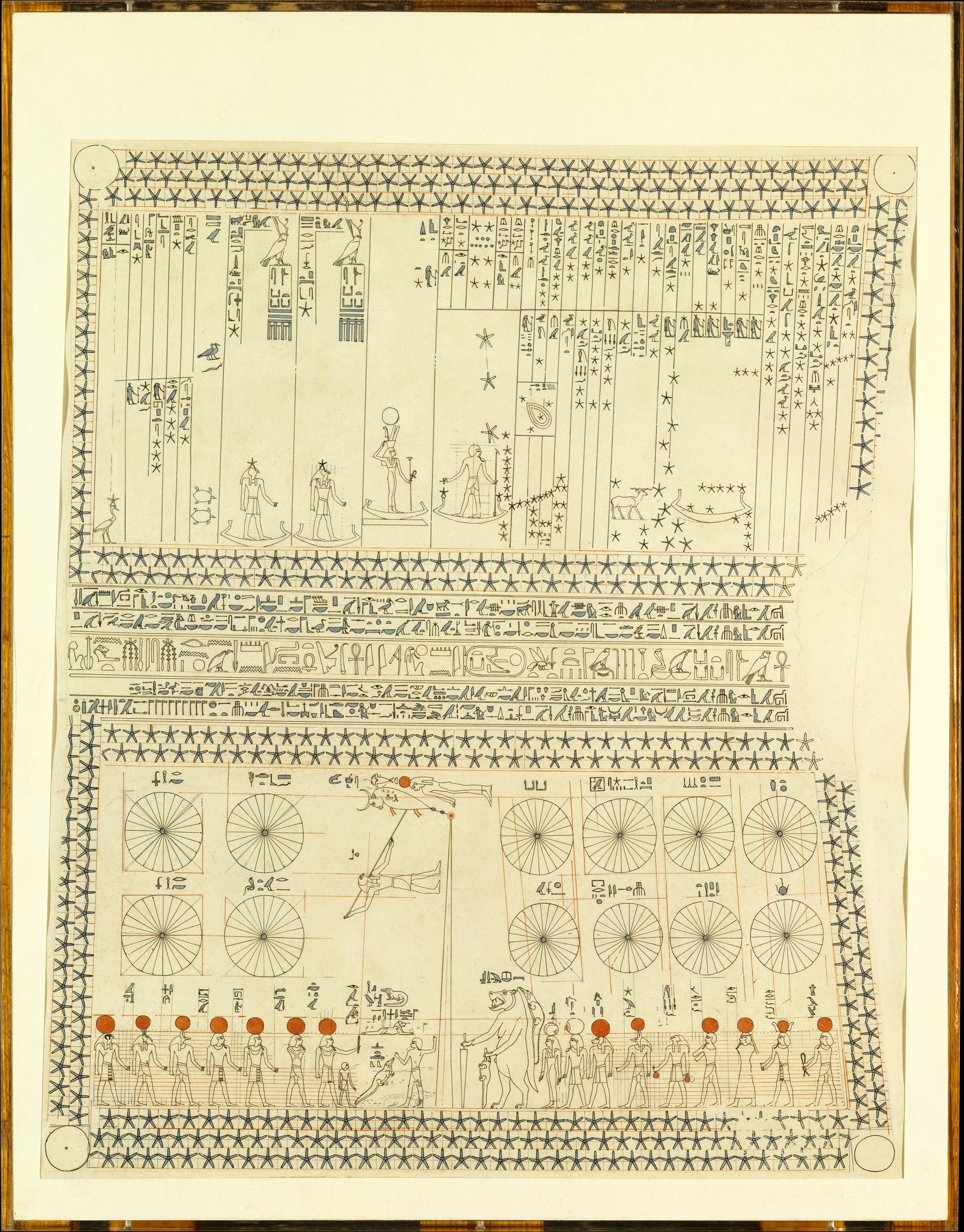
Astronomical ceiling of Senemut Tomb showing various decans (ancient Egyptian constellations), the XVIII Dynasty

Krupp pointed out that the slightly bent line formed by the three pyramids was deviated towards the north, whereas the slight "kink" in the line of Orion's Belt was deformed to the south, and to match them up one or the other of them had to be turned upside-down. Indeed, this is what was done in the original book by Bauval and Gilbert (The Orion Mystery), which compares images of the pyramids and Orion without revealing that the pyramids' map had been inverted. Krupp and Fairall found other problems with their arguments, including noting that if the Sphinx is meant to represent the constellation of Leo, then it should be on the opposite side of the Nile (the "Milky Way") from the pyramids ("Orion"), that the vernal equinox c. 10,500 BC was in Virgo and not Leo, and that in any case the constellations of the Zodiac originate from Mesopotamia and were completely unknown in Egypt until the much later Graeco-Roman era. Ed Krupp repeated this "upside down" statement in the BBC documentary Atlantis Reborn (1999).

== BBC documentary ==
On 4 November 1999, the BBC broadcast a documentary entitled Atlantis Reborn which tested the ideas of Robert Bauval and his colleague, Graham Hancock. Bauval and Hancock afterwards complained to the Broadcasting Standards Commission (BSC) that they had been treated unfairly.

A hearing followed and in November 2000 the BSC ruled in favour of the documentary makers on all but one of the ten principal complaints brought by Hancock and Bauval. The one complaint upheld regarded the omission of their rebuttal of a specific argument against the Orion Correlation Theory. In regard of the nine remaining principal complaints, the BSC ruled against Hancock and Bauval, concluding that they had not been treated unfairly in the criticism of their theories concerning carbon-dating, the Great Sphinx of Egypt, Cambodia's Angkor temples, Japan's Yonaguni formation and the mythical land of Atlantis.

The BBC offered to broadcast a revised version of the documentary, which was welcomed by Hancock and Bauval. It was broadcast as Atlantis Reborn Again on 14 December 2000. The revised documentary continued to present serious doubts about Bauval and Hancock's ideas, as held by astronomer Anthony Fairall, Ed Krupp of the Griffith Observatory, Egyptologist Kate Spence of Cambridge University and Eleanor Mannikka of the University of Michigan.

== Leo and the Sphinx ==
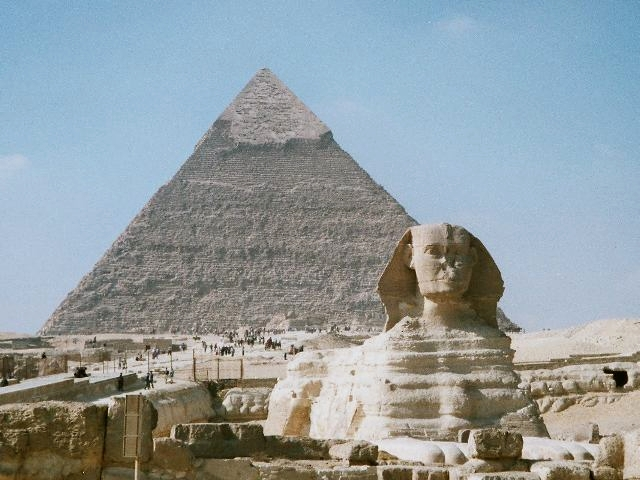
The Great Sphinx of Giza

The Great Sphinx of Giza is commonly accepted by Egyptologists to represent the likeness of King Khafre who is often credited as the builder as well. This would place the time of construction somewhere between 2520 BC and 2494 BC. Because the limited evidence giving provenance to Khafre is ambiguous, the idea of who built the Sphinx, and when, continues to be the subject of debate.

An argument put forward by Bauval and Hancock to support the Orion Correlation Theory is that the construction of the Great Sphinx was begun in 10,500 BC; that the Sphinx's lion-shape is a definitive reference to the constellation of Leo; and that the layout and orientation of the Sphinx, the Giza pyramid complex and the Nile River are an accurate reflection or "map" of the constellations of Leo, Orion (specifically, Orion's Belt) and the Milky Way, respectively.

A date of 10,500 BC is chosen because they maintain this is the only time in the precession of the equinoxes when the astrological age was Leo and when that constellation rose directly east of the Sphinx at the vernal equinox. They also suggest that in this epoch the angles between the three stars of Orion's Belt and the horizon were an "exact match" to the angles between the three main Giza pyramids. These propositions and other theories are used to support the overall belief in an advanced and ancient, but now vanished, global progenitor civilization.

The proposition that the Sphinx was constructed in 10,500 BC lacks support from geologists. While Robert M. Schoch's Sphinx water erosion hypothesis suggests an earlier carving date between 7000–5000 BC, this hypothesis is largely dismissed as pseudoscientific. Colin Reader has suggested a date only several hundred years prior to the commonly accepted date for construction. These views have been almost universally rejected by mainstream Egyptologists who, together with a number of geologists including James Harrell, Lal Gauri, John J. Sinai, and Jayanta K. Bandyopadhyay, stand by the conventional dating for the monument. Their analyses attribute the apparently accelerated wear on the Sphinx variously to modern industrial pollution, qualitative differences between the layers of limestone in the monument itself, scouring by wind-borne sand, or temperature changes causing the stone to crack.
