= List of Generator Rex episodes =

This is a list of episodes in the American animated television series Generator Rex.

== Series overview ==
Season	Episodes	Originally released	
Season	Episodes	First released	Last released
1	21	April 23, 2010	December 10, 2010
2	19	February 4, 2011	November 4, 2011
3	20 (2 unaired)	November 11, 2011	January 3, 2013
Ben Gen 10		April 10, 2021	

== Episodes ==
=== Season 1 (2010) ===
No. overall	No. in season	Title	Directed by	Written by	Original release date	Prod. code	Viewers (millions)
1	1	"The Day That Everything Changed"	Sam Montes	Man of Action	April 23, 2010	693–001	2.69
Five years ago, an unexplained accident results in the spread of billions of incomplete microscopic nanites into Earth's atmosphere. The nanites infect all living things and randomly activate, causing some organisms to mutate into Exponentially Variegated Organisms, or EVOs. In response to the Nanite Event, an international organization known as Providence is formed to contain the EVO threat. Rex, a 15-year-old boy, is an amnesiac EVO in Providence's custody who can control nanites, allowing him to both cure some E.V.O.s and manipulate his own nanites to form biomechanical weapons from his body. Under the supervision of Agent Six and Providence head scientist Dr. Rebecca Holiday, Rex deals with E.V.O.s around the world, curing as many as he can. Tiring of Providence's control over his life and poor treatment of him, Rex sneaks out of their headquarters with his EVO chimpanzee friend Bobo and meets Noah Nixon, an ordinary teenage boy whom he befriends. The two are then attacked by a group of E.V.O.s who pull them through a portal to Abysus, an E.V.O.-infested Eastern European country, where they meet Van Kleiss, the EVO leader of Abysus with the ability to manipulate its environment. Van Kleiss explains that Abysus was the epicenter of the Nanite Event, and heavily implies that he knows Rex and that he was involved with the events leading to the Nanite Event. Van Kleiss then attacks Rex, revealing that he feeds on fresh nanites. Rex escapes, and Agent Six arrives to rescue the group, with Van Kleiss seemingly being killed but later regenerating his body. Later, at the Providence HQ, Six and Holiday promise to treat Rex better and help him uncover his past, and Noah is revealed to be secretly working for Providence's leader, White Knight, to spy on Rex.
2	2	"String Theory"	Rick Morales	Man of Action	April 30, 2010	693–002	2.02
After Agent Six nearly kills a priest-turned-EVO whom Rex cures at the last moment, Rex becomes conflicted about Providence's ruthless "cure, contain, or kill" policy. Rex, Six, and Bobo are then sent to Manhattan, which has become infested by zombie-like E.V.O.s controlled by an EVO named Peter Meechum. Deeming the spread of Dr.Meechum's control too dangerous to contain, White Knight initiates Bleach Protocol, ordering for a nuclear weapon to be detonated on the Manhattan Bridge to kill Meechum and the infected. Refusing to let New York be destroyed, Rex learns that Meechum's daughter, Sarah, has been kidnapped by Van Kleiss and is being used as leverage to force Meechum to take over Manhattan. Meechum agrees to cooperate with Rex, and Rex cures him, along with the other infected individuals. Rex then rescues Sarah and reunites her with Meechum, who is placed under protective Providence custody.
3	3	"Beyond the Sea"	Chris Graham	Man of Action	May 7, 2010	693–003	1.69
Rex, Noah, and Bobo take a "vacation" to the resort island of Cabo Luna behind Providence's back, where Rex develops a crush on a mysterious girl named Circe. Hearing a strange noise at night, Rex encounters Circe under attack by a huge EVO sea monster. Helping her defeat it, Rex learns that Circe is herself an E.V.O. with the ability to summon other E.V.O.s with a sonic scream, and summoned the sea monster as part of an initiation ritual to join the Pack, the followers of Van Kleiss. Six arrives and helps Rex fight the Pack, but when Rex tries to convince Circe to leave the Pack and join Providence, she refuses, explaining that the Pack are the only ones who accept her for what she really is. Circe accompanies the Pack to Abysus, while Rex reluctantly returns to Providence to drown his sorrows in his work. In Abysus, Van Kleiss forgives Circe for her failure, as he intends to use her blooming romance with Rex to get to him.
4	4	"Lockdown"	Sam Montes	Scott Sonneborn	May 14, 2010	693–004	1.91
A spider-like EVO escapes special containment in Providence's headquarters, prompting Dr. Holiday to place the entire base on emergency lockdown. Rex and Noah, trapped inside of the Petting Zoo (Providence's containment zone for E.V.O.s), work together to evade the EVO until a panicked Noah inadvertently lets slip that he was hired by White Knight to spy on Rex. An outraged Rex loses access to his powers, and Noah is captured by the spider EVO. Rex and Holiday reach the center of the Zoo, where the EVO has captured a number of Providence agents and Noah and placed them in webbed cocoons. Holiday then reveals that the E.V.O. is her younger sister who, unfortunately, cannot be cured by Rex. Rex and Providence are able to subdue and recapture the EVO, and Rex makes amends with Noah. Rex threatens to hunt down White Knight if he ever tries to deceive him again, then flees Providence, while Six takes responsibility for revealing the truth about Noah.
5	5	"The Architect"	Rick Morales	Amy Wolfram	May 21, 2010	693–005	1.84
While running away from Providence, Rex encounters and aids a group of engineers under attack by EVOs. As thanks, the engineers lead Rex to their village, which is hidden from the world by a cloaking field. One of the engineers, Jacob, explains that the community consists of engineers who lost work after the Nanite Event, and are led by a man named the Architect who is building a tower capable of communicating with nanites on a global scale. While he grows fond of the community and their acceptance of him in contrast to Providence's coldness, Rex becomes suspicious of the Architect and investigates his tower, learning that he is in fact an android controlled by a malevolent artificial intelligence called Zag RS. Zag RS reveals that she intends to destroy all nanites, and all living things in the process, using the communications tower. Rex exposes the Architect's true nature to the townsfolk, and together, they are able to deactivate the tower and seemingly destroy Zag RS. Rex then returns to Providence, on the condition that he, Bobo, Six, and Holiday have meals together every Friday, like Jacob's family.
6	6	"Frostbite"	Chris Graham	Marty Isenberg	May 28, 2010	693–006	1.69
After absorbing too many nanites from an EVO and entering critical condition, Rex is taken to the remote Paradise Base in Antarctica for an emergency offload of his excess nanites. When Rex awakens from the procedure, he finds Six, Bobo, and Holiday missing, and encounters the Pack outside subduing them. In the base, Rex is betrayed by Providence scientist Weaver, who is revealed to have been supplying his nanites to Van Kleiss. Rex finds the others, and they confront Weaver and the Pack, with Weaver unleashing Rex's excess nanites to scare them off. In the process, Weaver is mutated into a massive EVO. Rex tries to cure him, instead finding himself communicating with the nanites inside of him and experiencing flashbacks of his past. Six defeats Weaver, and Rex is taken to Purgatory Base, located on a remote desert island in the South Pacific, to offload the remainder of his nanites. As Rex walks off to explore the island with Bobo, Six and Holiday privately discuss Rex's nature.
7	7	"Leader of the Pack"	Sam Montes	Alexx Van Dyne	June 4, 2010	693–007	1.34
Van Kleiss and the Pack arrive without warning at the Headquarters of the United Nations in New York City, where Rex is forbidden from attacking him due to Van Kleiss possessing diplomatic immunity as the leader of Abysus. Van Kleiss claims he has come to deliver a speech to the United Nations delegates on Abysus' behalf, but Providence remains suspicious of him. Rex is invited to a party by Van Kleiss, which he attends with Six, Bobo, and Holiday. At the party, Rex encounters his friend Circe in an underground passageway, where Breach, one of Van Kleiss's followers, is using her powers to teleport soil from Abysus to New York, thus granting Van Kleiss his full power. Van Kleiss takes the U.N. delegates hostage, but Rex is able to defeat him by blowing a hole in the underground passages and causing them to be flooded by the East River. Rex prepares to kill Van Kleiss, but Van Kleiss reminds him that he knows the identities of his parents, causing Rex to hesitate long enough for him to escape.
8	8	"Breach"	Chris Graham	Adam Beechen	June 11, 2010	693–009	1.69
Rex wakes up in a creepy boarding school in an empty town with no memory of how he got there. Contacting Dr. Holiday, Rex learns that he was attacked suddenly by Breach, who teleported him away to an unknown location using her power to create portals. Holiday, who has Breach in custody, demands that she reveal Rex's location. Rex, meanwhile, explores the abandoned town and learns that he is in Greenville, Ohio, which Holiday says disappeared without a trace two years prior; they conclude that Rex has been trapped in a pocket dimension created by Breach, who is keeping him there as her newest "doll". Realizing that the pocket dimension is a source of comfort and security for Breach, Rex is able to drive her to despair by wrecking all of her other "dolls" until she releases him and seemingly explodes. Later, Rex expresses sympathy for the loneliness that Breach must have felt and finds a new appreciation for what he has.
9	9	"Dark Passage"	Sam Montes	Marsha Griffin	June 18, 2010	693–010	1.37
Providence investigates a series of attacks on wealthy individuals carried out through mysterious boxes which temporarily mutate the victims into EVOs. They trace these boxes to Dr. Gabriel Rylander, a nanorobotics expert who went missing during the Nanite Event. Learning that Rylander had a son, Rex suspects that he may be his father, and accompanies Six, Holiday, and Bobo on a mission to South America to find Rylander. At Rylander's compound, they encounter Van Kleiss and the Pack, who are there in search of an allegedly limitless supply of nanites. Rex enters the compound and meets Rylander, who explains that he is not Rex's father, but rather the one who named him; Rex's family worked on the original Nanite Project which developed the nanites. After a near-fatal accident, Rex was infused with experimental nanites to save his life, which gave him his powers. The individuals Rylander attacked were the ones who initially commissioned the project, and were targeted as a warning as to the consequences of not finishing their work. Rylander reveals that Rex has a living brother, and injects Rex with an unknown nanite. Before Rylander can tell Rex the full truth about his past, however, he is stabbed by Van Kleiss. Rex and Van Kleiss battle until Rylander manages to push Van Kleiss into a nanite reactor, seemingly killing them both.
10	10	"The Forgotten"	Rick Morales	Paul Giacoppo	September 17, 2010	693–011	1.69
A team of Providence soldiers led by Captain Calan, carrying an important data rod, are attacked and crash in the Bug Jar - the quarantined ruins of Kyiv, Ukraine, which experienced a huge EVO outbreak shortly after the Nanite Event. The Bug Jar is protected by a huge one-way force field, which Rex is sent through to retrieve the data rod and the agents. In the Bug Jar, Rex encounters a faceless EVO nicknamed "NoFace", who wishes to use Providence's technology to escape from the Bug Jar. Rex and the agents are able to defeat NoFace and his swarms of EVOs, and escape from the Bug Jar with the data rod, which they present to White Knight.
11	11	"Operation: Wingman"	Chris Graham	Eugene Son	September 24, 2010	693–012	1.35
Rex finds himself constantly stalked and attacked by a rabbit EVO which escapes every time before he can capture it. Meanwhile, Rex is asked by Noah to be his wingman for a date with a girl named Claire Bowman, accompanying them to the junior prom as the date of Claire's friend Annie. During the date, Rex learns that Annie spreads unnaturally bad luck, and has critically injured all other boys who have tried to date her. During the prom date, Rex and his friends are attacked by the rabbit EVO, which they defeat together using a Providence mobile assault vehicle together with Annie's bad luck. They arrive at prom just as it is ending, but Claire admits that it was the most fun she ever had on a date, and Rex, while adamant that he will never date Annie again, admits that she is cute.
12	12	"Rabble"	Sam Montes	Rob Hoegee	October 1, 2010	693–013	1.42
While on a mission in Hong Kong, Rex encounters a group of teenage EVOs who recognize him. They reveal to Rex that prior to losing his memory, they were all close friends and lived together, with Rex acting as their leader. Rex then learns that his friends are serving EVO crime lord Quarry, who is forcing them to commit robberies on his behalf. Rex tries to free his friends from Quarry, but Quarry reveals that Rex, in the past, was the one who sold them out to him in the first place, and is thus responsible for what happened to them. Rex's friends, shocked and betrayed, decide to continue working for Quarry. Rex, not wishing for them to live that life, defeats Quarry and declares that he will not let his past define who he is now. Rex reconciles with his friends, and he lets them escape from Providence, telling White Knight they got away.
13	13	"The Hunter"	Rick Morales	Michael Ryan	October 8, 2010	693–008	1.32
While trying to stop an EVO attack in a neighborhood, Rex is suddenly confronted by Hunter Cain, a human vigilante who claims that EVOs are an incurable infectious disease, and Providence is betraying humanity by recruiting an EVO into their ranks. While Cain becomes increasingly popular and forms his own private anti-E.V.O. militia, Rex struggles with his feelings of rejection and hatred from the human community, ultimately deciding to stop his work to protect them. However, when a seemingly unstoppable swarm of ghost-like E.V.O.s attacks Providence, Rex decides to intervene. Cain attacks Rex, and reveals that he cloned the E.V.O.s as a "demonstration" of the futility of Providence. Rex defeats Cain and says that he doesn't care what others think of him, and will continue doing his job. Meanwhile, Providence and Cain's militia work together to defeat the ghost E.V.O.s, and the militiamen leave Cain after he abandoned them to the E.V.O.s
14	14	"Gravity"	Rick Morales	Andrew Robinson	October 15, 2010	693–014	1.68
Dr. Holiday and a group of Providence scientists perform an experiment onboard a space station in an attempt to develop an algorithm to cure EVOs, but the program only causes the nanites to self-destruct. Zag RS then takes over the station, intending to use the algorithm to destroy all nanites on Earth. With the scientists kept hostage on the station, Rex rendezvouses with them via a space elevator and aids Holiday in preventing Zag RS from acquiring the program. Zag RS seizes control of a robot and attempts to prevent Rex and Holiday from escaping the station as it hurtles toward Earth, but Rex and Holiday successfully escape as the station burns up in the atmosphere.
15	15	"What Lies Beneath"	Chris Graham	Marsha Griffin	October 22, 2010	693–015	1.61
Rex receives an unexpected phone call from Circe, who claims that there is a problem in Abysus. Rex, Six, Holiday, and Bobo travel to Abysus and find the landscape wasting away, and encounter Circe and the Pack, who explain that Van Kleiss's death has caused the unstable nanite-infused environment of Abysus to come undone. They claim that the only way to reverse the process is via a machine built by Van Kleiss, and Rex reluctantly agrees to help them after Dr. Holiday mentions the risks of allowing the corruption of Abysus to continue. However, Rex backs out after discovering that the machine is designed to resurrect Van Kleiss. The room then floods with nanite ink that begins to drown everyone, forcing Rex to activate the machine and bring back Van Kleiss, who refuses to save Rex's friends until he promises to join him. Rex agrees, and Van Kleiss releases the others. Rex reluctantly shakes Van Kleiss's hand, but realizing that Van Kleiss's new nanites have been altered, he successfully cures him. Van Kleiss and the Pack then escape via Breach, and Circe leaves after telling Rex that she cannot just abandon Van Kleiss for taking her in when no one else would, no matter how much she cares about Rex.
16	16	"The Swarm"	Sam Montes	Paul Giacoppo	October 29, 2010	693–016	1.11
A huge swarm of E.V.O. locusts spreads across western China in the direction of Beijing, threatening millions of lives. Providence attempts to stop the swarm using Bleach Protocol, but this only causes the locusts to multiply, enormously magnifying the threat. By analyzing some of the locusts' pheromones which were present on Rex's underwear, Dr. Holiday develops a chemical which causes the locusts to eat each other, destroying the swarm. Later, Rex's underwear ends up on international television and is credited for the whole solution of the threat, to Rex's humiliation.
17	17	"Basic"	Rick Morales	Scott Sonneborn	November 5, 2010	693–017	1.65
Rex and Noah challenge each other to attend Providence basic training, where they are quickly overwhelmed by the strict and physically taxing training discipline. Meanwhile, Providence cadet Kenwyn Jones becomes annoyed with Rex for bringing down her overall ranking in the academy. Kenwyn sabotages the restraint collars on the E.V.O.s used for combat training in hopes of evening the competition, but is then made to fight the EVOs, which break out of containment. The cadets, Rex, and Noah work together to stop the E.V.O.s., and Kenwyn apologizes to Rex. Rex and Noah are then kicked out of the academy.
18	18	"Plague"	Chris Graham	Tad Stones	November 12, 2010	693–018	1.67
An EVO virus breaks out across North America, causing all humans to fall into a deep sleep, while EVOs remain apparently immune. Rex, directed by Dr. Holiday (who has kept herself awake via neuroelectric shocks), is one of the only Providence agents still active, and is forced to deal with EVO threats across the continent and prevent anyone from getting hurt. After Dr. Holiday falls asleep as well, Rex is joined by White Knight himself in a massive battle suit, and the two close in on "Patient Zero", the source of the virus. When White Knight attempts to kill Patient Zero, he and Rex come at odds and then battle. White Knight reveals that he is the only pure human left on Earth, lacking any nanites in his body, and thus cannot turn into an EVO. Rex defeats Knight, but both are then attacked by a monster made of the virus. Rex is able to cure Patient Zero by entering the monster, and humanity is awoken from the virus. Rex later admits that he and Knight are similar, both being one-of-a-kind.
19	19	"Promises, Promises"	Sam Montes	Man of Action	November 19, 2010	693–019	1.67
On Rex's "birthday" (the anniversary of when he joined Providence), Agent Six reflects on the day he first met Rex. Years prior, Six and White Knight are partners working for Providence during its early days. During a battle against a gigantic mechanical EVO in Mexico, the EVO explodes and Six discovers a young Rex in its fist. After learning that Rex can cure E.V.O.s, Six secretly brings him to Providence and shows him to then-research assistant Dr. Holiday. White Knight, discovering Rex's nature, orders that he be dissected using a machine that magnetically strips nanites from a host body, killing the host. Six and Knight battle over Rex, whose haywire nanites start the machine early. While Knight is busy with Six, Dr. Holiday extracts the unconscious Rex from the room. As the airlocks of the machine close, Knight sees there is only enough time to save one of them, and hurls the unconscious Six out of the room, trapping himself. He is nearly killed until Rex regains consciousness, and deactivates it at the last moment. As a result, White Knight is stripped of all nanites but left alive, and is chosen to lead Providence as the only human on Earth who cannot turn into an EVO. White Knight reluctantly allows Rex to stay at Providence, but warns Six to kill Rex should he ever show signs of turning into the giant EVO again. In the present day, Six gifts Rex with a tantō, a ceremonial samurai blade, marked with a symbol of loyalty, stating that the two of them will follow the same path.
20	20	"Badlands"	Rick Morales	Eugene Son	December 3, 2010	693–021	1.52
A large Providence convoy commanded by Six is transporting a case of unstable nanites through a desert. Rex, Bobo, and Noah are assigned the humiliating task of transporting the force's toilet paper on a beaten-up truck. When Rex and the others are separated from the convoy, it is attacked by a group of criminals led by an eccentric self-proclaimed anarchist, Gatlocke. Gatlocke realizes that the convoy was actually transporting the toilet paper as a ruse, and Rex's truck is the one with the actual nanites. Gatlocke and Rex encounter each other and battle, all while Rex tries to keep the nanites from going above sea level, as Six warned that doing so would make them "go off". Rex defeats Gatlocke and gives the nanites to Six, who reveals that they have been deactivated.
21	21	"Payback"	Rick Morales	Rob Hoegee	December 10, 2010	693–020	1.60
Van Kleiss and the Pack orchestrate a massive coordinated attack on all major Providence facilities on Earth, with Van Kleiss himself targeting the Keep, the aerial flagship of Providence. Rex, Noah, and Bobo attempt to stop Van Kleiss from taking over the Keep, but Van Kleiss captures Rex, revealing that some of Rex's nanites were left behind when he cured him, giving him knowledge of Rex's abilities. Van Kleiss then steals all of Rex's active nanites, restoring his EVO abilities and leaving Rex powerless. Van Kleiss's lieutenant Biowulf throws Rex out of the Keep, but Rex is narrowly rescued by Holiday. Van Kleiss then discovers that Rex's nanites have given him the ability to turn living things into EVOs, and he proceeds to mutate all of the Keep's crew, including Captain Calan. At the Providence HQ, Holiday discovers that Rex still has one active nanite - the mysterious and infinitely powerful Omega-1 Nanite which Dr.Rylander injected him with some weeks ago. Van Kleiss then rams the Keep into Providence HQ, and his EVOs swarm it. In a desperate move, Rex travels to Purgatory Base and fills himself with deactivated nanites, hoping the Omega-1 will control them. Van Kleiss and his allies have defeated Agent Six and the rest of the agents, but Rex is able to defeat him with a new and much stronger and effective weapon the Omega-1 generated. Although Van Kleiss escapes, Rex is confident that he can defeat him next time.

=== Season 2 (2011) ===
No. overall	No. in season	Title	Directed by	Written by	Original release date	Prod. code	Viewers (millions)
22	1	"Rampage"	Rick Morales	Rob Hoegee	February 4, 2011	693–022	1.87
A ruined Providence HQ is under reconstruction, and Rex lives at Noah's house while attempting to generate new machines with the Omega-1 nanite. At a shipyard transporting supplies to the HQ, Van Kleiss and the Pack attack in an attempt to steal the new power core for the base. Rex, Six, Holiday, Bobo, and Noah intervene and defeat Van Kleiss, but Van Kleiss turns Noah into a huge dog-like E.V.O., who subsequently runs off in a destructive rampage. Rex chases Noah across the city to cure him before he is trapped in his EVO form forever. Rex successfully cures Noah, and the two corner Van Kleiss in a sewer, with Rex defeating him with a new machine. However, Van Kleiss reveals it was all a distraction so that Breach could steal the power core, and escapes.
23	2	"Waste Land"	Chris Graham	Tad Stones	February 11, 2011	693–023	1.70
A research ship is attacked by EVOs and sinks in the Great Pacific Garbage Patch vortex, prompting Rex and Six to investigate. They discover an enormous EVO coral reef constructed out of the trash, led by an EVO named Surge who claims that the humans have inflicted a curse upon them. Six reveals that the sunken research ship in fact contains a nuclear reactor, which will explode and destroy the entire coral reef if left unattended. Rex and Surge dive deep into an oceanic trench and deactivate the reactor just in time. In return for Surge's help, Rex and Six agree to keep the existence of his coral reef a secret from the rest of the world.
24	3	"Lost Weekend"	Seung-Hyun Oh	Scott Sonneborn	February 18, 2011	693–024	1.54
Rex and Bobo hear about a major party out in the Sonoran Desert, which White Knight sends them to investigate as the party features EVOs as the main entertainment. They are accompanied to the party by the recently-graduated Kenwyn Jones, who quickly comes at odds with Rex due to their different investigation styles. They eventually discover that someone is attacking and supercharging EVOs at the party, including Rex's Hong Kong friend Skwydd. Through their joint efforts, Rex and Kenwyn reveal the perpetrators as an E.V.O.-human pair who plan to destroy the entire party as a demonstration that humans and EVOs should not "mix". Rex, Bobo, and Kenwyn defeat the woman and the E.V.O., and Rex and Kenwyn admit that they would not mind working together in the future.
25	4	"Alliance"	Chris Graham	Paul Giacoppo	March 4, 2011	693–025	1.40
Rex is sent on an undercover mission to spy on Van Kleiss and the Pack, including his siren-like sweetheart Circe, who travel to the Bug Jar planning to strike a deal with its leader, NoFace. Rex deviates from the mission in an attempt to bring Circe back to his side; as the two battle, Circe reveals that Van Kleiss wants Rex alive and well, and that there is something about Rex's increasingly powerful new abilities that he still needs. Rex is captured by the Pack and brought before NoFace, who wishes to kill him in vengeance for his previous humiliation, which horrifies Circe, as she does not have his premature death on her conscience due to how much she cares about him. Van Kleiss intervenes when NoFace is about to kill him, causing the two to battle. In the ensuing chaos, Van Kleiss and the Pack escape, abandoning Circe, and Rex, Bobo, and Circe leave the Bug Jar. Circe realizes she has nowhere left to go back to, and Rex suggests she go to Hong Kong and live with Cricket, Skwydd and Tuck.
26	5	"Robo Bobo"	Seung-Hyun Oh	Man of Action	March 11, 2011	693–026	1.41
After stopping another Rabbit E.V.O., Rex begins to suspect something is wrong with Bobo when he begins acting unusually nice and even helping out around Providence. Six and Holiday brush off Rex's concerns, and Holiday reveals that prior to turning EVO, Bobo entertained sick children at hospitals. Rex, still suspicious, discovers that Bobo is in fact a robot, planted by the real Bobo as a ruse to allow him time away from Providence. Rex tries to teach Robo Bobo how to act like the "real" Bobo, but this only results in Robo Bobo causing chaos in the Petting Zoo. The real Bobo then returns and destroys Robo Bobo, convincing Six that the robot was created by an evil mastermind.
27	6	"Divide By Six"	Rick Morales	David Slack	March 18, 2011	693–027	N/A
Rex is kidnapped by a group of powerful humans led by Agent Six, who fly him to a remote island. Six reveals that his name comes from the fact that he is the sixth most dangerous man on the planet, and that the other four are the second (Dos), third (Trey), fourth (IV), and fifth (Five) most dangerous. Six explains that their leader, the most dangerous man on the planet or "One", has turned EVO and needs Rex to save him. Rex attempts to cure One but discovers that he is incurable, prompting the others to try and kill One. Six and Rex defend One, and Rex makes another attempt at curing him. One then uses Rex to communicate with Six, telling him he is proud of him, and dies peacefully. As Six and Rex return to Providence, Six admits that Rex is the one who made him change his mind about becoming the most dangerous man on Earth.
28	7	"Mixed Signals"	Chris Graham	Alexx Van Dyne	March 25, 2011	693–028	1.29
During a battle with a starfish-like EVO, Rex suddenly loses control of his powers and begins building strange, unidentified machines. At the Providence HQ, Rex assembles these machines into a large construct, which creates a force field which captures him. The HQ is then infiltrated by a mysterious man who releases Rex and reveals himself as Caesar Salazar, Rex's older brother. Caesar takes Rex away from Providence, and explains his past: Caesar, along with Rex's parents Rafael and Violetta, was one of the scientists who worked on the original Nanite Project. During the Nanite Event, their parents were killed, and Caesar was sent five years into the future, explaining his absence from Rex's life. Caesar takes Rex to Abysus, where they are attacked by Van Kleiss, who recognizes Caesar. Rex and Caesar escape, and Caesar helps Providence defeat the starfish EVO using his advanced scientific knowledge. Recognizing Caesar as a potentially valuable asset, White Knight hires him as a scientist, though Six remains distrusting of him.
29	8	"Outpost"	Seung-Hyun Oh	James Felder	April 1, 2011	693–029	N/A
White Knight sends Rex and Bobo to South America to deal with an alleged terrorist organization called the Green Fist, who are attacking Providence outposts and releasing their contained EVOs. Rex confronts the leader of the Green Fist, Valentina, who claims that they are a pro-EVO group who want EVOs to have freedom. Meanwhile, a powerful catlike EVO infects Rex and several Providence agents with a lethal toxin, which Holiday says can only be cured if Rex gets a sample of the E.V.O.'s DNA. Rex and Valentina work together to capture the EVO, which Rex discovers to his surprise is not an EVO at all, but rather a chupacabra, a rare exotic beast once considered to be fictional. Rex collects its DNA and Holiday synthesizes a cure, while Rex allows Valentina to escape.
30	9	"Haunted"	Rick Morales	Tad Stones	April 8, 2011	693–030	1.16
Noah attempts to win over Claire by taking her, Annie, and Rex to see a horror film, but this only results in both Claire and Annie clinging to Rex, to Noah's jealousy. Wanting to make it up to Noah, Rex and Caesar stage an elaborate hi-tech "haunted house" ruse in an abandoned hotel to frighten the girls. However, as they explore the hotel, Rex quickly discovers that the hotel actually is haunted by an invisible, cloud-like EVO cat. The EVO traps Noah and the claustrophobic Claire inside of an elevator, where Noah comforts her. Meanwhile, Rex and Annie defeat and cure the EVO, and Rex frees Noah and Claire. Claire and Noah almost kiss, but Caesar appears, and Claire and Annie ask him about his inventions, to Noah's frustration.
31	10	"Moonlighting"	Chris Graham	Scott Sonneborn	April 15, 2011	693–031	1.22
Rex learns that two former Providence agents, Rombauer and Lansky, are running a small-time business capturing EVOs in New York City. Rex ends up joining them, but the two become jealous when Rex begins to overshadow them and take some of their local fame. An EVO frog then attacks the city, encasing buildings in a purple crystal, but Rex, Rombauer, and Lansky work together with Providence to capture it and free the captured denizens of the city. Rex then leaves Rombauer and Lansky to their business.
32	11	"Without a Paddle"	Seung-Hyun Oh	Ken Pontac	April 22, 2011	693–032	1.52
Noah convinces Rex to enroll in his high school to compete in a table tennis tournament, as their rival school, East Side High, has a pair of powerful EVO twins on their team. Rex and Noah compete in the tournament until the championship match with the twins, where their father supercharges their nanites, causing them to go out of control. Rex is able to save the twins, who admit to their father that they want to play piano, which he accepts. Rex is then banned from the tournament and expelled from Noah's high school for the destruction caused to the gymnasium by the battle.
33	12	"Written in Sand"	Chris Graham	Man of Action	April 29, 2011	693–033	1.17
A mysterious nanite-free zone appears in the midst of a massive storm in the desert. Rex is sent to investigate, discovering that Van Kleiss and the Pack are also present. Rex and Van Kleiss are sucked underground and agree to put aside their differences temporarily to investigate the source of the zone, which Van Kleiss sees as a threat to his EVO existence. As they travel deeper, they realize that their nanites are being slowly destroyed, causing them both to waste away. As they both may perish, Van Kleiss convinces Rex to play a game of quid pro quo for each other's knowledge. Van Kleiss then claims that Caesar was the one responsible for the Nanite Event. A disbelieving and furious Rex accidentally activates a security system built into the rocks, and the two realize that the whole area is a circuit board. Rex deduces that the source is Zag-RS, who survived their previous encounter in space and is now attempting to destroy all nanites using the storm. Van Kleiss reveals that Rex's Omega-1 nanite can self-replicate, creating new nanites, and Rex uses this knowledge to fight back against Zag-RS until Van Kleiss deactivates her and vanishes. Zag-RS is taken into Providence custody, and Caesar reveals that he originally designed her to eliminate stray nanites, and that her voice is that of Rex's late Mexican mother, Violetta.
34	13	"Night Falls"	Rick Morales	Amy Wolfram	September 16, 2011	693–034	1.24
Rex and Caesar travel to a village in Mexico (the home country of their late mother Violetta) to see their honorary grandmother figure "Abuela" whom they used to visit frequently when Rex was young. Rex is reacquainted with his childhood friend Federico, and learns that the mayor of the town, Esteban, is trying to force Abuela to leave. Rex and Caesar then discover that Federico and various others in the village are E.V.O.s who assume werewolf-like forms at night. After Federico nearly attacks the village, Esteban hires Hunter Cain to attack Abuela and the E.V.O.s under her protection. Rex and Federico defeat Cain, and Caesar and Rex are able to give Federico and the others control over their transformations.
35	14	"Hard Target"	Seung-Hyun Oh	Paul Giacoppo	September 23, 2011	693–035	1.30
Breach travels to Hong Kong, China, as Van Kleiss has an important mission for her involving Quarry. Worried that she is after Circe, Rex follows her there, but is deeply uncomfortable to see Circe and Skwydd in a supposedly romantic relationship. Elsewhere, Breach springs Quarry out of prison to steal a rare and powerful weapon called a molecular destabilizer. Quarry and Rex fight, and Rex is able to defeat him by creating a new machine, a shield of super-energized atoms. Rex then bargains with Breach to release Circe from her pocket dimension, offering her Quarry to take the blame before Van Kleiss for the failure of her mission. Circe then assures Rex that she and Skwydd are just friends.
36	15	"A Family Holiday"	Rick Morales & John Fang	Man of Action	September 30, 2011	693–036	1.27
A scientist named Dr. Brandon Moses allegedly develops a cure for incurable EVOs, which greatly interests Dr. Holiday, who wishes to cure her sister Beverly. Holiday gives Beverly to Moses for him to cure her, but Rex, Six, and Bobo grow suspicious of him. They soon discover that his EVO cure is a ruse, and Moses is in fact collecting dangerous E.V.O.s to sell them to the highest bidder, using a device to supercharge their nanites. Rex and the others confront Moses, who supercharges Beverly, but Rex, Six, and Holiday are able to reverse the process with Moses's machine, which successfully cures Beverly. Realizing that Holiday is too old for him, Rex encourages Six to show his own romantic feelings for her.
37	16	"Exposed"	Chris Graham	Charlotte Fullerton	October 7, 2011	694–037	1.21
The news crew from Ultimate Exposure is given an inside look at the Providence HQ, where Rex continually tries to impress them and put on a show for the cameras. Things go awry when a group of EVOs escapes from containment, but Rex is able to defeat them. The Providence agents later watch the news broadcast, which turns out to be solely focused on Agent Six.
38	17	"Grounded"	Seung-Hyun Oh	James Felder	October 14, 2011	694–038	1.01
While nearly all Providence staff have left the headquarters for field training exercises, Noah convinces Rex to throw a party, but the only attendees are a group of rude teenagers who bullied Rex in "The Day That Everything Changed". Rex tries to entertain the teens all while keeping the party a secret from White Knight. Meanwhile, a catlike EVO and former member of the Pack escapes from containment and attacks Rex, but Rex is able to gain his allegiance when he realizes that he only wants revenge against Van Kleiss. The cat EVO then comes to work for Providence, while White Knight dumps Rex, Noah, and the teens in the sewer as punishment for their party.
39	18	"Six Minus Six"	Chris Graham	Alexx Van Dyne	October 21, 2011	694–039	N/A
Caesar attempts to use a machine to restore Rex's lost memories, but when it goes awry, Six intervenes and his memories of the past six years are accidentally erased. As a result, Six reverts to his personality as a ruthless, selfish mercenary. As Six resumes his prior mercenary work, Rex intervenes, trying to remind Six of the man he became. Six eventually comes around and agrees to return to Providence out of an interest in returning to who he once was.
40	19	"Lions and Lambs"	Seung-Hyun Oh	Rob Hoegee	November 4, 2011	694–040	N/A
During a battle against Rex, Breach uses a device on her chest to open a portal which releases a Tyrannosaurus rex. Realizing that Van Kleiss has found a way to use Breach's powers to travel through time, Rex decides to bring Breach to Providence's side, and sneaks into Abysus to convince her. Breach reluctantly flees Abysus with Rex, and the two spend time together, with Rex promising nobody at Providence will hurt her. Providence then suddenly arrives and attacks Breach, shortly followed by Van Kleiss, who deactivates Breach's powers. Rex confronts Van Kleiss and apologizes to Breach, demonstrating his trust in her by reactivating her powers. Breach suddenly decides to send Van Kleiss away, but the device goes out of control in doing so. Rex and Breach hug, and Rex is teleported six months into the future, where he discovers to his shock a radically changed Providence; Six and Holiday have left, and White Knight allegedly died after attempting a "hostile takeover". Caesar takes a confused Rex to White Knight's former office, where he is introduced to Providence's new leader, a mysterious woman who calls herself "Black Knight" who is very glad to have him back.

=== Season 3 (2011–13) ===
No. overall	No. in season	Title	Directed by	Written by	Original release date	Prod. code	Viewers (millions)
41	1	"Back in Black"	Seung-Hyun Oh	Paul Giacoppo	November 11, 2011	694–041	N/A
Rex learns from Black Knight that six months ago, following Rex's disappearance during the incident with Breach, White Knight became erratic and the "Directorate" lost faith in his ability to lead. White Knight then set off bombs in Rex's room, seemingly in an act of suicide. Black Knight attempts to win Rex's trust, showing him how the new Providence has adapted to Rex's absence by developing collars that influence the behaviors of E.V.Os. Rex distrusts Black Knight, and upon further investigation, discovers that the collars are in fact being used to control E.V.O.s against their will and that Caesar is aiding in their development. Rex destroys Caesar's machine and attempts to flee Providence, but is seemingly captured by two agents. However, the agents are revealed to be Six and Holiday, who have set up a counter-operation to Providence in their own secret base. White Knight is revealed to have staged his death, and the reunited team prepares for a secret war against New Providence.
42	2	"Crash and Burn"	Chris Graham	Eugene Son	November 18, 2011	694–042	N/A
Rex befriends a group of motorcycle racers who utilize performance-enhancing nanites which are negatively affecting them. Wishing to end the nanite enhancement trade, Rex tracks the nanites down to their source, a "biking guru" named Valve who challenges Rex to a race to determine the fate of the nanites. Meanwhile, Rex confides in Six that he is incapable of manifesting more than one machine at a time. Six deduces this as a mental block, and encourages Rex to overcome it. During the race, Rex is successfully able to manifest two machines, and defeats Valve.
43	3	"Ben 10 / Generator Rex: Heroes United"	Chris Graham and Kenji Ono	Man of Action	November 25, 2011	694–043	N/A
44	4	"Ben 10 / Generator Rex: Heroes United"	Chris Graham and Kenji Ono	Man of Action	November 25, 2011	694–044	N/A
A mysterious portal appears above Manhattan and releases sixteen-year-old Benjamin Kirby Tennyson (from Ben 10: Ultimate Alien) into Rex's reality as Humungosaur, whom Rex battles, thinking he is an E.V.O. Meanwhile, a mechanical entity escapes from the portal and attacks Six, placing him in a coma. Rex blames Ben for Six's injury and captures him, but Ben escapes, subsequently realizing that he is no longer in his own world. The two reluctantly agree to help each other just as Caesar arrives. Caesar reveals that the entity that escaped the portal is Alpha, a prototype nanite AI that he developed during the Nanite Project with the intent of enabling nanites to control themselves. When Alpha became self-aware and attempted to assimilate living things, Caesar developed a device to send it to an empty dimension where it would do no more harm. However, Ben recognizes that Caesar instead sent Alpha to the Null Void, a pocket dimension used as a prison for alien criminals, and was thus responsible for bringing Ben into Rex's universe. Alpha continues to grow in strength by assimilating more living things, until Rex, Ben, and White Knight confront it in the Bug Jar, where it has absorbed all of the resident EVOs. Alpha steals the Omega-1 nanite from Rex, but Ben and Rex work together to remove it, destroying Alpha. Alpha is imprisoned in a dense sphere which Ben brings to the Null Void. Six recovers from his coma, and Rex wonders if he will ever meet Ben again. Notes: This is 43 minutes longer than the usual 22, meaning this is a two-part episode. The events of the crossover specials take place during the third and final season of Ben 10: Ultimate Alien.
45	5	"Phantom of the Soap Opera"	Kenji Ono	Scott Sonneborn	December 9, 2011	694–045	N/A
Noah lands a job at a TV studio where Rex's favorite show, the Spanish soap opera El Amor De La Pasión El Amor, is filmed. Rex quickly tries to befriend the actors from the soap opera, and discovers that they have an EVO problem in the form of a mongoose. Rex learns that the mongoose was once the host of its own show, Mongo, which was canceled and replaced by El Amor De La Pasión El Amor. Rex is eventually able to cure the mongoose, but because Rex was wearing Noah's uniform, Noah is credited for saving the soap opera and gets to be in a scene where he kisses the lead actress, to Rex's jealousy.
46	6	"Riddle of the Sphinx"	Seung-Hyun Oh	James Felder	December 16, 2011	694–046	N/A
Rex, Six, and Bobo travel to Cairo, Egypt, where Dr. Holiday is investigating a recently uncovered ancient tomb containing hieroglyphs seemingly depicting nanites. Black Knight also discovers the tomb, wherein they encounter a mummified pharaoh, Gharun Set, who comes to life. Gharun Set reveals that he is an EVO and was taught English by "the Great Father". Gharun Set escapes from his tomb and reactivates a series of technologically advanced pyramids buried underground, which rise up across Cairo. Gharun Set also destroys the Great Sphinx of Giza, revealed to be a tomb for an enormous two-headed cat EVO which he restores to life. Beneath where the Sphinx once stood, Holiday and Black Knight discover the fabled Hall of Records, which contains modern-day nanite technology. Rex confronts Gharun Set as he attempts to take over Cairo, but discovers that his technology is far too old to function. The Sphinx dies, and Gharun Set laments that he lives in a "world of lies" which EVOs have no place in, and that the Great Father told him of Rex. Gharun Set then dies. Later, Black Knight destroys the Hall of Records, and is revealed to have recovered a hieroglyphic picture of Van Kleiss.
47	7	"Double Vision"	Chris Graham	Ken Pontac	December 30, 2011	694–047	N/A
After losing his goggles during a fight with a huge EVO plant, Rex believes his goggles are one of a kind and tries to retrieve them.
48	8	"Guy vs. Guy"	Seung-Hyun Oh	Jake Black	January 6, 2012	694–048	0.94
Rex plans a prank on Noah and asks Bobo for his help. However, things head downhill when one prank ends up endangering the entire city.
49	9	"Black and White"	Chris Graham	Man of Action	January 13, 2012	694–049	1.08
White Knight reveals intel that Providence is attempting to restart the Nanite Project, for unknown reasons. As a result, Rex and his allies stage an elaborate break-in of the Providence HQ to learn more, but Rex remains adamant that Caesar would never aid in the restoration of the Nanite Project. During the break-in, White Knight reaches his office and retrieves an item from beneath the floor, but Black Knight confronts him, and the two battle. Meanwhile, Rex detours from the plan to speak to Caesar. Caesar states that he is in fact in charge of the new Nanite Project, and is attempting to restore Dr. Gabriel Rylander to life in the same manner as Van Kleiss. Caesar then reveals that he had caused the Nanite Event in an alleged effort to "save the world", horrifying Rex and verifying what Van Kleiss had told him in "Written in Sand". Rex and the others escape from the Providence HQ, and White Knight reveals that the item he stole is a Meta-Nanite; one of several nanites containing a cipher which can control the very fabric of reality. The Consortium, the original finances of the Nanite Project, intended to put the Meta-Nanites inside of themselves to gain godlike powers. Rex realizes that this is the reason Caesar caused the Nanite Event; to scatter the Meta-Nanites across the globe and prevent the Consortium from gaining access to them. White Knight declares that the game has changed and that they must stop Black Knight before she recovers all five of the almighty Master-Control Nanites for herself and the Consortium.
50	10	"Deadzone"	Kenji Ono	Scott Sonneborn	January 20, 2012	694–050	1.09
While returning from a British geology convention they mistook for a rock festival, Rex and Noah encounter Fitzy Feakins, another human-looking E.V.O. able to nullify all E.V.O. abilities around him, rendering Rex completely powerless. Providence pursues the group aggressively to recover Fitzy, but Rex and Noah are able to defeat them, and find Fitzy a job working at a milkshake restaurant. When they fail to get Feakins, Black Knight says that she must get much more aggressive with Rex from now on.
51	11	"Assault on Abysus"	Seung-Hyun Oh	James Felder	January 27, 2012	694–051	0.97
After Providence captures Rex's friends in Hong Kong, Circe escapes and contacts Rex. White Knight reveals that Providence has targeted a second Meta-Nanite located in Van Kleiss' ruined castle in Abysus, and asks Circe to lead a mission to retrieve it. At Abysus, Rex and Circe encounter Biowulf, who has taken control in Van Kleiss' absence and reluctantly agrees to let them retrieve the Meta-Nanite just as Providence begins a massive siege on Abysus. Rex and the E.V.O.s are able to drive off Providence's agents, but Providence then lifts the entire castle from its foundations. Circe kisses Rex and pushes him off of the castle to safety just as she is captured by Providence, and Rex returns the Meta-Nanite to the Providence defectors.
52	12	"Remote Control"	Seung-Hyun Oh and John Fang	Ken Pontac	February 3, 2012	694–052	1.25
In Hong Kong, China, Rex learns that Quarry is using a remote control stolen from Providence Black Pawns that turns his childhood friends, Tuck, Skwydd, and Cricket against him once again. But things escalate for them all when Quarry returns.
53	13	"A Brief History of Time"	Chris Graham	Paul Giacoppo	February 10, 2012	694–053	1.12
Van Kleiss is revealed to have been sent back in time to the Old Kingdom of Egypt, where he created Gharun Set and the Sphinx, and engineered the technology in the Hall of Records as a means of returning himself to his own time. Van Kleiss is being pursued by a mysterious force, which he is convinced is an "antibody" of spacetime which is attempting to destroy him for being a violation of the laws of physics. Van Kleiss evades the force and places himself within what appears to be a time machine, awakening centuries later in the 2nd century AD, where he is captured by Roman soldiers. Van Kleiss is brought to the Colosseum in Ancient Rome, where he wins the favor of Emperor Septimius Severus, who worships him as a god. Van Kleiss is able to repair his machine and escapes once again as the entity pursues him, jumping across the eras in a desperate effort to make it home. In the present day, Rex tracks down Van Kleiss to Paris, learning that the device he built was not a time machine but a storage chamber which preserved only his nanites, meaning he was aware of every single second that passed. Rex frees Van Kleiss from the machine, and confronts the entity, revealed to have been Breach, who was pulled along with Van Kleiss during his trips through time due to the machine he attached to her. Rex destroys the machine and Breach vanishes, while Van Kleiss (who seems to have lost his mind from the experience) is captured by Providence. Black Knight appears before him and wonders if he knows who she is, to which Van Kleiss say that he does and that it has been a very long time.
54	14	"Mind Games"	Kenji Ono	Jonathan Callan	January 1, 2013 (Note: This episode was originally going to premiere on February 17, 2012, alongside "Hermanos.")	694–054	0.74
Rex saves Circe from Providence, but she is acting very strange, which makes Six suspicious. Rex later discovers that his "girlfriend" is actually a shapeshifting E.V.O. named John Scarecrow and former associate of Rex who has infiltrated the Plant on Black Knight's orders to try to get information on the two Master-Control Nanites the Providence Defect Group had obtained. This revelation leaves Rex quite concerned about the real Circe's whereabouts and condition. In her prison cell, the real Circe appears to see what is going on outside. The experience makes Rex wonder whether he and his closest family friends are truly united as a team.
55	15	"Hermanos"	John Fang	Scott Sonneborn	Unaired (Note: This episode was originally going to premiere on February 17, 2012, alongside "Mind Games.")	694–055	N/A
Rex learns that he has inherited a farm in Argentina - the home of his late father Rafael - and brings Noah Nixon, Claire Bowman, and clumsy Annie along to check it out. However, there is more to this family trip than meets the eye. Inside the Salazar farmhouse's underground laboratory, Rex finds a family videotape that showed him how his late Argentinean father Rafael had assured him, as a young boy, how nanites were going to change the world and that he and Cesar would be there to see it one day. The voice of his late Mexican mother, Violetta, is heard as she had been holding the video camera back then which she had wanted the teenage Cesar to hold for a while.
56	16	"Target: Consortium"	Chris Graham	Alexx Van Dyne	December 27, 2012 (Note: This episode was originally going to premiere on February 24, 2012.)	694–056	0.79
The Jungle Cat E.V.O. called "Nightshade" (from "Dark Passage" and "Grounded" about one year ago) returns from his petrified state and helps Rex and Agent Six attempt to find and take out Black Knight's five bosses in the Consortium who funded the Nanite Project in the hopes of becoming almighty gods. Rex is somehow capable of communing mentally with one of the Master-Control Nanites and discovers another at headquarters. upon seeing a partially resurrected incorporeal Dr. Rylander. Elated, Rex wonders if it could be done for their parents, Rafael and Violetta, but Cesar sadly says that it cannot be done. His elder brother assures him they are doing the right thing in "restarting the Nanite Project", but Rex no longer trusts Cesar's word. Dr. Rylander prompts Cesar to give Rex some crucial information, but he is not able to divulge such a secret as Black Knight shows up.
57	17	"Enemies Mine"	Kenji Ono	Eugene Son	Unaired (Note: This episode was originally going to premiere on March 2, 2012.)	694–057	N/A
Hunter Cain, Gatlocke, No Face, and Valve team up to take down Rex. Meanwhile, Rex ends up curing many E.V.Os that have escaped all over the world, furthering weakening and overflowing his system with nanites. Ultimately, it is revealed to have been able to keep Rex out of the way, as Black Knight recovered another of the long-lost four Meta Nanite. Rex states that now is the time to attack directly.
58	18	"Rock My World"	Kenji Ono	Alexx Van Dyne	December 26, 2012	694–058	0.84
Rex becomes a security guard of a band called the Trendbenders. He has to protect them from an obsessed fan named Sebastian, who was angry at the change in the band, as well as unbeknownst to Rex, has self-duplicating E.V.O. abilities. Dr. Holiday's cured younger sister Beverly returns for a fourth and final appearance.
59	19	"Endgame"	John Fang	Rob Hoegee	January 2, 2013	694–059	0.92
60	20	"Endgame"	Chris Graham	Rob Hoegee	January 3, 2013	694–060	1.05
Black Knight launches an assault on the Providence defectors' base to capture the remaining two Meta-Nanites. During a confrontation with Rex, Black Knight reveals that she herself is an E.V.O. with the same powers as him; she was a test subject during the Nanite Project, and was turned into an E.V.O. after Rex as an "improved version". Providence captures Rex and his team, but Van Kleiss reveals that Rex has the fifth and final Meta-Nanite inside of him, preventing Black Knight from killing him. Rex is transported to the laboratory in Abysus, where Caesar reveals that the only way to safely remove the fifth Meta-Nanite from Rex is to place him inside of the machine that will insert the other four Meta-Nanites into the Consortium. The Consortium and Rex enter the machine - along with Black Knight, who demands the position after threatening the Consortium - resulting in the Meta-Nanites being unexpectedly split between Black Knight and the Consortium members, transforming them into E.V.O.s with mighty reality-warping, elemental and teleporting powers. Angry at the flawed results of the experiment, the Consortium take out their anger on Rex, until Providence suddenly intervenes, with White Knight having returned as leader. Providence evacuates Rex, and they begin plans to fight back against the Consortium. The Consortium begin to sow chaos across the world, using their powers to pursue personal vendettas and greed. Faced with this threat, Six reveals to Rex the existence of his full bio-mechanical E.V.O. form, which may be powerful enough to stop the Consortium, but could also result in him losing his memories. After contemplating this, Rex finally confronts the Consortium, just as they are attempting to redo the experiment to gain the full power of the Meta-Nanites. Rex enters his full E.V.O. form but is defeated by the Consortium, but retains his memories. The Consortium restart the process, but Van Kleiss betrays them, revealing that he has retained his sanity and has always intended the power of the Meta-Nanites for himself; he strongly implies that he killed Rex's parents after they tried to stop him. Van Kleiss activates the process, but it fails, and his arm is destroyed. Caesar reveals that his late parents secretly programmed the Meta-Nanites to work only for Rex, preventing them from being used by anyone else. Rex absorbs the combined Meta-Nanite and becomes all-powerful. He spontaneously cures every E.V.O. on Earth, then permanently deactivates the Meta-Nanites, not wanting to abuse their power. In the aftermath, Providence continues its work to investigate and perfect nanites. Caesar, Gabriel Rylander, and Peter Meecham begin working together on a new project, and Rex is reunited with Circe and his friends, all of whom have returned to their human forms. Black Knight and the Consortium escape to an unknown location, while Breach takes Van Kleiss and the Pack away through her portals. The series concludes with Rex continuing his work for Providence to protect the Earth as the last and strongest E.V.O. on the planet.

^aThese episodes were released on Xbox Live, PlayStation Network, and iTunes.

=== Special (2021) ===
Title	Story by	Written and storyboarded by	Original air date (U.S.)	Prod. code	U.S. viewers (millions)
"Ben Gen 10"	A.J. Marchisello and Marcus Rinehart	Chelsea McAlarney, Johnny Vu, André LaMilza, John Martinez, Josh Kim, Sarah Visel, Benjamin P. Carow, and Kelly Turnbull	April 10, 2021	1095–409	0.24
"Ben Gen 10"	A.J. Marchisello and Marcus Rinehart	Chelsea McAlarney, Johnny Vu, André LaMilza, John Martinez, Josh Kim, Sarah Visel, Benjamin P. Carow, and Kelly Turnbull	April 10, 2021	1095–410	0.24
"Ben Gen 10"	A.J. Marchisello and Marcus Rinehart	Chelsea McAlarney, Johnny Vu, André LaMilza, John Martinez, Josh Kim, Sarah Visel, Benjamin P. Carow, and Kelly Turnbull	April 10, 2021	1095–411	0.24
"Ben Gen 10"	A.J. Marchisello and Marcus Rinehart	Chelsea McAlarney, Johnny Vu, André LaMilza, John Martinez, Josh Kim, Sarah Visel, Benjamin P. Carow, and Kelly Turnbull	April 10, 2021	1095–412H	0.24
A four-part special crossover with Ben 10 (2016–2021), ten-year-old Ben Tennyson meets a ten-year-old Rex, who is on the run with his sidekick monkey Bobo from a hostile Providence working through a series of misunderstandings to battle the magician Hex and save the world from being infected with alien/E.V.O. DNA. Guest star: Tara Strong as Ben Tennyson Note: The events of the crossover specials take place after the final episode of the series.
