= John Anthony West =

American author and amateur egyptologist

- Born: July 9, 1932; New York City, New York, U.S.
- Died: February 6, 2018 (aged 85)
- Known for: Sphinx water erosion hypothesis, studies of the Dogon people

John Anthony West (July 9, 1932 – February 6, 2018) was an American author and lecturer and a proponent of the Sphinx water erosion hypothesis. His early career was as a copywriter in Manhattan and science-fiction writer. He received a Hugo Award Honorable Mention in 1962. After recovering from cancer, West died from pneumonia at the age of 85.

== Sphinx hypothesis ==
In 1979, in his book Serpent in the Sky, he expanded on the ideas of French mystic and alternative Egyptologist Schwaller de Lubicz, suggesting the Great Sphinx of Giza had been eroded by Nile floods after being created 15,000-10,000 BC by Atlanteans. Ten years later, he teamed up with geologist Robert M. Schoch, seeking validation for his ideas. Schoch initially made the more conservative estimate of between 7,000 and 5,000 BC, but later pushed his minimum estimate back to 10,000 BC. This challenged the conventional dating of the carving of the statue to circa 2500 BC.

In 1993, the work of West and Schoch was presented by Charlton Heston in an NBC special called The Mystery of the Sphinx, which won a News & Documentary Emmy Award for Best Research and a nomination for Best Documentary.

== Criticism ==
Peter Green of the University of Texas at Austin has been critical of West. In a 1979 exchange of letters in the New York Review of Books, Green drew attention to what he considered to be numerous problems with West's work, including unconscious prejudices, "wildly speculative" ideas, and lack of scientific evidence, as well as a tendency towards conspiracy theories in lieu of orthodox Egyptology.

== Works ==
West's writing career spanned two periods. The first half lasted from 1961 to 1980 as a science-fiction short-story writer, and the second half was from 1980 to 2007 as a nonfiction book author. He won an Honorable Mention for Best Short Fiction towards the 1962 Hugo Award for his early short story "The Fiesta at Managuay" (1961).

=== Science fiction ===
Short stories

- "The Fiesta at Managuay" (1961);

first appearing in the collection book Call Out the Malicia, 1961 (UK);
then The Magazine of Fantasy and Science Fiction, December 1961 (US);
then The Magazine of Fantasy and Science Fiction, April 1962 (UK), Vol. 3, No. 5

- "George" (1961)
- "Gladys's Gregory" (1963), The Magazine of Fantasy and Science Fiction (US), February 1963, Vol. 24 #2, issue 141

- "A Case History" (1973)
- "The Fox and the Hedgehog" (1979)
- "The Emperor's New Clothes" (1980)

Novel

- Osborne's Army, Eyre & Spottiswoode (Publishers Limited), 1966; Penguin #2861, softcover, London, 1969.

=== Books ===
Call Out the Malicia is West's first published book and is a collection of his short stories.

Fiction

- Call Out the Malicia, Heinemann, London, UK, 1961 (book cover red eyes); E. P. Dutton, New York City, 1963 (book cover green eyes); both hardcover. A collection of 10 short stories of science fiction, fantasy, and horror.

Nonfiction

- John Anthony West and Jan Gerhard Toonder, The case for astrology, Quest Books, 1970
- Serpent in the Sky: The High Wisdom of Ancient Egypt, Quest Books, 1979
- The Traveler's Key to Ancient Egypt: A Guide to the Sacred Places of Ancient Egypt, Quest Books, 1996
- John Anthony West & Laird Scranton The Science of the Dogon: Decoding the African Mystery Tradition, Quest Books, 2006
- John Anthony West & Laird Scranton, Sacred Symbols of the Dogon: The Key to Advanced Science in the Ancient Egyptian Hieroglyphs, Quest Books, 2007
- David Solomon & John Anthony West (editor), The Dead Saints Chronicles: A Zen Journey Through the Christian Afterlife, Dead Saints Media, 2016

=== Video ===
- Ancient Egypt Mystery Schools, Unusual Accomplishment, LLC., 2015
- Magical Egypt: A Symbolist Tour of Ancient Egypt, 8 episodes, Cydonia Inc., 2001

== See also ==
- Graham Hancock
- Robert Bauval
- Robert K. G. Temple
