= The Mystery of the Sphinx =

- Genre: Documentary
- Based on: Serpent in the Sky by John Anthony West
- Written by: Bill Cote; Carol Cote; Boris Said; John Anthony West
- Directed by: Bill Cote
- Narrated by: Charlton Heston
- Composer: Fritz Heede

Production
- Producer: Robert Watts
- Cinematography: Sean Adair; Bill Cote
- Running time: 46 minutes
- Production companies: Magical Eye Inc. North Tower Films

Original release
- Network: NBC
- Release: 10 November 1993

The Mystery of the Sphinx is a 1993 television documentary about the Great Sphinx of Giza, with a central focus being the conflict of egyptologists against a number of modern geology and oftentimes fringe theory proponents of the Sphinx water erosion hypothesis. Charlton Heston is the host of the documentary, which features John Anthony West and geologist Robert M. Schoch.

== Release ==
=== Television ===
The documentary was first aired by NBC as an hour long prime time special on 10 November 1993. It reached an estimated audience of 33 million. It was subsequently shown repeatedly on TLC and the Discovery Channel over the next decade.

=== Home media ===
Mystery was initially released by Goldhil Home Media as a 95-minute "extended version" on VHS in 1994, and re-released on DVD by UFOTV as a 95-minute "Special Edition" in 2005.

== Reception ==
The VHS release was described in a 1994 review as "a fascinating combination of science and humbug."

Robert M. Schoch criticized the extended version of the documentary, saying "Unfortunately, the original documentary has since been re-edited and expanded with all sorts of extraneous material, some of which I am not at all happy about, and is currently being marketed by 'UFO TV'. It still contains the core material and is worth watching, but when you do so, please disregard the nonsense 'filler' that was inserted into an otherwise great show."

== Accolades ==
John Anthony West received a News & Documentary Emmy Award in the "Outstanding Individual Achievement in a Craft: Researchers" category for the program on 8 September 1994. The documentary also received a nomination in the "Special Classification for Outstanding News and Documentary Program Achievement" category.

== See also ==
- The Mysterious Origins of Man
