= Ahmed Osman (author) =

Egyptologist and essayist

- أحمد عثمان
- Born: 1934 (age 91–92); Egypt
- Occupation: Author

Ahmed Osman (Arabic: أحمد عثمان; born 1934) is an Egyptian-born author. He has put forward a number of theories, some revisionist in nature, about Ancient Egypt and the origins of Islam, Judaism and Christianity.

== Hypotheses ==
His first hypothesis was that Joseph was the father-in-law of Amenhotep III, Yuya. In 1987 this claim provided the basis for his first book, Stranger in the Valley of the Kings.

Osman identified the Semitic-born Egyptian official Joseph with the Egyptian official Yuya, and asserted the identification of Hebrew liberator Moses with the Egyptian pharaoh Akhenaten. In an article in The Jewish Quarterly Review Egyptologist Deborah Sweeney points out that to do this Osman "revamps the biblical text drastically", that he has used ideas about Egypt that have been shown to be wrong, and that Yuya's belief in multiple gods and his position as a priest of Min does not equate with Joseph's monotheism.

Ahmed Osman has also claimed that Moses and Akhenaten were the same person, supporting his belief by interpreting aspects of biblical and Egyptian history. He alleges that Atenism can be considered monotheistic and related to Judaism, and includes other similarities, including a ban on idol worship and the similarity of the name Aten to the Hebrew Adon, or "Lord". This would mesh with Osman's other claim that Akhenaten's maternal grandfather Yuya was the same person as the Biblical Joseph.

A number of Osman's positions are in conflict with mainstream Egyptology, including conventional Egyptian chronology. Some Egyptologists have gone as far as rejecting them as unacademic conjecture while others do not consider them worth refuting. Donald B. Redford wrote a scathing review of Stranger in the Valley of the Kings for Biblical Archaeology Review in which he wrote "The author treats the evidence as cavalierly as he pleases. He presents himself as a sober historian, yet when it suits him, the Biblical evidence is accepted at face value and literally... When the Biblical evidence does not suit Osman, it is discarded."

He also argues that Jesus was not Jewish but was actually the Egyptian Pharaoh Tutankhamun and that there was no Joshua, just a confusion between the names Jesus and Joshua: "Up to the 16th century, when the Old Testament books were translated from the Mesoretic Hebrew text into modern European languages, Jesus was the name of the prophet who succeeded Moses as leader of the Israelites in Egypt. Since the 16th century we started to have two names, Jesus and Joshua, which confused people into the belief that they were two different characters".

Osman states that the reason mainstream Egyptologists do not accept his ideas is because "Egyptologists have established their careers on their interpretations" and that to accept other theories could give them less authority.

== Works ==
- Stranger in the Valley of the Kings: Solving the Mystery of an Ancient Egyptian Mummy (1987) ISBN 0-06-250674-9

Alternate edition: Stranger in the Valley of the Kings: The Identification of Yuya as the Patriarch Joseph (1988)
Stranger in the Valley of the Kings (no subtitle) (1994) ISBN 0-586-08784-2
Alternate edition: Hebrew Pharaohs of Egypt: The Secret Lineage of the Patriarch Joseph (2001) ISBN 0-9540168-0-7 (2003) ISBN 1-59143-022-4

- Moses: Pharaoh of Egypt: The Mystery of Akhenaten Resolved (1990) ISBN 0-246-13665-0 (1994) ISBN 0-586-09034-7

Alternate edition: Moses and Akhenaten: The Secret History of Egypt at the Time of the Exodus (2002)

- The House of the Messiah: Controversial Revelations on the Historical Jesus (1992) ISBN 0-586-21685-5 ISBN 0246139064

Alternate edition: The House of the Messiah: A Brilliant New Solution to the Enduring Mystery of the Historical Jesus (1994)
Alternate edition: Jesus in the House of the Pharaohs: The Essene Revelations on the Historical Jesus (2004) ISBN 1-59143-027-5

- Out of Egypt: The Roots of Christianity Revealed (1999) ISBN 0-7126-7962-6
- Moses and Akhenaten: The Secret History of Egypt at the Time of the Exodus (2002) ISBN 1-59143-004-6
- Christianity: An Ancient Egyptian Religion (2005) ISBN 1-59143-046-1
- Christianity and Political Islam with Mounir Ghabbour (2010) ISBN 0-7043-7210-X
- Breaking the Mirror of Heaven: the Conspiracy to Suppress the Voice of Ancient Egypt with Robert Bauval (2012) ISBN 1591431565
