= Boston University College of General Studies =

Coordinates: 42.349°N 71.099°W

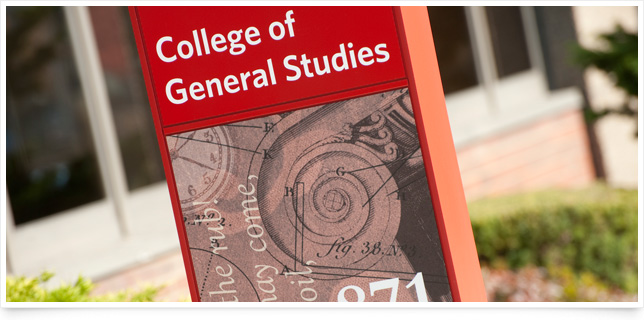
- The College of General Studies Sign
- Type: Private
- Established: 1952
- Dean: Natalie McKnight
- Undergraduates: Approx. 1200
- Location: Boston, Massachusetts, United States
- Campus: Urban
- Website: www.bu.edu/cgs

The College of General Studies (CGS) offers a two-year, general education core curriculum within Boston University. CGS is constructed in team system that limits the number of students in sections. The core curriculum is an interdisciplinary course of study taught by full-time Boston University faculty that all have attained PhD's. CGS freshmen are the second-largest incoming class of Boston University's ten undergraduate schools and colleges (next to the College of Arts and Sciences). All CGS freshmen are accepted as four-year bachelor's degree candidates, who, upon successful completion of the core curriculum and elective courses outside of CGS, continue to the Boston University's other nine undergraduate schools and colleges of their choice if they meet the requirements of that college.

The BU College of General Studies offers courses in the Humanities, Social Sciences, Rhetoric, and Natural Sciences to freshman and sophomore students as a way for students to fulfill all their general graduation requirements.

This college is a two-year commitment, a student is not allowed to transfer into another college within the university until after completing their sophomore year and all other prerequisites.

== Academics ==
Every student enrolled in the College of General Studies is a fully matriculated Boston University degree candidate who—upon completion of the two-year program will have earned 54 credits within the core curriculum and 8–12 elective credits in the other undergraduate programs of the University. Completion of these credit hours places a student approximately halfway through the 128-credit-hour requirement for nearly all of the University's baccalaureate degree programs. By the time CGS students move on to one of the other colleges at BU, they will have completed more or all of their requirements for graduation. After the two years, the student does not receive an associate degree, but will continue to pursue a bachelor's or other degree within Boston University.

For the Class of 2015, the credentials of the incoming class are as follows: Class Rank: Top 21% Average GPA: 3.3 (predominantly B+) SAT Composite: Middle 50%; 1710–1860 (avg. 1785) Critical Reading: Middle 50%; 550–620 (avg. 587) Math: Middle 50%; 560 – 630 (avg. 595) Writing: Middle 50%; 560–640 (avg. 603) SAT Subject Tests: Middle 50%; 520–630 (avg. 581) ACT: Middle 50%; 24–27 (avg. 26)

When approaching the end of CGS student's sophomore year, the students are required to complete a project known as Capstone. Capstone is a CGS tradition in which groups of students work together to research social problems and then argue in writing and orally for a specific policy proposal to solve the problem. All students will have completed all their CGS core courses prior to beginning Capstone.

The school also offers pathway sheets that assists students in choosing an elective course that will fulfill their possible major choice.

== Extracurricular Activities and Clubs ==
The College of General Studies offers several different locations in which a student can study or obtain assistance.

Marilyn and Jeffery Katzenberg Center A study lounge where students can study, read, and use the computers that are provided at the center.

The Katzenberg Center is located on the third floor of CGS and open Monday through Thursday 9 a.m.–5 p.m. and Friday 9 a.m.–4 p.m. The center is neither a research nor lending library, but rather a place for reading and quiet study. The Katzenberg Center has textbooks and books that are required for CGS courses. Faculty are able to put study guides and printed class material on reserve for students here as well.

Brendan F. Gilbane Study Lounge

Named after late CGS dean Brendan Gilbane (DGE'50, COM'52, GRS'59, '69) The Brendan F. Gilbane Study Lounge is an area for study and concentration during the day or weekday evenings. Located on the first floor of CGS, it has wireless Internet access, and small group meeting rooms.

Writing & Academic Support Center

CGS students can meet with faculty and academic specialists if they need help in their courses.

CGS Community Service Club

The CGS Community Service Club is a student-run club which allows students to make a difference and provide them volunteering opportunities.

== Study Abroad ==
CGS Study Abroad Programs in London

Boston University International Study Abroad Programs offers two summer programs for CGS students who have completed their freshman year: the London Natural Sciences Program and the London Humanities Program. Enrolling in these London summer programs gives students the option to take additional elective courses in the spring of the freshman year and the fall of the sophomore year.

The Summer London CGS Natural Sciences Program is designed to use the museums and historic sites in and around London to coincide with the learning done in the classroom. The two courses in this program will replace the fall natural science requirement (NS 201) and the spring natural science requirement (NS 202).

The London Humanities Program let's students explore the culture of London and learn about the humanities using the museums, parks, theaters, and famous homes of London.

These two courses will replace the humanities course required in the spring semester of the freshman year (HU 102) and the fall semester of the sophomore year (HU 201).

The College of General Studies also offers a fall London Program. This study abroad opportunity provides an opportunity for CGS students of sophomore status to study in London. Over the course of the 15-week program, students will take the CGS core curriculum (History of Western Ethics; Evolution and Biodiversity; Revolutions in China and Russia) along with one four-credit elective and a three-credit British culture course. Excursions to museums, theaters, and historical sites in surrounding towns and cities are also part of the curriculum.

== Notable Faculty or Alumni ==
- Robert M. Schoch
