= Robert M. Schoch =

American geologist

Robert Schoch
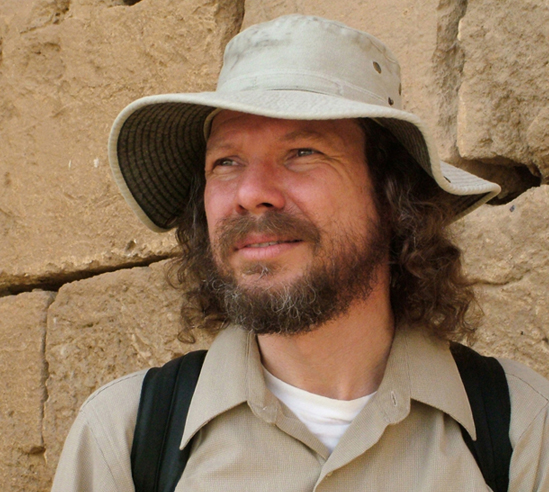
- Education: George Washington University (B.A. & B.S.); Yale University (M.S. & Ph.D.)
- Known for: Sphinx water erosion hypothesis
- Scientific career
- Thesis: Systematics, functional morphology and macroevolution of the extinct mammalian order Taeniodonta (1983)
- Website: robertschoch.com

Robert Milton Schoch is an American associate professor of Natural Sciences at the College of General Studies, Boston University. Following initial work as a vertebrate paleontologist, Schoch co-authored and expanded the fringe Sphinx water erosion hypothesis since 1990, and is the author of several pseudohistorical and pseudoscientific books.

== Education ==
Schoch received a BA in Anthropology and a BS in Geology from George Washington University in 1979. He was awarded MS and PhD degrees in Geology and Geophysics from Yale University (PhD, 1983). Schoch's PhD dissertation, Systematics, Functional Morphology and Macroevolution of the Extinct Mammalian Order Taeniodonta, was published in 1986 by the Peabody Museum of Natural History.

== Teaching ==
Schoch has taught at Boston University since 1984. He is an associate professor of Natural Sciences at the College of General Studies, a two-year core curriculum for bachelor's degree candidates. He teaches undergraduate science courses, including biology, geology, environmental science, geography, and science and public policy. He is a co-author of the college textbook Environmental Science: Systems and Solutions, now in its fifth edition.

In 1993 a genus of extinct mammals, Schochia, was named after him. This genus was renamed Robertschochia in 2011, but later recognised as a synonym of genus Wortmania.

== Works and views ==
From the 1980s to the 2000s, Schoch published research in vertebrate paleontology, primarily on fossil mammals from the Paleogene period, such as taeniodonts, brontotheres, pantodonts, dinoceratans and early rhinocerotoids. His works on the subject include the 2002 book Horns, Tusks, and Flippers: The Evolution of Hoofed Mammals which he coauthored with Donald Prothero.

Schoch is best known for his fringe argument that the Great Sphinx of Giza is much older than conventionally thought and that some kind of catastrophe was responsible for wiping out evidence of a significantly older, unknown civilization. In 1991, Schoch redated the monument to 10,000–5,000 BC, based on water erosion marks he identified on the Sphinx enclosure walls, and also based on findings from seismic studies around the base of the Sphinx and elsewhere on the plateau. The Sphinx water erosion hypothesis is rejected by the archaeological community because of evidence contradicting his conclusions. Mark Lehner looked at that the way several structures in the area incorporate elements from older structures, and based on the order in which they were constructed concludes that the archaeological sequencing does not allow for a date older than the reign of Khafra. Archaeologists and geologists have also challenged his geological claims.

Schoch's arguments were featured in the 1993 documentary The Mystery of the Sphinx, which was aired by NBC and presented by Charlton Heston. Schoch stars in the film alongside author John Anthony West.

Schoch also claims that possibly all pyramids — in Egypt, Mesoamerica and elsewhere — were the result of the destruction of an ancient protocivilization in Sundaland between 8000 and 6000 years ago by rising sea levels caused by repeated collisions with comets. In Voyages of the Pyramids Builders he suggests that when its inhabitants were forced out of Sundaland: "That movement, and its cultural legacies over the following millennia, provides the best explanation for the spread of pyramids across the globe." In 2006, at the invitation of locals, he investigated the so-called Bosnian pyramid excavations north of Sarajevo, but he concluded that the site held "absolutely no evidence of pyramids per se or of a great ancient civilization in the Visoko region".

He is also known for his writing on the Yonaguni underwater monuments, where he has dived on several occasions, beginning in 1997. His conclusion from analyzing the formations is that this is a natural site possibly modified by humans to suit their needs: "We should also consider the possibility that the Yonaguni Monument is fundamentally a natural structure that was utilized, enhanced, and modified by humans in ancient times."

Schoch contributed an essay to Lost Secrets of the Gods, a pseudoarchaeology book which argues for the existence of ancient astronauts. He has appeared on Coast to Coast AM.

Another of his interests is the study of parapsychology. He has stated that psychokinesis and telepathy are potentially real.

== Response from other academics ==
Mark Lehner, an American archaeologist and egyptologist, has disputed Schoch's analysis, stating, "You don't overthrow Egyptian history based on one phenomenon like a weathering profile... that is how pseudoscience is done, not real science."

Historian Ronald H. Fritze has described Schoch as a "pseudohistorical and pseudoscientific writer".

== Published works ==
- Phylogeny Reconstruction in Paleontology, 1986. ISBN 0-442-27967-1.
- Systematics, Functional Morphology and Macroevolution of the Extinct Mammalian Order Taeniodonta , 1986. ISBN 0-912532-04-1
- Stratigraphy: Principles and Methods, 1989. ISBN 0-442-28021-1.
- Case Studies in Environmental Science, 1996. ISBN 0-314-20397-4.
- Voices of the Rocks: A Scientist Looks at Catastrophes and Ancient Civilizations, 1999. ISBN 0-609-60369-8.
- Horns, Tusks, and Flippers: The Evolution of Hoofed Mammals, with Donald R. Prothero, 2003. ISBN 0-8018-7135-2.
- Voyages of the Pyramid Builders: The True Origins of the Pyramids from Lost Egypt to Ancient America, 2003. ISBN 1-58542-320-3.
- Environmental Science: Systems and Solutions, with Michael L. McKinney, 2003. ISBN 0-7637-0918-2.
- Pyramid Quest: Secrets of the Great Pyramid and the Dawn of Civilization, TarcherPerigee, 2005. ISBN 1-58542-405-6.
- Environmental Science: Systems and Solutions, with Michael L. McKinney, Logan Yonavjak, 2007. ISBN 0-7637-4262-7.
- Environmental Science, with Andrew H. Lapinski, Anne Tweed, 2007. ISBN 0-13-069900-4.
- The Parapsychology Revolution: A Concise Anthology of Paranormal and Psychical Research, 2008. ISBN 1-58542-616-4.
- Forgotten Civilization, The Role of Solar Outbursts in Our Past and Future, 2012, ISBN 978-1-59477-497-3;(Revised and expanded edition, 2021. ISBN 978-1-64411-292-2.)
- Origins of the Sphinx: Celestial Guardian of Pre-Pharaonic Civilization, with Robert Bauval, 2017 ISBN 978-1-62055-526-2

== See also ==
- Hydrostatics
