= Anthony Patrick Fairall =

South African astronomer

Anthony Patrick (Tony) Fairall (September 15, 1943 – November 22, 2008) was a South African astronomer most noted for his work on exploring the large-scale structure of the Universe, such as filaments and voids. He was the director of what is now the Iziko planetarium in Cape Town and was a well-known popularizer of astronomy in South Africa.

Fairall was born in London and moved with his family to Johannesburg, South Africa, in 1948 and then Harare, Zimbabwe in 1953. He studied at the University of Cape Town, completing his undergraduate degree in 1966. He studied for his doctorate under Gerard de Vaucouleurs and Fritz Zwicky at the University of Texas at Austin, receiving his degree in 1970.

Fairall discovered and named Fairall 9, the most luminous Seyfert 1 (active) galaxy.

== Books ==
- Fairall, A. P. (1998). Large Scale Structures in the Universe. ASIN B01K0Q41Z8.
- Fairall, A. P. (2000). Cosmology Revealed: Living Inside the Cosmic Egg. Springer. ISBN 978-1852333225.
- Fairall, A. P. (2003). Starwatching. Struik Publishers. ISBN 978-1868727384.
