= Sphinx water erosion hypothesis =

Fringe theory on the age of the Great Sphinx of Giza

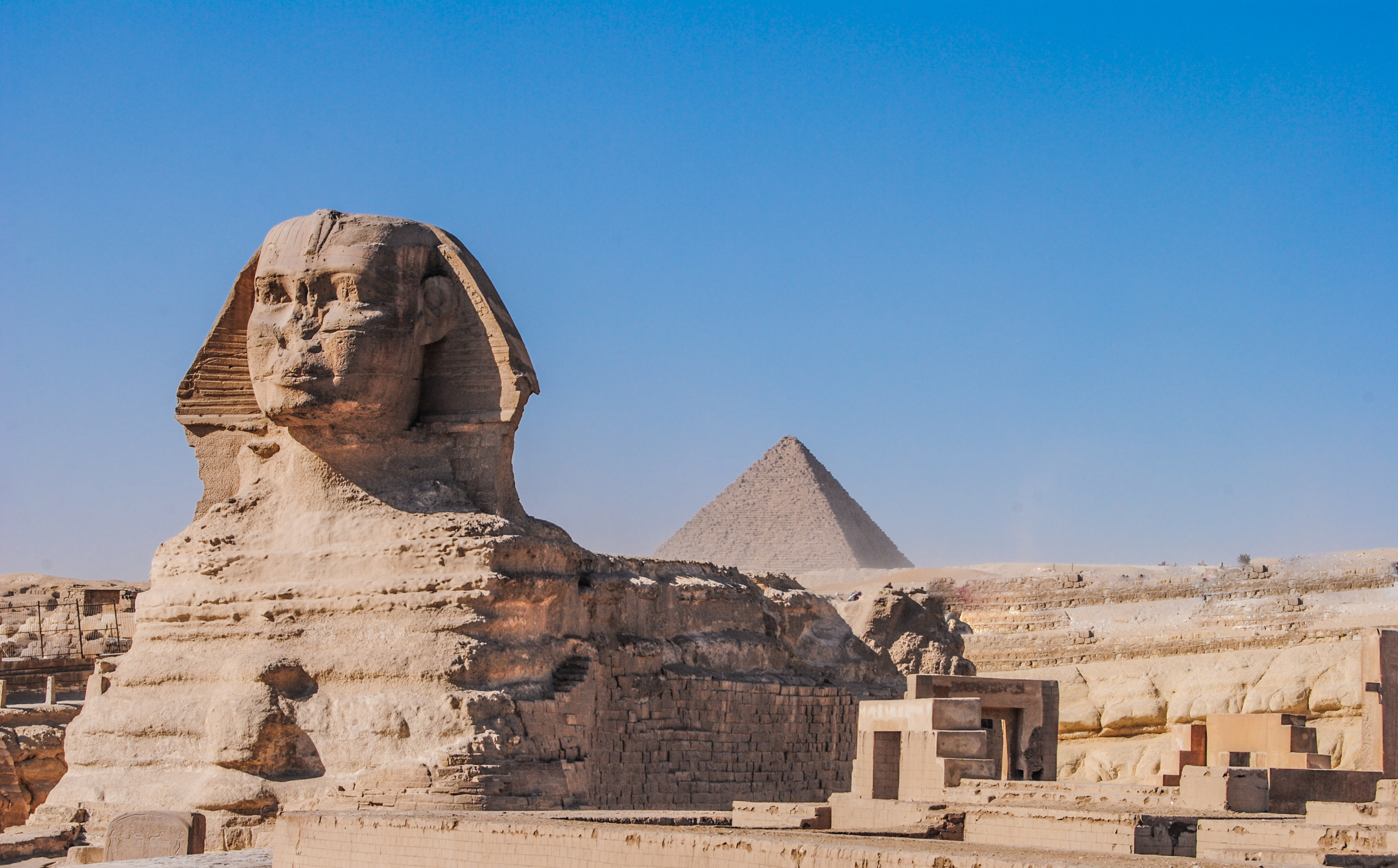
The Great Sphinx of Giza

The Sphinx water erosion hypothesis is a fringe claim, contending that the Great Sphinx of Giza and its enclosing walls show erosion consistent with precipitation. Its proponents believe this dates the construction of the Sphinx to Predynastic Egypt or earlier. The hypothesis is inspired by the myth of Atlantis and it contradicts the mainstream view that the Sphinx was constructed contemporaneously with the Giza pyramid complex. Major proponents of the hypothesis include alternative Egyptologist John Anthony West, and geologist Robert Schoch.

Most archeologists and egyptologists have rejected the idea of an earlier construction of the Sphinx, instead attributing it to pharaoh Khafre. Those critical of the hypothesis draw attention to problems with Schoch and West's methodology, point out that the Sphinx enclosure fits into the overall layout of the Giza complex, and cite geological evidence that limestone from the Sphinx enclosure was used in the construction of nearby buildings. The hypothesis has also faced scrutiny from geologists who attribute the erosion to Nile flooding and occasional heavy rains that persisted into the Dynastic period.

== History ==
Readings by Edgar Cayce said that Atlantis was destroyed around 10,500 BC and that Atlantean refugees brought civilization to Egypt, constructing the Great Pyramid of Giza and the sphinx within the century or so that followed. In the 1950s, French mystic and alternative Egyptologist Schwaller de Lubicz speculated the body of the Sphinx to be eroded by deluges and that therefore the Sphinx must predate them, further claiming that ancient Egyptian knowledge originated from colonists or refugees of Plato's sunken continent of Atlantis.

In 1979, author and alternative Egyptologist John Anthony West, inspired by Schwaller's ideas, attributed the erosion to Nile floods between 15,000 and 10,000 BC. By denying the existence of any evidence for the development of Egyptian civilization prior to the first dynasty, West created room to inject the idea of a lost, advanced civilization of Atlanteans who created the Sphinx and passed on their knowledge to the dynastic Egyptians.

Ten years later, West sought the opinion of geologist Robert Schoch to validate his claims. In 1990 they traveled together to Egypt, visiting the Sphinx. The following year Schoch formulated and presented his version of the hypothesis, purposely avoiding the use of the word "Atlantis". He originally estimated the Sphinx to have been created before 5000 BC, later pushing his minimum estimate further back to 9700 BC, once again aligning it with Plato's lost civilization of Atlantis.

== Dating the Sphinx ==
Sphinx and Sphinx Temple (right), Khafre Valley Temple with causeway running past the Sphinx (left)

=== Archaeological context ===
The Sphinx is positioned north of the lower end of the causeway of Khafre that connects his Pyramid- and Valley Temple. It was created by carving it out of the bedrock, cutting blocks from around its body which were used to construct the Sphinx Temple immediately east of the Sphinx and north of the Valley Temple, aligned to it.

Evidence suggests that both the Sphinx and its temple were created only after Khafre's Valley Temple and causeway:

- The Sphinx Temple was built on the foundation of the preexisting northern enclosure wall of the Valley Temple. This wall was entirely removed apart from a small portion, which was incorporated into the Sphinx Temple.
- Unlike the Valley Temple, both the Sphinx enclosure and the Sphinx Temple remained unfinished. The north and east walls of the enclosure are cut back unevenly and insufficiently. The Sphinx Temple lacks in height and work to fit casing blocks was only partially completed. Lehner suggests that a Sphinx cult wasn't established when work ceased prematurely, hence the relative lack of cultural material from the Old Kingdom.

Peter Lacovara, an Egyptologist and curator at the Michael C. Carlos Museum, assigns "some of the erosional features" on the enclosure walls to quarrying activities rather than weathering.

==== Causeway ====
The causeway connecting Khafre's Pyramid and Valley Temple is not oriented to the cardinal directions but runs slanted. The southern wall of the Sphinx enclosure respects this orientation.

==== Sphinx Temple and Khafre Valley Temple ====
Luminescence dating of the two temples gave dates for the middle to late third millennium BC, concurring with the chronological estimates for Khafre and the 4th dynasty and the radiocarbon dates for the pyramids of Giza. Some samples indicated New Kingdom intrusions into the temples. As such, the Dream Stele between the paws of the Sphinx might have been originally a door lintel of Khafre's valley or pyramid temple.

Several hieroglyphic inscriptions were found on the walls of the Khafre temples. as well as several statues of Khafre or fragments thereof.

Schoch argues that the casing was applied long after the core structure was built, stating that "granite facing [of the Sphinx and Valley Temple] is covering deeply weathered limestone [that was] slightly cut back and smoothed out [but not enough] to make the wall perfectly smooth". Lehner responded that the limestone wasn't deeply weathered, but that it was cut back irregularly to fit the harder granite facade to it, pointing to the Menkaure Pyramid Temple where the technique can be clearly seen.

==== Missing archaeological evidence for an earlier civilization ====
Mark Lehner when asked about the possibility of an earlier civilization replied, "Well, it's not impossible, but it has a very, very low level of probability, that there was an older civilization there." Other archaeologists who have made similar criticisms include Kenneth Feder. Feder wrote:

there is no evidence whatsoever for a culture capable of building the Great Sphinx much before the traditionally accepted date. A large and impressive monument like the Great Sphinx cannot have built itself; there must have been a social and practical infrastructure in place to accomplish that task. In other words, only a culture with a pattern of social stratification and the capability to enlist the labor of a large pool of workers would have been capable of building the Great Sphinx, and for the period predating 2500 bce, there is no evidence at all of such a culture—no complex settlements with substantial populations, no social hierarchy reflected in inequality in housing or burials. There is no sign at all of an infrastructure necessary to support a large population of workers, no sign of the ability to produce a large agricultural surplus to feed the construction workers, no evidence of dormitories for housing them, no huge storage facilities for food, no great bakeries, no cemeteries in which to bury the workers who would have died during the construction project.

=== Erosion ===
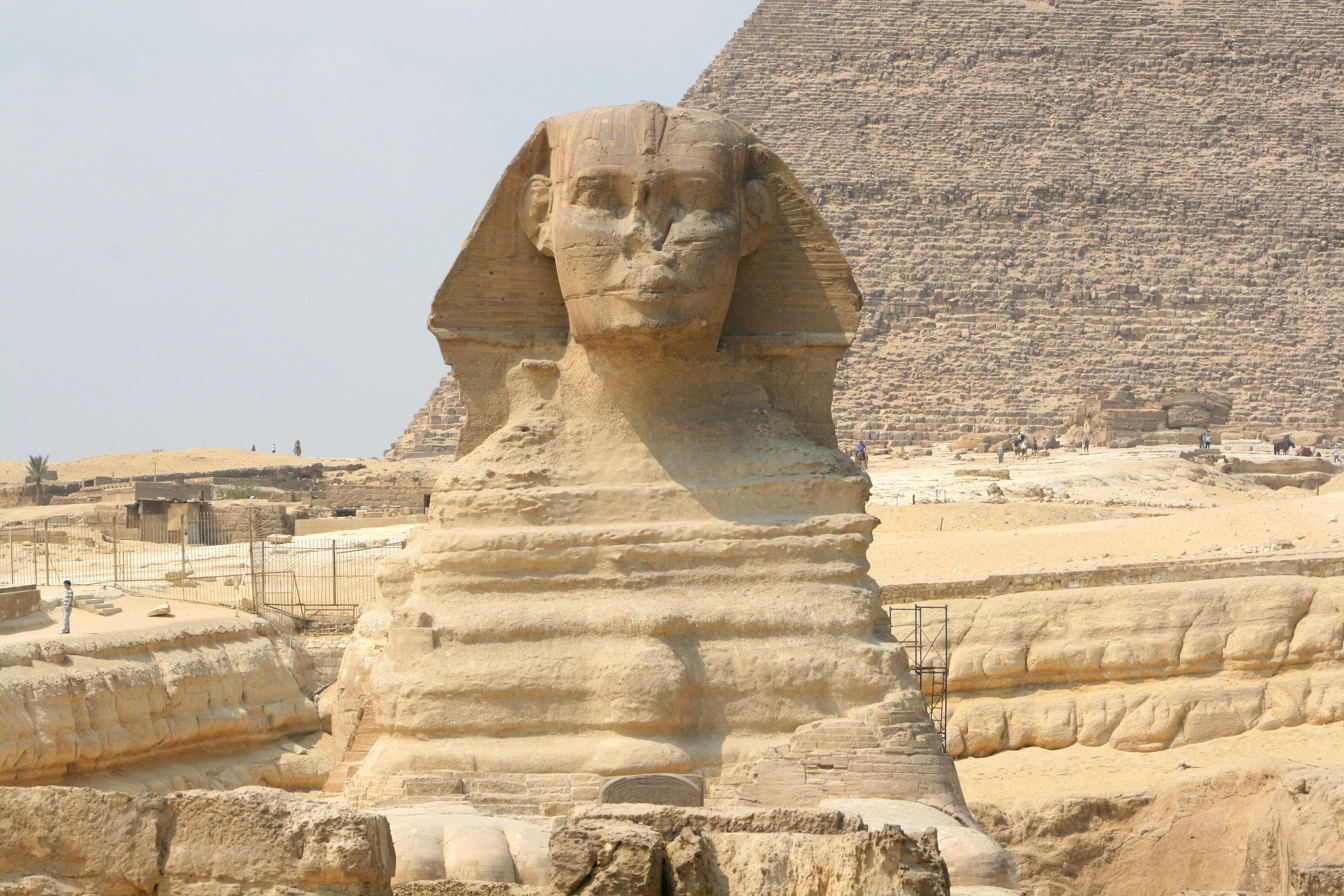
Erosion on the front body of the Sphinx and the enclosure behind. Weathering on the head and neck was repaired in the 1920s.

==== Pre-Sphinx erosion ====
Schoch argues that the Giza Plateau is "criss crossed with fractures or joints millions of years old" and that "fissures such as those on the Sphinx enclosure wall can only be produced by water, primarily precipitation, and do bear on the age of the Sphinx."

Geoscientist Jørn Christiansen agrees that at least some of the erosion took place before the Sphinx was carved. Stating that water most likely seeped through natural fissures in the limestone before the Sphinx had been carved, causing the walls of the Sphinx enclosure to look like they were carved much earlier than they really were. As such, Christiansen determined that there was no geological evidence to suggest the Sphinx was carved earlier than any other monuments on the Giza plateau.

Hawass points to the poor quality of much of the Giza limestone as the basis for the significant erosion levels.

==== Water erosion ====
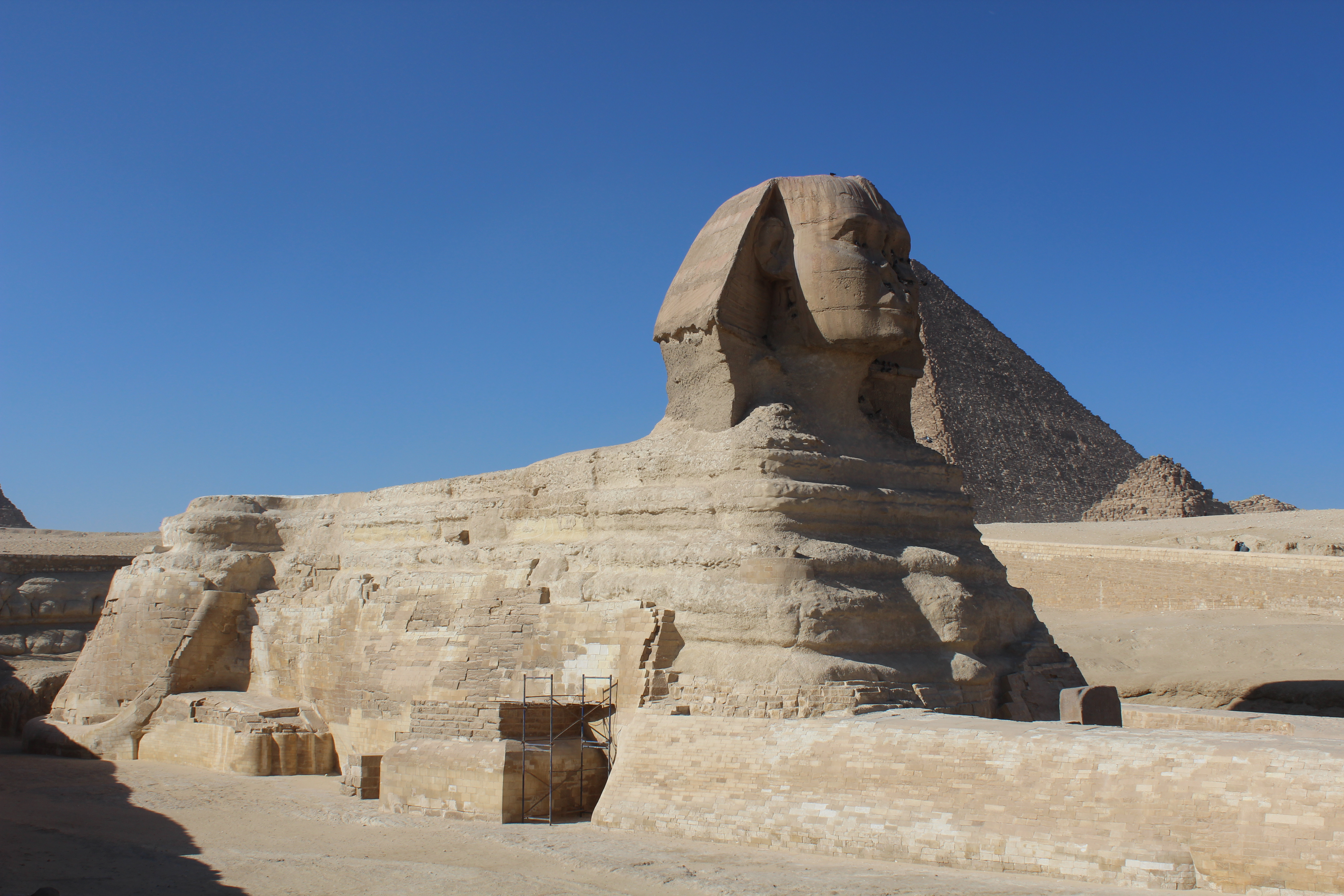
Vertical weathering on the body of the Sphinx

After an investigation of the enclosure's geology, Schoch concluded that the most prominent weathering pattern was caused by prolonged and extensive rainfall, pointing to the well-developed undulating vertical profile on the enclosure walls. Further stating that "many of the vertical and inclined solution features follow [preexisting] joints and faults in the bedrock", referencing the absence of such features on other rock surfaces in the Giza pyramid complex. Other geologists, such as Gauri, disagreed and argued for different erosion forces or a combination of such.

Schoch contends that because the last period of significant rainfall seemingly ended between the late fourth and early 3rd millennium BC, the Sphinx's construction must date to 5000 BC or earlier, However, new geoarchaeological evidence suggests the occurrence of heavy rainfalls until the end of the Old Kingdom, circa 2200 BC. Hawass criticizes that Schoch "never demonstrates why the rainfall over the last 4,500 years would not be sufficient to round off the corners", pointing to the many downpours at Giza over the past decades.

A recent study by Rudolph Kuper and Stefan Kröpelin, of the University of Cologne suggest the change from a wet to an arid climate in the Sahara happened gradually with climate changes taking place on a north-to-south gradient. According to this study, arid conditions began in the Egyptian Sahara by 5300 BC. These desert conditions gradually extended to the south with Northern Sudan experiencing an arid climate circa 1500 BC. Egyptologist Mark Lehner believes this climate change may have been responsible for the severe weathering found on the Sphinx and other sites of the 4th Dynasty. After studying sediment samples in the Nile Valley, Judith Bunbury, a geologist at the University of Cambridge, concluded that climate change in the Giza region may have begun early in the Old Kingdom, with desert sands arriving in force late in the era.

Recently, Schoch pushed back his minimum estimate 5000 years further back, to around the end of the last ice age.

==== Haloclasty ====
Due to the Sphinx lying closely above the Nile aquifer, capillary action moves groundwater to the surface of the stone. During this process salt contained in the limestone is dissolved and drawn to the surface where it crystallises. The expanding crystals cause fine layers of surface limestone to flake off. It is accepted by Schoch et al. that this mechanism is evident in many places on the Giza Plateau. One proponent of the haloclasty process is Dr James A. Harrell of the University of Toledo, who advocates that the deep erosion crevices were caused by the haloclasty process being driven by moisture in the sand that covered the carved rock for much of the time since it was exposed by quarrying. Lal Gauri et al. also favour the haloclasty process to explain the erosion features, but have theorised that the weathering was driven by moisture deriving from atmospheric precipitation such as dew.

Analysis of the Sphinx's bedrock by the Getty Conservation Institute (1990–1992) concluded that "Continual salt crystallization, which has a destructive effect on the stone, would explain at least some of the deterioration of the Sphinx."

Haloclasty is rejected as an explanation for the vertical erosion features by Schoch because it does not explain all the visible evidence, namely that the water erosion features are not evenly distributed, being concentrated in those areas that would have been particularly exposed to running water, whereas the haloclasty process should have operated evenly on all exposed limestone surfaces.

==== Wind erosion ====
Schoch states that wind erosion forms distinctive horizontal bands, whereas the water erosion features are clearly vertical.

==== Comparisons to other structures ====
Hawass stated that from the present-day rapid rate of erosion on the Member II surface of the Sphinx, that "[t]he eleven hundred years between Khafre and the first major restoration in the Eighteenth Dynasty, or even half this time, would have been more than enough to erode the Member II into the deep recesses behind Phase I restoration masonry".

Schoch and West argued that other structures and surfaces on the Giza Plateau are made from the same band of limestone as the Sphinx enclosure, but do not show the same erosion as the walls of the Sphinx enclosure and that unspecified early dynastic mudbrick mastabas at Saqqara (close to Giza) have survived relatively undamaged, which lead them to conclude that no heavy rainfall has occurred in the region since the Early Dynastic Period.

Reader replied to this, stating that these structures "were built on an area of high ground and do not lie within any natural catchment. These tombs will not, therefore, have been exposed to any significant run-off." He concludes that "the fact that they are not significantly degraded, as Schoch has pointed out, demonstrates that rainfall itself has not been a significant agent of degradation in Egypt." Rainfall water run-off, however, has been a more significant factor. Reader cites evidence of flood water damage in another location to illustrate this.

Lehner responded that these tombs were protected from erosion by sand and debris for most of their history, asking Schoch and West to clarify which mastabas they were referring to exactly.

=== Head size ===
Various authors, like Schoch and Temple, have asserted that the head of the Sphinx is too small for its body, concluding it was recarved. Lehner argued that the head is primarily too small in relation to the length of the body, suggesting that without elongating the body the builders wouldn't have been able to complete the latter part of the Sphinx, due to a large natural fissure that cuts through the bedrock.
