= Herbert Pagani =

Italian artist and musician

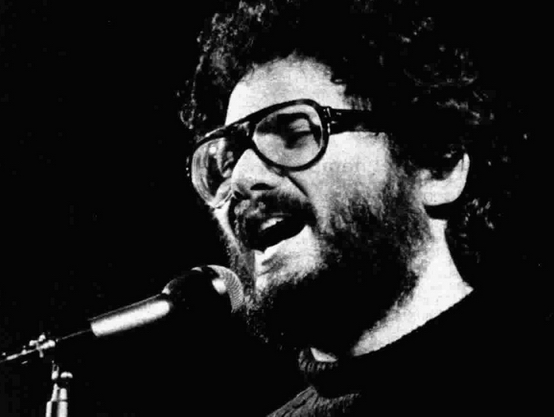
- A picture of Herbert Pagani

Background information
- Born: Herbert Avreham Haggiag Pagani; 25 April 1944; Tripoli, British Libya
- Died: 16 August 1988 (aged 44) Palm Springs, California, United States
- Genres: Pop
- Occupation: Singer-songwriter
- Instrument: Vocals
- Labels: Jolly; RCA; Carosello; Ri-Fi

Herbert Avraham Haggiag Pagani (25 April 1944 – 16 August 1988) was an Italian artist and musician.

== Biography ==
Pagani was born in a Jewish family in Libya, just around the time when the country stopped being an Italian Colonial Administration. He spent his childhood and adolescence between Italy, Germany and France. This nonstop wandering about different cultures drove him to seek out a personal language that would enable him to express himself non-verbally, and he started drawing.

In 1964, Pagani, at the age of twenty, had his first exhibition at the Pierre Picard Gallery in Cannes, where he exhibited a group of Indian-ink drawings and engravings. The French poet Jean Rousselot wrote an enthusiastic review in Planete, describing Pagani as a "Twenty-years-old Visionary". Among his first Italian collectors were Giorgio Soavi, Federico Fellini, Bernardino Zapponi and the Olivetti Collection. Shortly afterwards, he was invited to contribute a series of drawings for the Planète Review edited by Jacques Bergier and Louis Pauwels, becoming one of the youngest exponents of the Fantastic Realism. In 1965, Pagani illustrated books such as Giuseppe Berto's Fantarca (Rizzoli) and Aldous Huxley's Brave New World (Club des Amis du Livre).

Parallel to art, Pagani pursued an interest in music. His first Italian album was released in 1967. About two years later, the day after Colonel Muammar Gaddafi's 1969 Libyan coup d'état, the police broke into Pagani's family's house in Tripoli. A hundred and fifty canvases and drawings were destroyed. His first French album, chronicling those events, was released in 1970. Pagani designed the covers of his records, and the stage designs of his shows.

In 1971, Pagani had a solo exhibition at the Théâtre de la Ville in Paris called Concerto d'Italie where he did a performance inside his drawings projected on a large screen by Laser Graphics Group. This was the first Diaporama exhibition staged in Europe. Pagani was interested in investigating the correlation among all the techniques he was to try out. Already in 1965 he had declared that "Engraving on stone, or vinyl, is the same thing. It is more important to establish one' s mental and emotional territory with all available means".

In 1973 Pagani used documentary footage made available by RAI to produce and direct a 27-minute movie-pamphlet entitled Venise, amore mio which Unesco defined as "the best vehicle of information on the dangers besetting Venice and its lagoon". The film was later broadcast on Antenne 2 twice.

In 1975, Pagani composed the music and designed the stage set for Megalopolis, a total opera based on Medioevo Prossimo Venturo (The near future middle ages) with a libretto by Italian futurologist Roberto Vacca. Megalopolis was selected by the French Ministry of Culture for the re-opening of the Palais de Chaillot at the Trocadero. It was subsequently staged at Festival dei Due Mondi in Spoleto. In 1976 it received the Grand Prize of the Academy Charles Cros.

In 1975, Pagani composed the soundtrack for the Italian TV series Marco Visconti. The opening theme, "Cavalli Ricamati", was a moderate success in the Italian charts.

In 1977, Pagani experimented with abstraction, mostly with video synthesisers devised by the French electronics engineer Marcel Dupouy. Despite his keen interest in technology, Pagani never refrained from using paper, pencils, paints and brushes. Influenced by the Italian art movement Arte povera, he started working with discarded materials he would collect from beaches and in dumps across Europe. His sculptures, mostly made of old shoes, were exhibited at Centro Internazionale di Brera, Milan and Palazzo dei Diamanti in Ferrara.

Pagani died of leukaemia, aged 44 in Palm Springs. He is buried in the Kiryat Shaul Cemetery in Tel Aviv. A commemorative plate celebrating his life is permanently installed in Portofino, on a path leading to his house.

== Bibliography ==
- Arturo Schwartz, Herbert Pagani: la scrittura della vita, Macef, Milan, 1991.
- Paolo Levi, Aldo Spirito, Philippe Fresco, Herbert Pagani: Opere 1963–1986, Spazio Skema, Rome, 1986.

== Discography ==
- 1967: Una sera con Herbert Pagani (Private Pressing)
- 1969: Amicizia (Mama, RPLP-001)
- 1973: Megalopolis (Mama, RPLP-002)
- 1975: Ballate dal Marco Visconti (RCA, TPL1-1155)
- 1976: Palcoscenico (RCA, TPL-1-1225)
