= Dendera light =

Motif in the Hathor temple in Egypt

Coordinates: 26.1419°N 32.6702°E

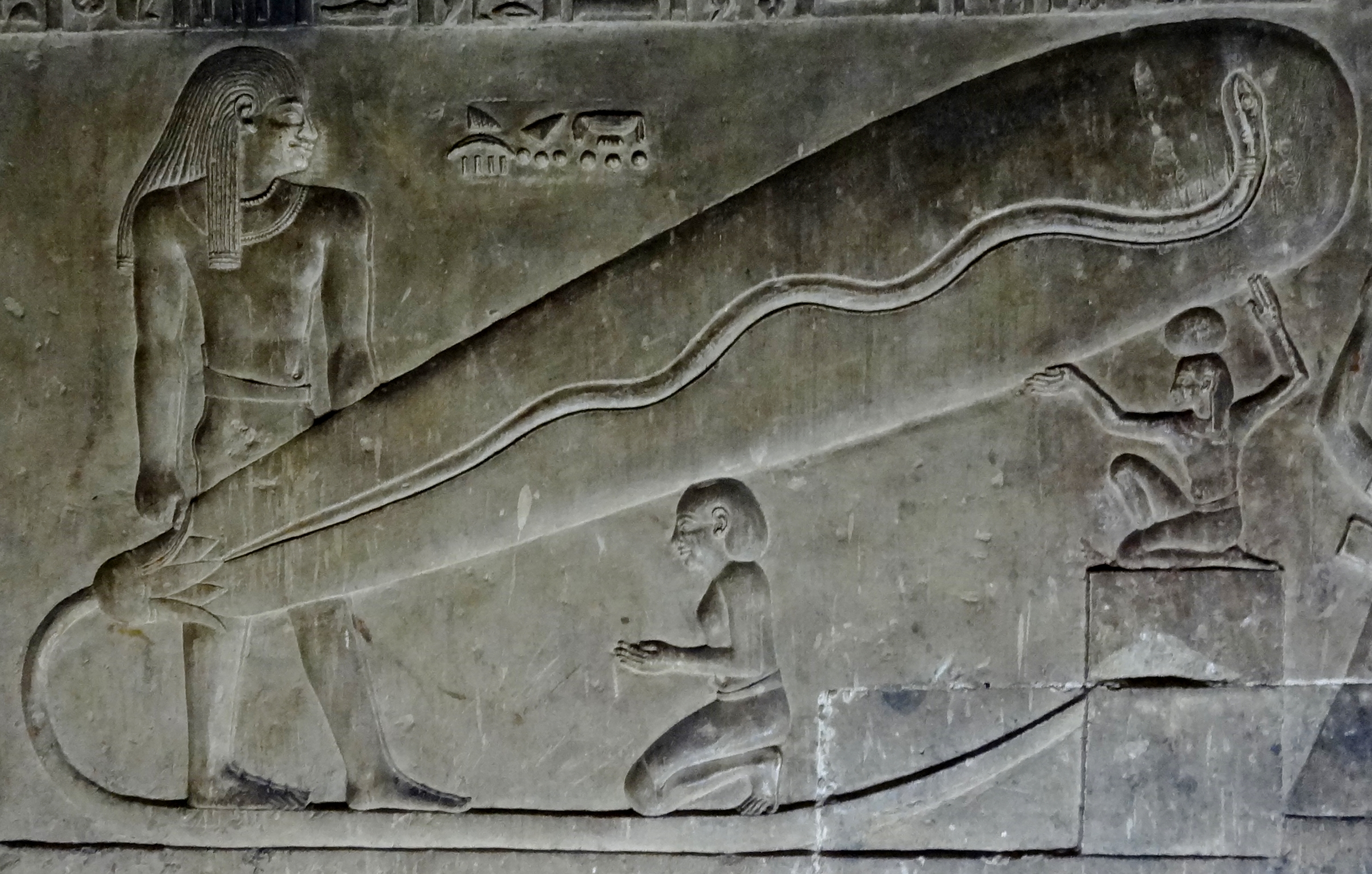
- Object 1a, one of six depictions of Harsomtus surrounded by the womb of Nut, at Dendera

The so-called "Dendera light" is a motif in the Hathor temple at Dendera in Egypt. According to the hieroglyphic text surrounding the pieces, it depicts statues referencing part of an Egyptian creation myth.

The temple, especially its crypts, contain several reliefs depicting statues of Harsomtus, sometimes syncretized with Ra, in the form of an upright snake, emerging from a lotus flower which is usually attached to a barge. The so-called Dendera light is a variation of this motif, showing Harsomtus in an oval container called hn, which might represent the womb of Nut. Sometimes a djed pillar supports the snake or the container, other times a man with raised arms and a sun disk on his head.

The crypt of the temple was considered analogous to the Duat, and reliefs in the crypts depict the cult statues (made of precious materials and thus looted or destroyed in later times) which were housed within, kept underground as the 'bodies' of the gods until they were resurrected through contact with light on the roof of the temple. Specifications of the size and construction of the statues are inscribed alongside captions describing the identity of the statue.

== Depictions and text ==
Each of the three objects consists of two reliefs. One half (a) of each pair is in south crypt 1-C (crypte 4), the other half (b) in room G (chambre V) of the temple.

=== Object 1a – crypt 1-C, south wall ===
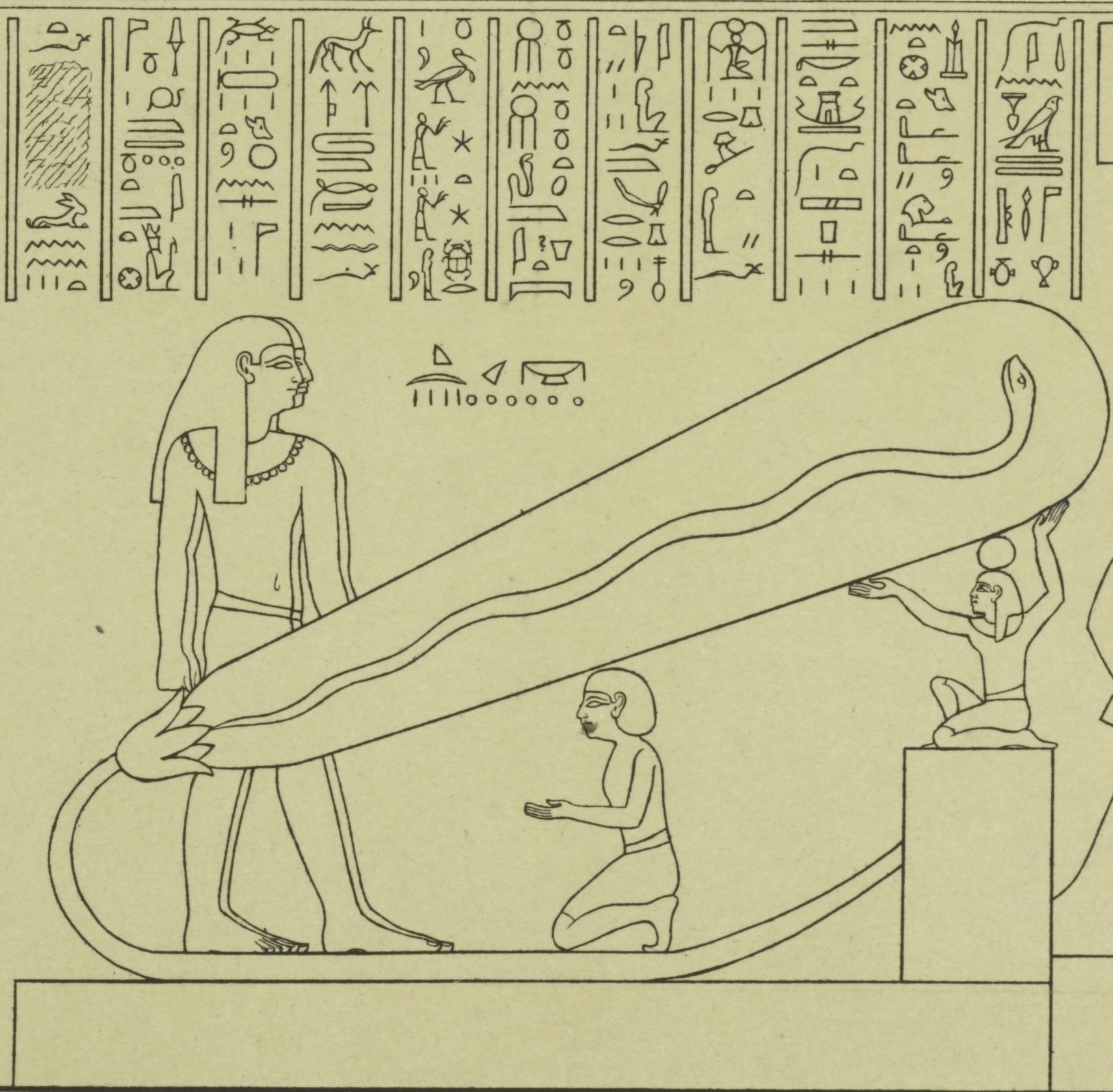
Object 1a

Text above the snake:

Words spoken by Harsomtus, the great God, who dwells in Dendera, who is in the arms of those at the prow in the Mesketet-night-barge, noble cobra, under whose Khenty-statue is Heh, whose crew carries in holiness [his] perfection, whose Ba caused the Rising [woman] to rise in the sky, whose form is revered by his followers, who comes in solitude, encircled by his Mehen-uraeus, countless of names at the front of Khu-en-sen, the power of Ra in the land of Atum (Dendera), the father of the Gods, who created that which exists.

Gold and metal, height: four palms

=== Object 1b – room G, south wall ===
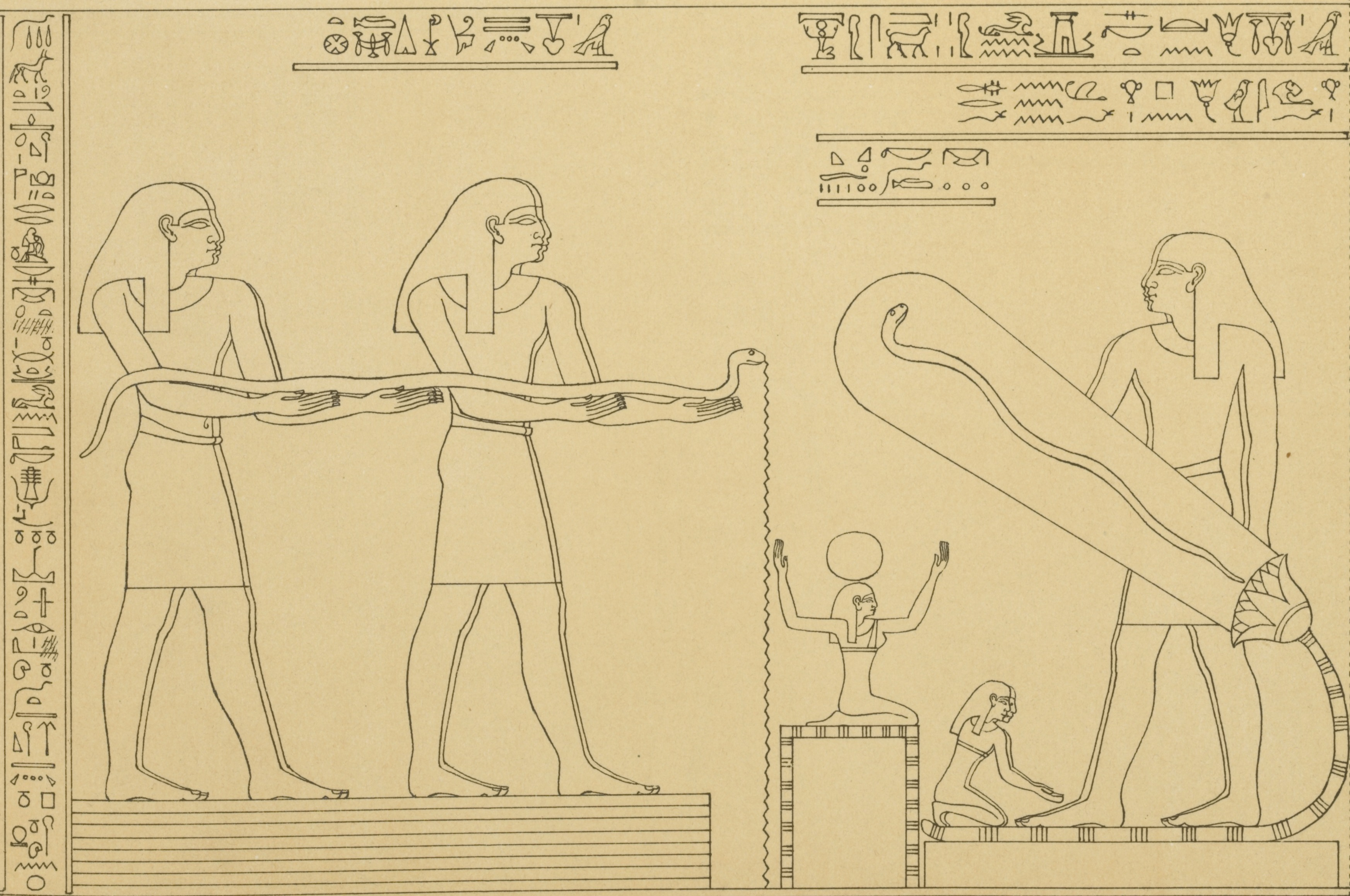
Object 1b

Text above the snake:

Harsomtus in the hn-container of the Mesketet-night-barge, four figures exist in it. The figure of heh is in front of him, this flower is behind him, the water beneath him.

Gold, another saying: Metal, height: four palms.

Text above the figures to the left:

Harsomtus of Khadi

=== Object 2a – crypt 1-C, south wall ===
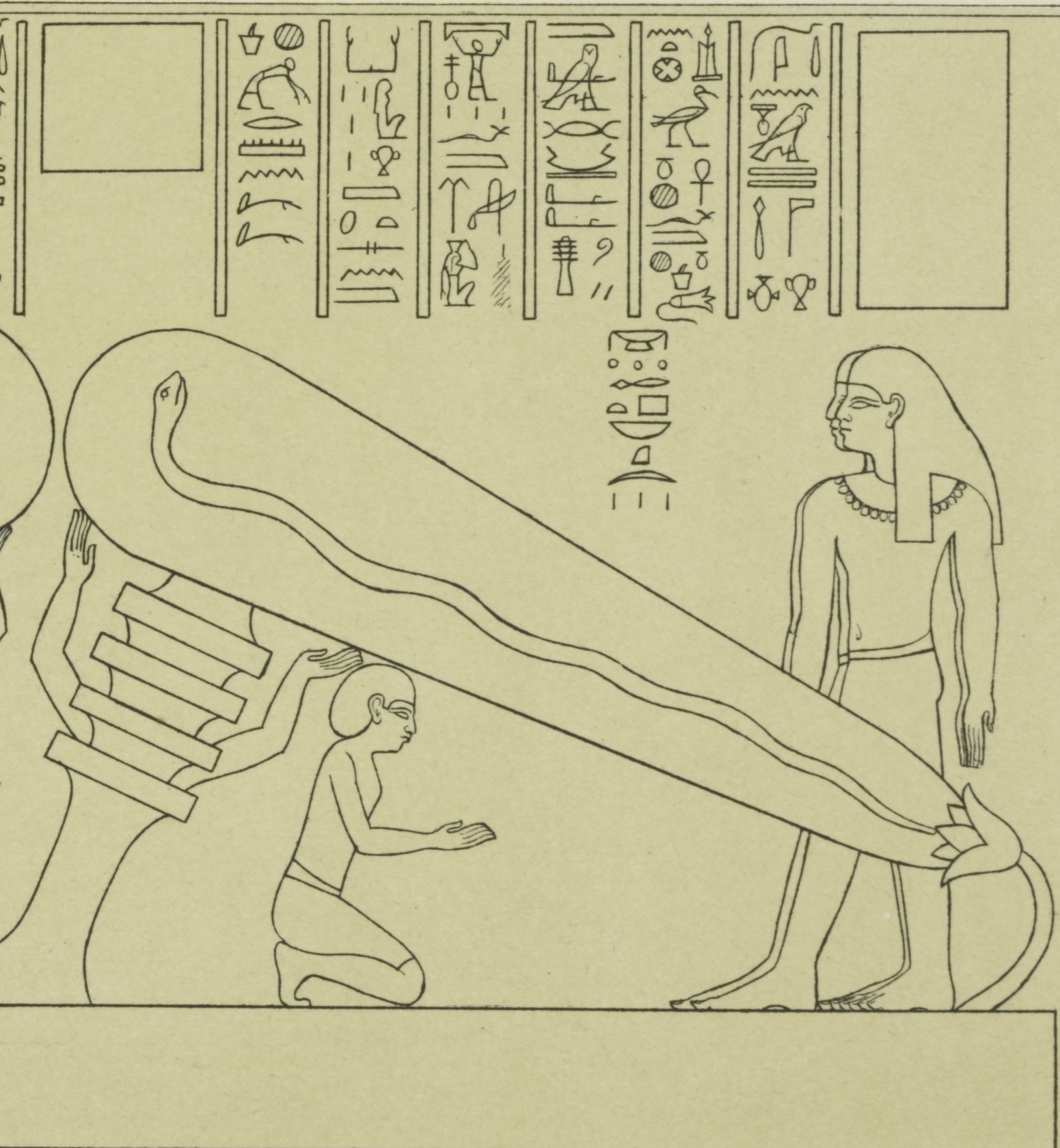
Object 2a

Text above the snake:

Words spoken by Harsomtus, the great God, who dwells in Dendera, the living Ba in the lotus flower of the Mandjet-day-barge, whose perfection is raised up by the two arms of the Djed-pillar as his Seshem-image, while the Ka's on their knees bend their arms.

Gold and all precious stones, height: three palms

=== Object 2b – room G, north wall ===
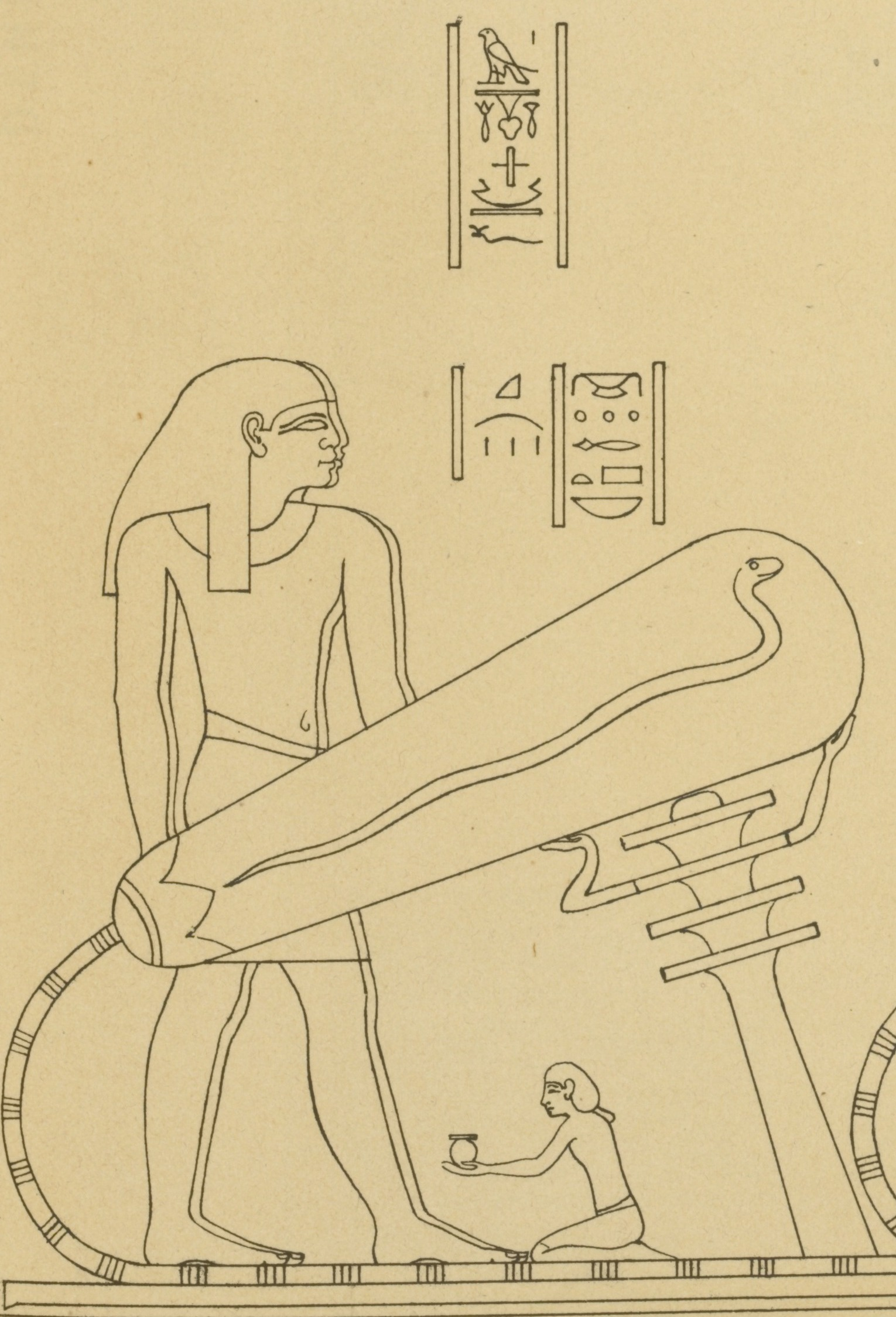
Object 2b

Text above the snake:

Harsomtus who is in his barge.

Height: three palms, gold and all precious stones

=== Object 3a – crypt 1-C, north wall ===
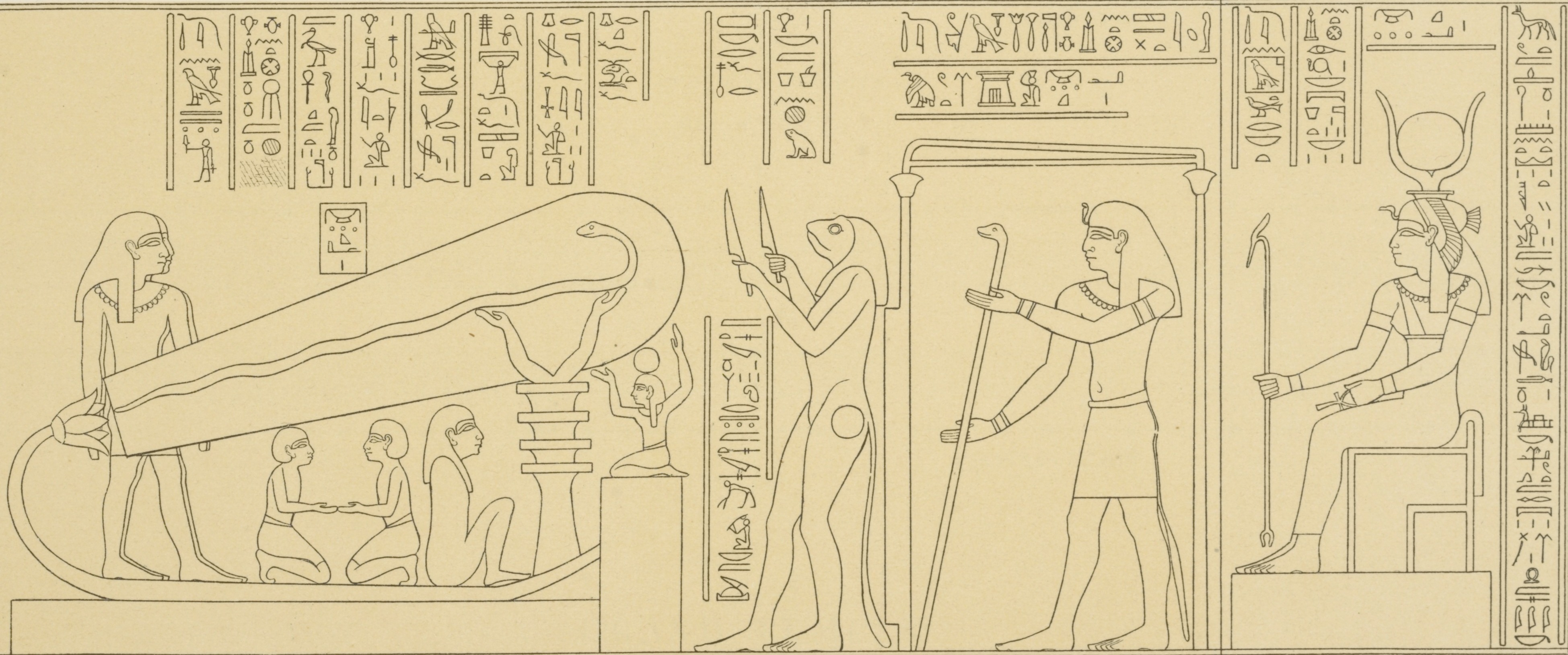
Object 3a

Text above the snake:

Words spoken by Harsomtus, the great God, who dwells in Dendera, who rises out of the lotus flower as a living Ba, whose perfection the Qematiu-images of his Ka are raising, whose Seshemu-image is raised (?) by the crew of the Mandjet-day-barge, whose body is carried by the djed-pillar, underneath his Seshemu-image is the Primeval [woman] and whose majesty is carried by the companions of his Ka.

Gold, height: one cubit

Text above the frog-headed figure:

Your name will be good for Wepet, your face is that of a Frog.

Text in front of the frog-headed figure:

I have cut your rebels down to the earth, I cut your enemy in the place of slaughter.

Text above the statue in the shrine:

Words spoken by Harsomtus, the great God, who dwells in Dendera, the hidden of form, protected in his shrine.

Gold, height: one cubit

=== Object 3b – room G, north wall ===
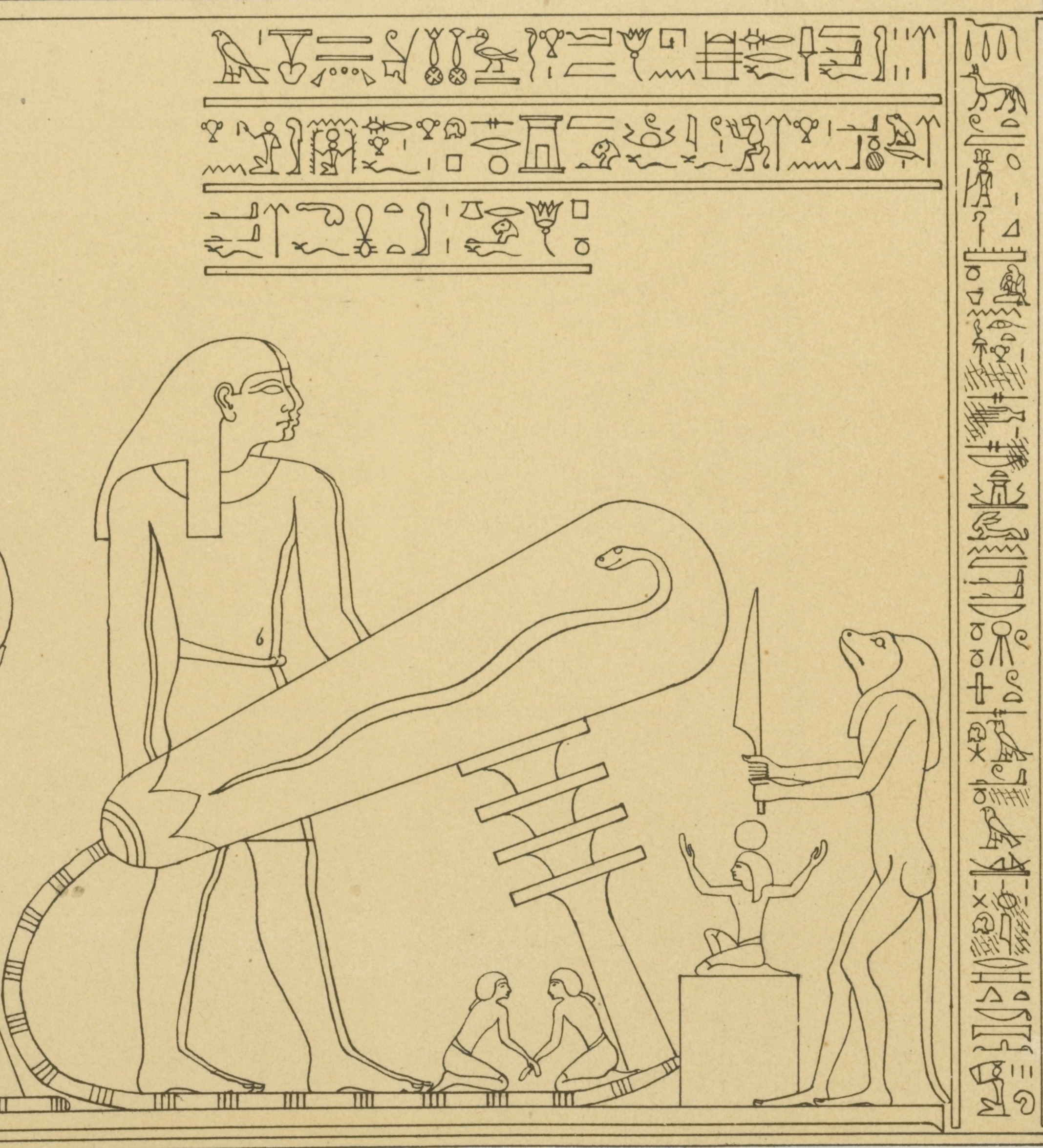
Object 3b

Text above the snake:

Harsomtus of Upper- and Lower Egypt, the Sa-ta-snake, who is emerging from the flower, which contains the hn-container, who is flanked by four figures with human faces, under his head the figure of Heh on the Serekh at the prow of his barge. The Iuf-monkey with the face of a toad, knives in his hands, is before him, as are the two figures that carry the front part of this flower.

== Related motifs ==
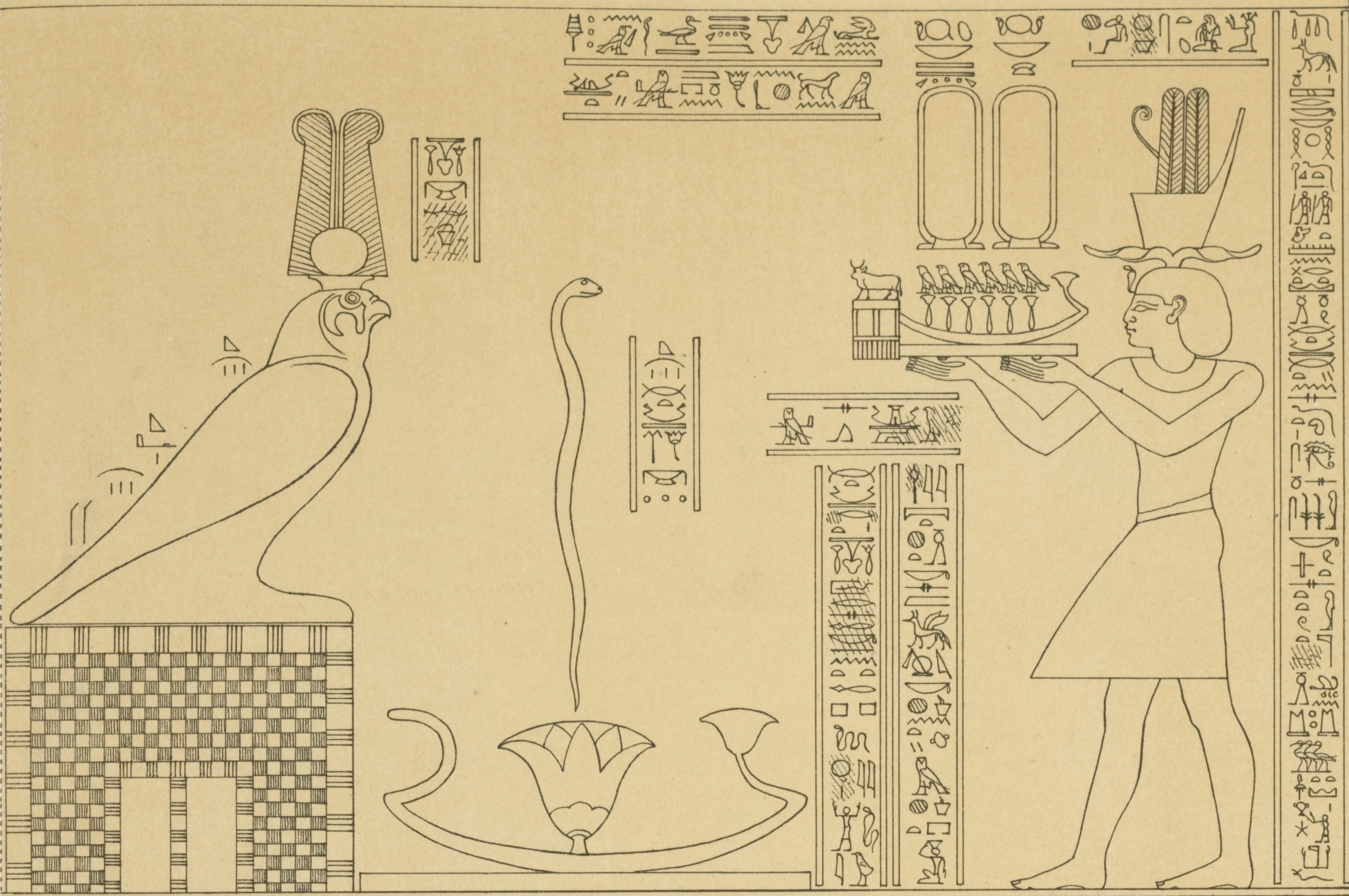

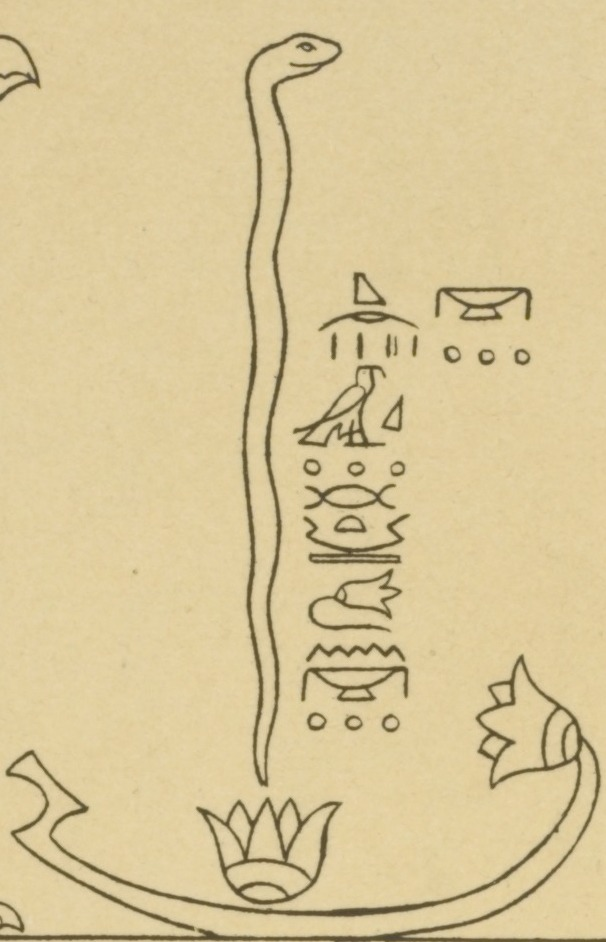

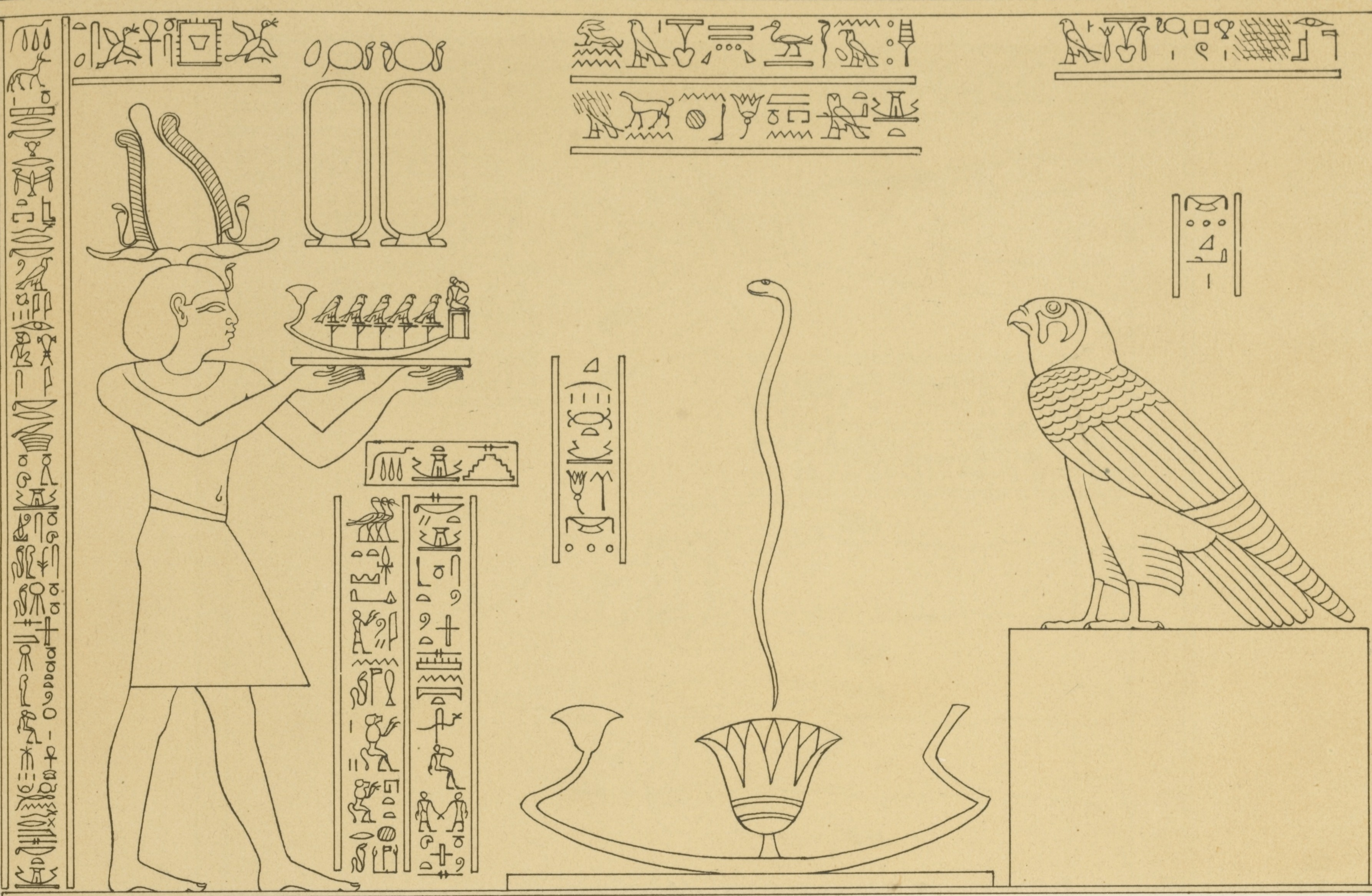

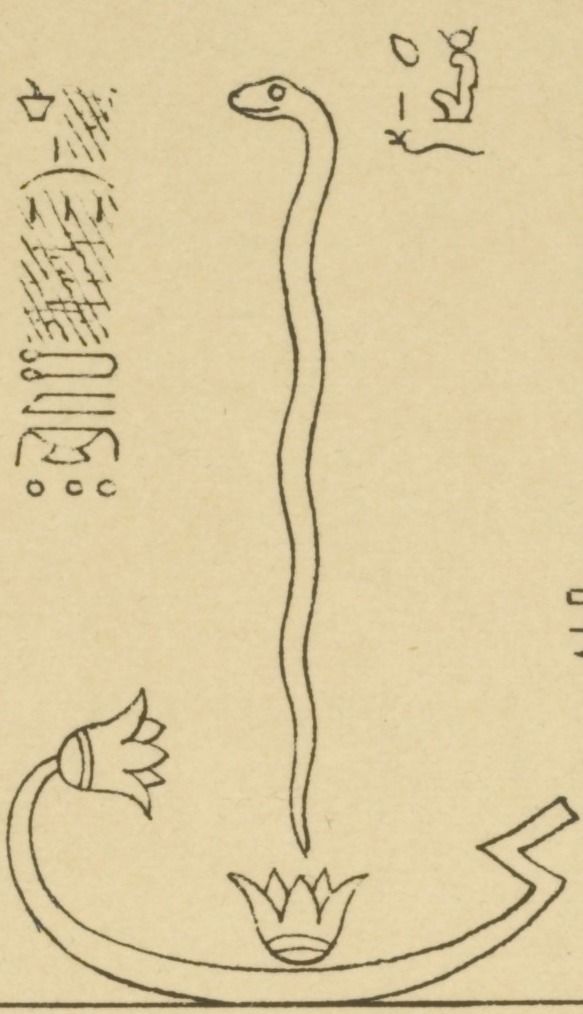

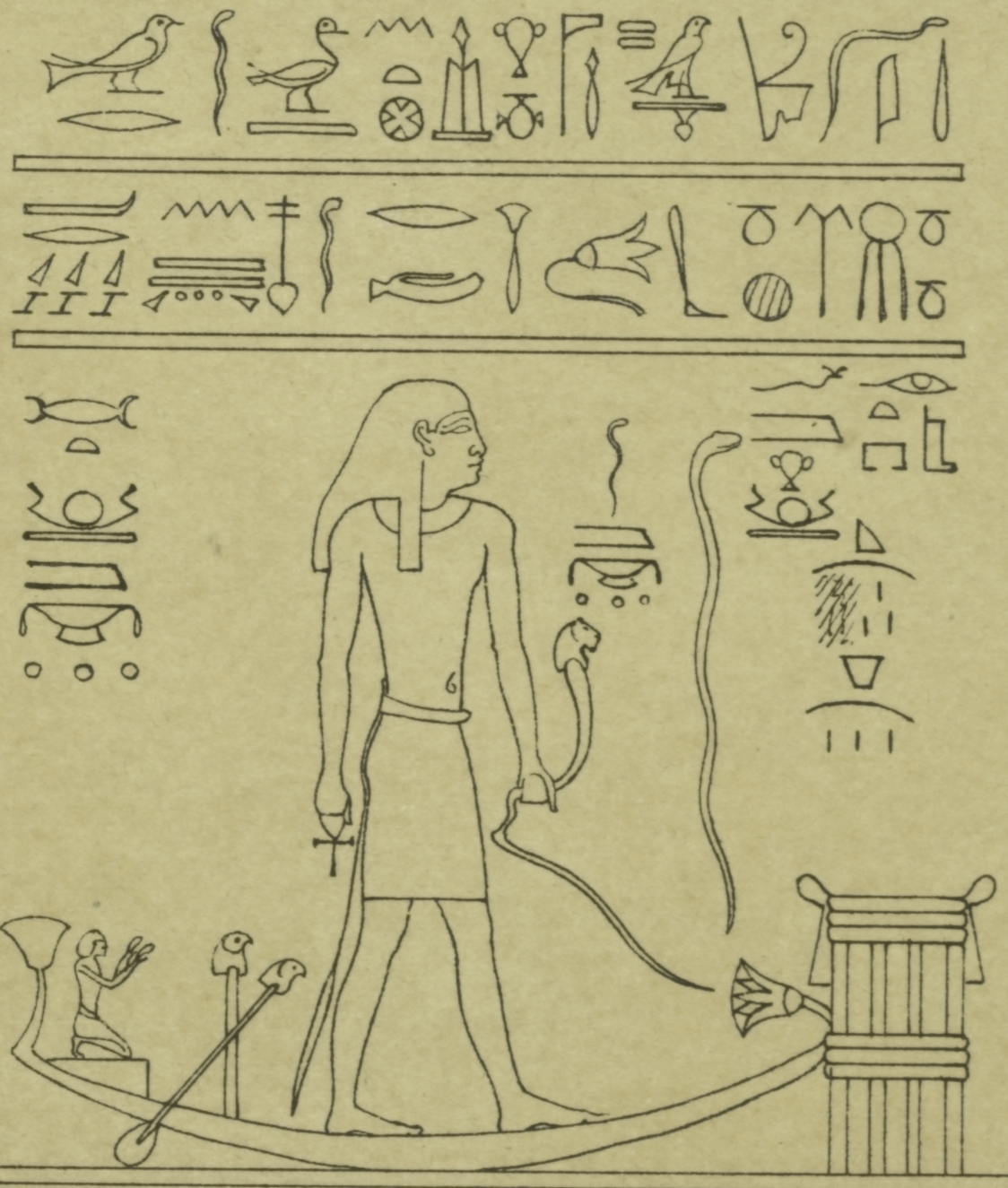

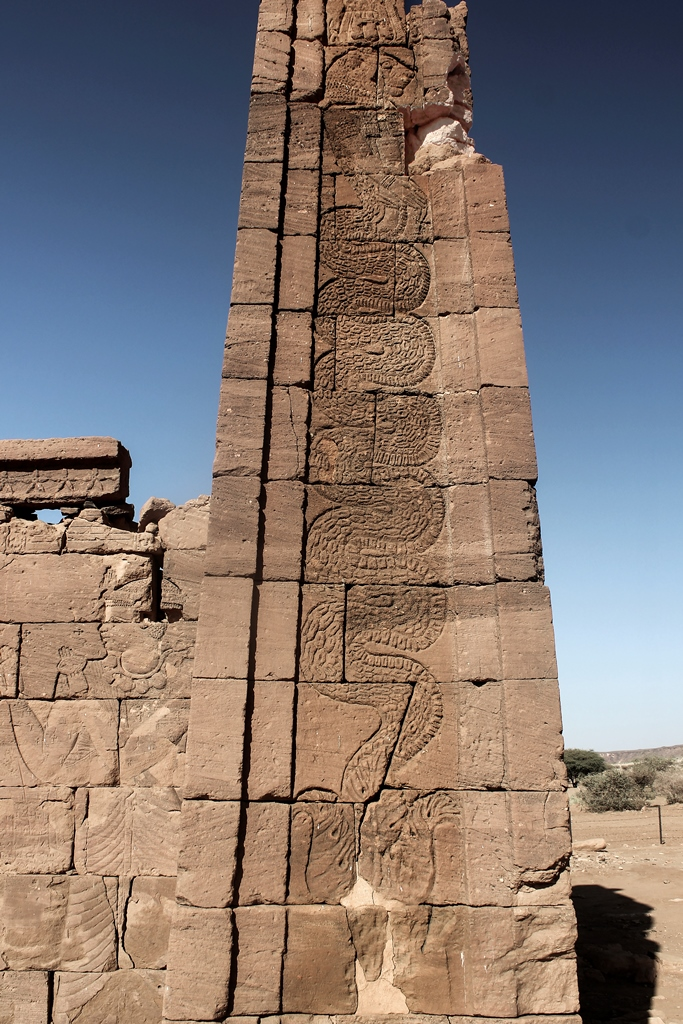

== Fringe interpretation ==
In contrast to the scientifically-known interpretation, a fringe theory proposes that the reliefs depict Ancient Egyptian technology, based on their visual similarity to modern devices such as the incandescent light bulb, cathode-ray tube, Geissler tube, and Crookes tube. Norman Lockyer's passing reference to a colleague's humorous suggestion that electric lamps would explain the absence of lampblack deposits in the tombs has sometimes been forwarded as an argument supporting this interpretation (another explanation is the use of a system of mirrors).

Proponents of this interpretation have also used a text stating that "high poles covered with copper plates were erected to break the storms (Note: storms mistyped as stones in source) coming from on high" to argue this, but Bolko Stern has written in detail explaining why the copper-covered tops of poles (which were lower than the associated pylons) do not relate to electricity or lightning, pointing out that no evidence of anything used to manipulate electricity had been found in Egypt and that this was a magical and not a technical installation.

Archaeologist and debunker Kenneth Feder argued that if ancient Egyptians really had such advanced technology, some light bulb remains (glass shards, metal sockets, filaments...) should have been discovered during archaeological excavations. By applying Occam's razor, he instead highlighted the feasibility of the aforementioned mirrors system, and that the ancient Egyptians knew that adding salt to torches minimized lampblack.

== See also ==
- Egyptian mythology

== Sources cited ==
- Dümichen, Johannes (1877). Baugeschichte des Denderatempels und Beschreibung der einzelnen Theile des Bauwerkes nach den an seinen Mauern befindlichen Inschriften [Construction history of the Dendera temple and description of the individual sections of the structure according to the inscriptions on its walls] (in German).
- Feder, Kenneth H. (2014). Frauds, Myths, and Mysteries: Science and Pseudoscience in Archaeology. New York: McGraw-Hill. ISBN 978-0-07-803507-4.
- Kolbe, Bruno (1908). An Introduction to Electricity. Kegan Paul, Trench, Trübner.
- Lockyer, Norman (1894). The Dawn of Astronomy.
- Mariette, Auguste (1870). Dendérah: description générale du grand temple de cette ville [Dendera: general description of the great temple of this city] (in French).
- Stern, Bolko (1896). Ägyptische Kulturgeschichte [Egyptian cultural history] (in German). Reprint-Verlag-Leipzig.
- Waitkus, Wolfgang (1997). Die Texte in den unteren Krypten des Hathortempels von Dendera: ihre Aussagen zur Funktion und Bedeutung dieser Räume [The texts in the lower crypts of the Hathor temples of Dendera: their statements regarding the function and meaning of these rooms] (in German). ISBN 3-8053-2322-0.
- Waitkus, Wolfgang (2002). "Die Geburt des Harsomtus aus der Blüte — Zur Bedeutung und Funktion einiger Kultgegenstände des Tempels von Dendera" [The birth of Harsomtus from the flower — The meaning and function of some of the cultural objects of the temple of Dendera]. Studien zur Altägyptischen Kultur (in German). 30: 373–394. JSTOR 25152877.
- Richter, Barbara Ann (2012). "The Theology of Hathor of Dendera: Aural and Visual Scribal Techniques in the Per-Wer Sanctuary" (PDF).
