= Mao ou Maurras? =

1970 interview between two young political activists

- Editor: Éditions Beauchesne
- Author: Philippe Hamel, Patrice Sicard
- Series: Carrefour des Jeunes
- Genre: Interview
- Publication date: 1970
- Publication place: France
- Pages: 135

Mao ou Maurras? (Mao or Maurras?) is the transcription of an interview between two young political activists Philippe Hamel, communist, and Patrice Sicard, royalist from Action française, published in 1970. Guy Baret, future journalist at Le Figaro, brings them together in this second volume of the collection Carrefour des Jeunes.

== Presentation ==
Philippe Hamel, aged 20, is a philosophy student and Patrice Sicard, aged 23, is a law student at Assas. The first is an activist within a communist Action Committee and got involved during the first fortnight of May 1968. The second is responsible for the propaganda unit of the student office of the Restauration nationale and editor of the weekly Aspects de la France and the monthly AF Université'. Philippe Hamel is an activist figure of lesser importance than that of Patrice Sicard and “this imbalance [...] is found in terms of their speeches”.

Philippe Hamel gives a presentation of Marxist-Leninist thought, the importance of a vanguard party and on Maoism.

Patrice Sicard's speech allows us to study the interpretation of May 1968 through the Maurrasian prism and the intellectual compromises of an activist generation. Initially, Action Française condemned the rebellion of May 1968, judging it as a “Marxist threat” before then seeking to recover it by organizing a “counter-revolution”. The extension of the struggle from the Nanterre campus to the universities of the Latin Quarter and the emergence of Gaullist counter-demonstrations forced Action Française to review its strategy: "the revolt had to begin to be part of a militant memory always faithful to royalist commitment, as a prelude to a possible political opportunity”.

I must admit that I experienced deeply in May 1968 […] We know that if the Marxists attempt, in the near future, the definitive revolutionary effort, the people will not be able to count on the parties or on the notables. He will only count on himself, and on his vanguard: the counter-revolutionary of Action Française.

— Patrice Sicard

The two activists agree on the denunciation of contemporary society but diverge in their analyses. Patrice Sicard criticizes the illusions of progress, of the consumer society and refers to Guy Debord by repeating his criticism of “augmented survival”.

== Critics ==
The Revue des Deux Mondes welcomes this exchange on “neutral ground [between] two supporters of the most opposing ideologies”.

== Bibliography ==
- Cucchetti, Humberto (2015). "De la nouvelle action française à la nouvelle action royaliste. Analyse du processus de mutation militante à partir d'une trajectoire organisationnelle nationaliste". Pôle Sud. 42 (42): 87–104. doi:10.3917/psud.042.0087.
- Dard, Olivier (2012). "Des maorassiens aux maosoccidents: réflexions sur un label et sa pertinence en lisant un essai récent". Les territoires du politique: Hommages à Sylvie Guillaume, historienne du politique. Rennes: Presses universitaires de Rennes. ISBN 978-2-7535-6902-7.
