= The Morning of the Magicians =

1960 book by Louis Pauwels and Jacques Bergier

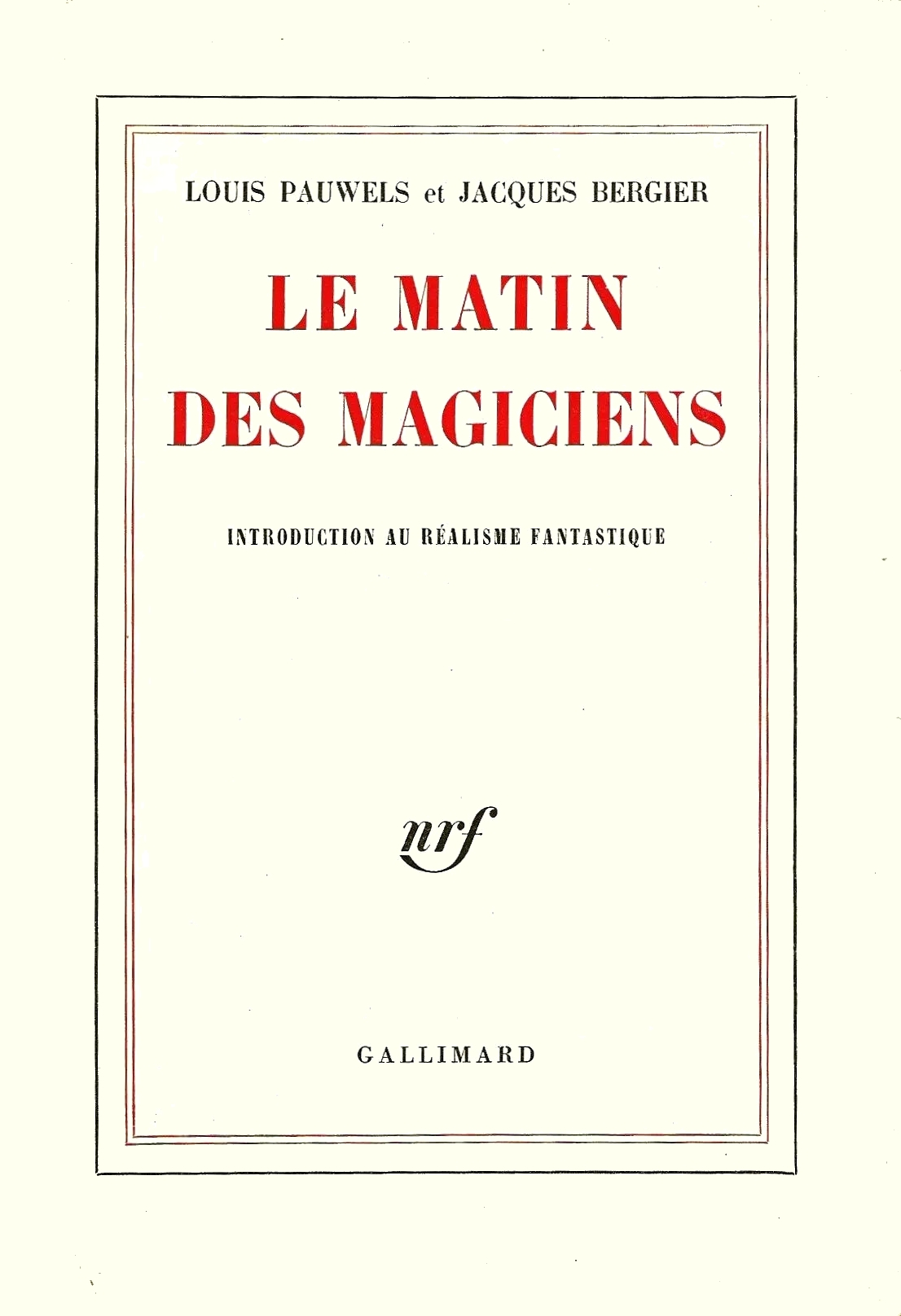
- Cover of the first edition
- Authors: Louis Pauwels; Jacques Bergier
- Original title: Le Matin des magiciens
- Translator: Rollo Myers
- Language: French
- Subject: The occult
- Publisher: Éditions Gallimard
- Publication date: 1960
- Publication place: France
- English publication date: 1963 (Stein and Day)
- Media type: Print

The Morning of the Magicians: Introduction to Fantastic Realism (French: Le Matin des magiciens: Introduction au réalisme fantastique) is a 1960 book by French journalist Louis Pauwels and Russian-French author Jacques Bergier. It covers topics like cryptohistory, ufology, the occult, alchemy, spiritual philosophy. The book is widely credited with the proliferation of numerous myths related to occultism in Nazism.

== Background and publication history ==
Pauwels and Bergier worked on the book over five years, compiling voluminous documentation incorporated into the Bibliothèque nationale de France as Fonds Pauwels in 2007. Heavily influenced by Charles Fort's work and ideas, the authors' primary aim was to arouse the curiosity of their readership, stating "Let us repeat that there will be a lot of silliness in our book, but this matters little if the book stirs up a few vocations and, to a certain degree, prepares broader tracks for research".

Written in French, Le Matin des magiciens was translated into English by Rollo Myers in 1963 in the United Kingdom under the title The Dawn of Magic, and in 1964 released in the United States as The Morning of the Magicians (Stein and Day; paperback in 1968 by Avon Books). A German edition was published 1962 with the title Aufbruch ins dritte Jahrtausend (Departure into the Third Millennium). It was also translated into several other languages.

== Contents ==
As the authors disclaim in their preface, the book is intended to challenge readers' viewpoints on historic events, whether they believe the explanations or not, but with the goal to give readers the opportunity to test their level of cognitive dissonance and critical thinking skills. It covers topics like cryptohistory, ufology, occultism in Nazism, alchemy, spiritual philosophy and is thus often referenced by conspiracy-theory enthusiasts. Part two (about 1/4 of the book) is dedicated to the Nazi-Occult connections.

== Influence and criticism ==
The Morning of the Magicians became a cult classic within the youth culture in France in the 1960s and the 1970s. There was a hostile reception from skeptic reviewers (notable among whom were the secular humanists Yves Galifret, Evry Schatzman and Jean-Claude Pecker from the Rationalist Union, who debunked the book in Le Crépuscule des magiciens (1965); "The Twilight of the Magicians"). Despite the book originally being in French, it was mostly discussed by English- and German-speaking audiences.

The book was a commercial success and bestseller. Pauwels and Bergier went on to pursue their interest in the paranormal in the magazine Planète, dedicated to what they termed réalisme fantastique (fantastic realism). Both The Morning of the Magicians and the Planète magazine had considerable influence on the esotericism of the 1960s–1970s counterculture, heralding the popularization of certain New Age ideas.

In a 2004 article for Skeptic, the author Jason Colavito wrote that the book's tales of ancient astronauts predated Erich von Däniken's works on the topic, and that the ideas are so close to the fictional works of H. P. Lovecraft such as "The Call of Cthulhu" or At the Mountains of Madness (published in 1928 and 1931, respectively) that, according to Colavito, it is probable that Lovecraft's fiction directly inspired the book.

Kenneth Feder comments on this book in his book Frauds, Myths, and Mysteries. After noting several major errors relating to archaeology, he comments that "The often bizarre claims in 'The Morning of the Magicians that were related to physics, chemistry, biology, psychology, and history seemed plausible to me primarily because I did not have the knowledge necessary to assess them intelligibly." Christian Giudice described it as an "an allegedly nonfiction exposé of occult influences on historical events, conspiracy theories, and what may be defined as proto- ancient astronaut theories". He also credited it with helping start the New Age movement.

The book is widely regarded as being responsible for the proliferation of numerous myths related to occultism in Nazism. Stéphane François credits it with the beginning of the literary trend of books regarding occultism in Nazism, crediting the book with truly bringing to life the "myth of Nazi esotericism". Nicholas Goodrick-Clarke noted that numerous successive works on Nazi occultism were in some part influenced by the book.
