= Harsomtus =

Egyptian god

Name in hieroglyphs
G5 zmA wAD HD or G6 s mn n xpr xpr nTr or G5 Z1 zmA tA tA
- Major cult center: Edfu and Dendera
- Parents: Heru-Behdeti and Hathor

Harsomtus (also known as Harsomptus and Somtus) was an ancient Egyptian child god with main cult places at Dendera and Edfu. This less-known deity was worshipped from the Old Kingdom period all the way to Graeco-Roman Egypt. Popularity of Harsomtus, along with other child gods, greatly increased in the Graeco-Roman period, with most information coming from that era. The connection with Horus had formed early, and Harsomtus is considered by researchers to be a form of Ra or Horus. His name translates to "Horus who unites the two lands."

== Iconography ==
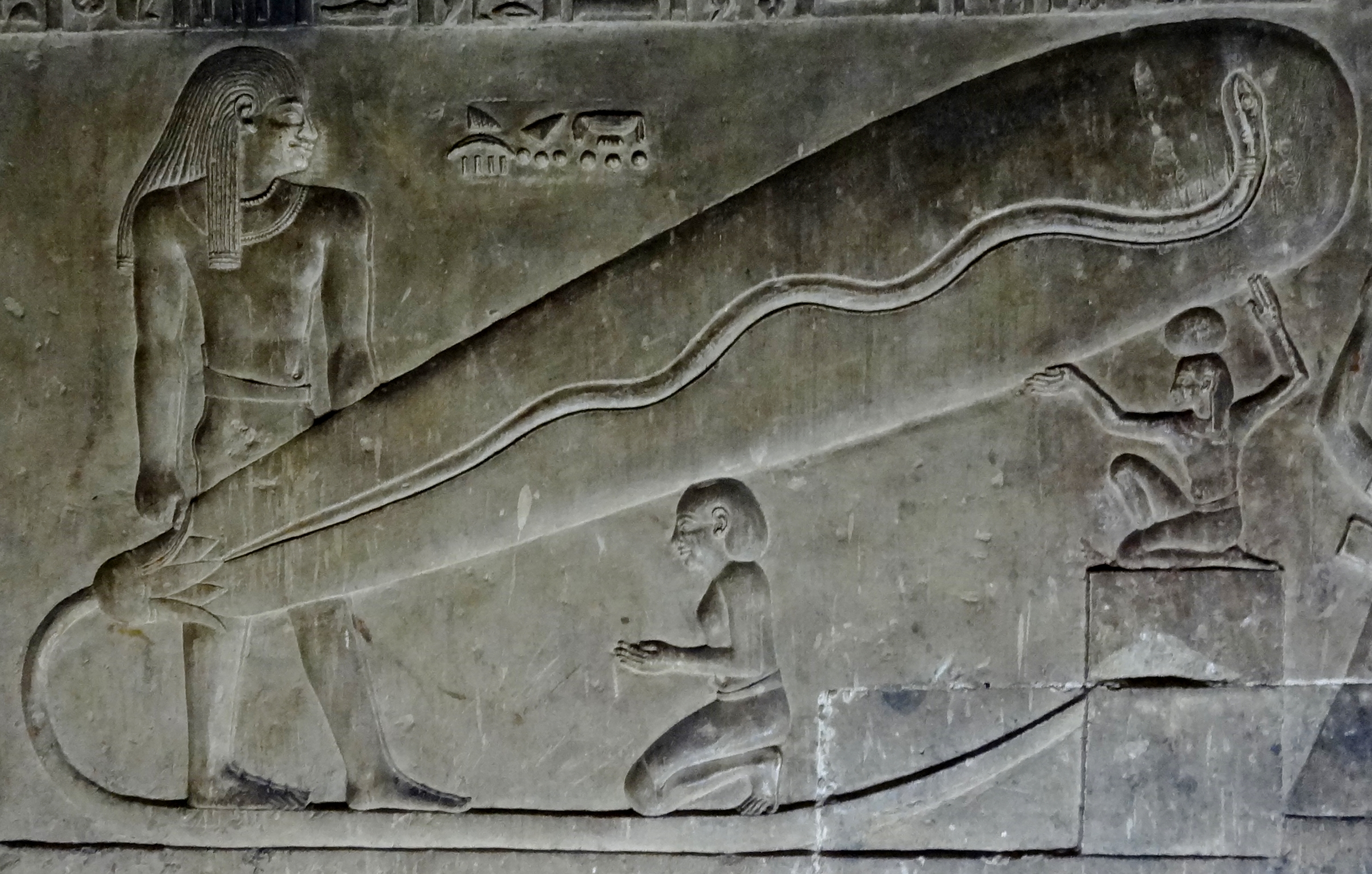
The so-called Dendera light depicting Harsomtus as a snake emerging from a lotus

Harsomtus usually appears as a naked child sitting on a lotus flower. He can also appear as a snake that emerges from a lotus flower as seen in several reliefs at the temple of Dendera.

Due to connection with Horus, Harsomtus can appear with a falcon head.

== Mythology ==
Harsomtus simultaneously embodies sun, primordial, and creator god: the emergence of the world from the primordial matter is linked to the daily sunrise.

Harsomtus is the son of Hathor and Horus in the form of Heru-Behdeti, with these two gods he formed the Triad of Edfu. Harsomtus is very similar to Ihy because both were child deities that were the son of Hathor and Horus.

In Thebes during the late New Kingdom, Harsomtus became the firstborn son of Amun and Hathor-chief-of-Thebes, a local Theban form of the goddess Hathor. He was worshiped in the Mammisi of the Hathor Temple in Deir el-Medina as well as in the Ptah Temple in Karnak. Hathor and Harsomtus were frequently equated with Isis and another childform of Horus named Hariese ("Horus, the son of Isis").

== Sources ==
- Bunson, Margaret (2002). "Harsomtus". Encyclopedia of Ancient Egypt. New York, NY: Facts on File, Inc. p. 159. ISBN 0-8160-4563-1.
- Gestermann, Louise (1984). "Hathor, Harsomtus und MnTw-Htp. w II" (PDF). Studien zu Sprache und Religion Ägyptens. Zu Ehren von Wolfhart Westendorf überreicht von seinen Freunden und Schülern (in German). Vol. 2. Göttingen. pp. 763–776.
- Waitkus, Wolfgang (1997). Die Texte in den unteren Krypten des Hathortempels von Dendera: ihre Aussagen zur Funktion und Bedeutung dieser Räume [The texts in the lower crypts of the Hathor temples of Dendera: their statements regarding the function and meaning of these rooms] (in German). P. von Zabern. ISBN 3-8053-2322-0.
- Waitkus, Wolfgang (2002). "Die Geburt des Harsomtus aus der Blüte — Zur Bedeutung und Funktion einiger Kultgegenstände des Tempels von Dendera" [The birth of Harsomtus from the flower — The meaning and function of some of the cultural objects of the temple of Dendera]. Studien zur Altägyptischen Kultur (in German). 30: 373–394. JSTOR 25152877.
