= L'Amour monstre =

1954 novel by Louis Pauwels

- Author: Louis Pauwels
- Language: French
- Publisher: Éditions du Seuil
- Publication date: 1954
- Publication place: France
- Pages: 228

L'Amour monstre ("monstrous love") is a 1954 novel by the French writer Louis Pauwels. It is set in the 16th century and tells the story of a possibly bewitched love affair between a doctor and a young woman sent to a monastery.

The novel was the runner-up for the 1955 Prix Goncourt. Ingmar Bergman was at one point attached to direct a film adaptation, but the project was not realised.

The book is mentioned in the lyrics of Serge Gainsbourg's 1968 song "Initials B.B." Gainsbourg had been recommended the book by Brigitte Bardot.
