= Louis Pauwels =

French journalist

Louis Pauwels (French: [povɛls]; 2 August 1920 – 28 January 1997) was a French journalist and writer.

Born in Paris, France, he wrote in many monthly literary French magazines as early as 1946 (including Esprit and Variété) until the 1950s. He participated in the foundation of Travail et Culture (Work and Culture) in 1946 (intended to spread culture to the masses, and of which he was the secretary). In 1948, he joined the work groups of G. I. Gurdjieff for 15 months, until he became editor in chief of Combat in 1949 and editor of the newspaper Paris-Presse. He directed (among others) the Bibliothèque Mondiale (Worldwide Library) (the precursor of "Livre de Poche" ["Pocket Books"]), Carrefour (Intersection), the monthly women's Marie Claire and the magazine Arts et Culture in 1952.

== Biography ==
Louis Pauwels was a teacher at Athis-Mons from 1939 to 1945. His degree, (licence de Lettres) was interrupted by the beginning of the Second World War.

Pauwels met Jacques Bergier in 1954 while he was the literary director of Bibliothèque Mondiale (World Library). He wrote Le Matin des Magiciens (The Dawn of Magic or The Morning of the Magicians) in 1960, and in 1970 the interrupted continuation of "L'Homme Eternel" (The Eternal Man). Constantly with Bergier (as well as François Richaudeau), he founded the bi-monthly magazine Planète in October 1961 (around 150 pages) that appeared until May 1968 (and would appear again that same year under the title le Nouveau Planète (the New Planet); 64 numbers in total between the two editions). Various studies were researched and published in a collection which the authors called "Encyclopédie Planète" (each volume containing around 250 pages, with around thirty volumes in all). The seventeen "Anthologies Planètes" dedicated to Jacques Sternberg grouped short texts by various authors on a given subject together. A great friend of Aimé Michel, the "Planète" was also dedicated to him. In the 1970s, he became friends with some members of GRECE.

Pauwels wrote numerous articles for Le Journal du Dimanche (The Sunday Newspaper) from 1975 to 1976. In 1977, he directed the cultural services of Le Figaro, where he established the bases of the Le Figaro Magazine, which was launched in October 1978 as a weekly supplement to the newspaper Le Figaro. The intention of Robert Hersant was to create a counterweight to the influential Le Nouvel Observateur that he considered too left-wing. Louis Pauwels was in charge of the new magazine. Louis Pauwels offered initially the position of chief editor to Alain de Benoist who declined it due to his editorial duties at Éléments and at the Éditions Copernic. Jean-Claude Valla (politics and society) and Patrice de Plunkett (culture) thus became the first chief editors. Members of the GRECE including Alain de Benoist, Michel Marmin and Yves Chisten contributed to Le Figaro Magazine until the summer of 1979. After their departure, the tone of the magazine became more libertarian (on economics) while remaining socially conservative. Louis Pauwels remained at the head of the weekly until 1993. When students demonstrated against the Devaquet law on universities in 1986, Louis Pauwels penned his most famous editorial on the Mental AIDS that had hit French youth. He founded, with Gabriel Veraldi and Rémy Chauvin, la Fondation Marcel et Monique Odier de Psycho-Physique in Geneva in 1992.

Returning to his Catholic faith, he spoke against his past associated with Planète (Alain de Benoist thus dedicated his book Comment peut-on être païen? (How Can One Be a Pagan?) to Pauwels in 1981 (ed. Albin Michel), a short while before his conversion in 1982 in Acapulco).

== Bibliography ==
- Franchise 4 : où sont les femmes ?, 1945. First appearance of Louis Pauwel in print, in this illustrated magazine he conceived and created with J. Sylveire and P. Faucheux, director Pierre Garrigues (no unique, Paris, Curiosa).
- Saint quelqu'un, Paris, Éditions du Seuil, 1946.
- (with Lanza del Vasto and Julien Gracq), Cheval blanc, 2 vol., Paris, 1947–1948.
- Les Voies de petite communication, Paris, Éditions du Seuil, "Pierres Vives" collection, 1949.
- (et al.), Paris des rêves, Lausanne, Éd. Clairefontaine, Lausanne, 1950.
- Le Château du dessous, Paris, Gallimard, 1952.
- L'Amour monstre, Paris, Éditions du Seuil, 1954, rééd. 1984 (second place, prix Goncourt 1954).
- Monsieur Gurdjieff : documents, témoignages, textes et commentaires sur une société initiatique contemporaine, Paris, Éditions du Seuil 1954, rééd. Albin Michel, 1979 et 1995.
- Le Matin des magiciens : introduction au réalisme fantastique – fantastic realism / Louis Pauwels et Jacques Bergier. éd. Gallimard, 1960.
- La Gloire de Sacha Guitry / Louis Pauwels. ed CAL. 1961. Five masterpieces selected and presented under the direction of Louis Pauwels
- La femme est rare . Revue Planète, n° 02. Editions Planète, Décembre 1961– Janvier 1962, in 4 carré, broché, couverture IIllustrée, 159 pp.
- En français dans le texte / Louis Pauwels / Jacques Mousseau / Jean Feller, France-Empire 1962. Reprise d'entretiens télévisés de personnalités du moment.
- L'Homme éternel / Louis Pauwels et Jacques Bergier. éd. Gallimard, 1970. (Embellissement de la vie; 1)
- La Roulette du Bon Dieu : incroyables mais vraies, 200 histoires / Louis Pauwels (aux commentaires) / Pol Quentin, éd. Hachette, 1971.
- Impossible Possibilities (with Jack Bergier), 1973, ASIN B000LIF25O
- Président Faust / Louis Pauwels; textes et poèmes originaux du film TV (dramatique) de Louis Pauwels et Jean Kerchbron; ill. de Gourmelin. éd. Albin Michel, 1974.
- Blumroch l'admirable, ou Le déjeuner du surhomme / Louis Pauwels. éd. Gallimard, 1976. (Folio; 1062)
- Histoires magiques de l'histoire de France / Louis Pauwels, Guy Breton. éd. Albin Michel, 1977, tomes 1 et 2.
- Nouvelles histoires magiques / Louis Pauwels, Guy Breton. éd. Albin Michel, 1978.
- Histoires extraordinaires / Guy Breton, Louis Pauwels. éd. Albin Michel, 1980.
- Nouvelles histoires extraordinaires / Louis Pauwels, Guy Breton. éd. Albin Michel, 1982.
- Histoires fantastiques / Guy Breton, Louis Pauwels. éd. Albin Michel, 1983.

Sixth and last work in the series

- Catalogue of the Dali exposition (at casino de Knokke Le Zoute) / Louis Pauwels. éd. de la Connaissance, 1956, Bruxelles.
- François d'Assise / Louis Pauwels / Jean Feller / Jean-Pierre Grabet (photos), éd. Hachette, 1958, "Les reportages dans l'histoire" collection.
- Les Cent plus beaux poèmes d'amour / (réunis par) Louis Pauwels, éd. Bibliothèque du Club de la femme, 1960.
- Le tout télévision / Rogey Andrey, Michel Delain, Gérald Pechemez et Christian Quidet, éd. France Empire, 1961 (21 portraits of celebrities of the small screen, of which Louis Pauwels).
- Jean Giono… Regain / Maximilien Vox / Louis Pauwels (entretiens avec un homme heureux, Jean Giono), éd. Club des Amis du Livre, 1962.
- Les Passions selon Dali / Louis Pauwels. éd Denoel 1968, rééd. 2004.

In the late sixties, Salvador Dalí agrees with Louis Pauwels long conversations in his house in Portlligat, north of Cadaqués. Dali book, staged by intuitions image or gesture. Burning stages of a rationalizing discourse, it serves its raw truth. The questions the interviewer will be erased to make room for all the verve of the Catalan painter who recites with humor and impertinence his surrealist ideas.

- Les Derniers Jours de la monogamie / Louis Pauwels / Laslo Havas. éd Mercure de France 1969.
- Témoins de notre temps / Lise Payette et Laurent Bourguignon, éd. du Jour, Montréal/Canada, 1971 : retranscription des entrevues de Louis Pauwels, Alain Bombard, Georges Simenon, Jean Rostand, Marguerite Duras, Marcel Achard, Hervé Bazin et Catherine Deneuve, à Paris en mars 1970, diffusées de juin à septembre 1970 par le réseau français de Radio-Canada, dans l'émission quotidienne " D'un jour à l'autre " de Lise Payette.
- Lettre ouverte aux gens heureux et qui ont bien raison de l'être. éd. Albin Michel, 1971.(coll. Lettre ouverte).(Réponse dans : Lettre à Louis Pauwels sur les gens inquiets et qui ont bien le droit de l'être / Paul Sérant, éd. La Table Ronde, 1972, et dans Lettre aux gens malheureux, et qui ont bien raison de l'être /Jacques Sternberg, éd. Eric Losfeld, coll. L'Extricable, 1972).
- L'Amour à refaire (dossier Planète, 10 ans de recherches) / Louis Pauwels / Wilhelm Reich / Léo Ferret, éditions Planète, 1971.
- Pierre-Yves Tremois – rencontre: gravures, monotypes / Louis Pauwels / Henry de Montherlant / Jean Rostand, éd. Jacques Frapier, 1971, rééd. Frédéric Birr, 1977.
- La Confession impardonnable / Louis Pauwels, éd. Mercure de France, 1972.
- Louange du tabac / Louis Pauwels. éd Trinckvel, 1972.
- Ce que je crois / Louis Pauwels. Montréal : Éditions La Presse; éd. Grasset, 1974, dédicacé Au Noble Aimé Michel.
- Françoise Adnet / Louis Pauwels, éd. Max Fourny (son époux) : Art et industrie : Vilo, 1977.

Reproductions of the artist's paintings.

- L'Arche de Noé et les naïfs / Louis Pauwels, assisted by Hélène Renard and Myriam Sicouri-Roos... Irena Polanec; éd. Max Fourny : Art et industrie : Vilo, 1977.
- La Fin du monde ? : études et documents / presented par Louis Pauwels and Aimé Michel. éd. Retz, 1977.
- La Face cachée de la France / Louis Pauwels, tome 1, éd Seghers, 1978. collection " mémoire vive " (avec chapitre d'Aimé Michel).
- Comment devient-on ce que l'on est ? / Louis Pauwels, éd. Stock, 1978. (Les Grands auteurs)
- L'Apprentissage de la sérénité / Louis Pauwels, éd. Retz : Centre d'étude et de promotion de la lecture, 1978, coll. " Les encyclopédies du mieux-être ", prix Chateaubriand 1978.
- Mensuel Lire no. 41 de 1979, "Littérature moderne – littérature française" : Louis Pauwels, Albert Camus.
- L'Homme et sa réalisation / Louis Pauwels, Lanza del Vasto, Gustave Thibon, Maurice Genevoix, etc.; interviews collected by Éric Edelmann, éd. Beauschesne, 1980.
- Le Droit de parler / Louis Pauwels; préf. de Jean-Edern Hallier. éd. Albin Michel, 1981.

Recueil des chroniques que l'auteur a rédigés, d'octobre 1977 à mars 1981, pour le Series chronicles the author has written, from October 1977 to March 1981, for Figaro and Le Figaro Magazine.

- Romans / Louis Pauwels. éd. Albin Michel, 1982. Reprise version omnibus de quatre ouvrages antérieurs de l'éditeur.
- Verlinde (les œuvres de) / Louis Pauwels, éd. Natiris, 1983
- La liberté guide mes pas : chroniques, 1981–1983 / Louis Pauwels. éd. Albin Michel, 1984.
- Lire Gustave Corcao / Louis Pauwels – essai 500 ex. éditions E, 1987. A homage to the monks of the Sainte-Madeleine Benedictin monastery
- Dix ans de silence : poésies / Louis Pauwels. éd. Grasset, 1989.
- Dali m'a dit / Louis Pauwels. éd. Carrère, 1989.
- Andrew Vicari. Vie et œuvres / Louis Pauwels (La Vigonade à Vicari) / Daniel Curzi, éd. G.E.P., 1989, 3000 ex.
- Le Mythe de l'objectivité (étude) / Louis Pauwels, délégué de l'Académie des Beaux-Arts à la séance publique annuelle des cinq Académies de l'Institut de France, le 22. Thème : " De l'information ".
- Les Orphelins (novel) / Louis Pauwels, éd. de Fallois, 1994, Grand Prix du Roman de la Ville de Paris 1995.
- 50 ans de Notre Histoire : 1945 – 1995, coll "L'aventure du XX^{e} siècle", éd. du Chêne, 1995, sous la direction d'Alain Peyrefitte.

A selection of articles to editors of Le Figaro, illustrated: Louis Pauwels, Raymond Aron, André Frossard, Jean d'Ormesson, Franz-Olivier Giesbert, Hélène Carrère d'Encausse, Jean François-Poncet, Georges Suffert...

- Lectures amoureuses de Jean-Jacques Pauvert (textes de Louis Pauwels, et autres auteurs), éd. La Musardine, 1996, re-edited 2001.
- Les Dernières Chaînes / Louis Pauwels. éd. du Rocher, Monaco, 1997. Posthumous.
- Entretiens avec Louis-Ferdinand Céline – CD " Anthologie Louis-Ferdinand Céline 1894 – 1961 " / Louis Pauwels / Albert Zbinden, ed Frémeaux et ass., 2003.
- Un jour, je me souviendrai de tout / Louis Pauwels. éd. du Rocher, 2005. Posthumous.
- Conversation entre Louis Pauwels et Dorothée Blanck la dériveuse, éd. La Soupente (pending).

== See also ==
- Jacques Bergier
- Fantastic realism (literature)
- Rémy Chauvin
- George Langelaan
- Aimé Michel
- Vril
