= Gabriel Veraldi =

Swiss writer, translator (1926–2009)

Gabriel Veraldi, real name William Schmidt (1926 in Annecy – 23 April 2009) was a Swiss French-speaking writer and translator. Veraldi is the author of several novels and essays.

== Works ==
=== Novels ===
- 1953: À la mémoire d'un ange, Éditions Gallimard NRF
- 1954: La Machine humaine, NRF (Prix Femina)
- 1956: Le Chasseur captif, NRF
- 1919: L’Affaire, Julliard Éditions Denoël
- 1966: Les Espions de bonne volonté, Denoël
- 1968: À la mémoire d'un ange
- 1969: L'Affaire

=== Essays ===
- 1958: L’Humanisme technique, La Table Ronde
- 1965: Histoire du matérialisme, Planète
- 1971: L’Inconscient pour et contre, with André Akoun, Denoël
- 1972: La Psychologie de la création, with Brigitte André, Denoël
- 1978: Guérir par l'eau
- 1981: Longévité et immortalité selon la tradition et la science, Vernoy
- 1980: Planète, Éditions du Rocher, (collection of texts)
- 1983: Le Roman d'espionnage, PUF (Que sais-je ?)
- 1988: Infant Feeding, Anatomy of a Controversy, with John Dobbing et M. McComas, Springer
- 1989: Pauwels ou le malentendu, Éditions Grasset
- 1989: Dieu est-il contre l'économie?, with Jacques Paternot
- 2000: Le Dernier Pape, with Jacques Paternot
- 2002: La Science face à l'énigme des ovnis, with Peter Sturrock
- 2006: La Conscience invisible : Le paranormal à l'épreuve de la science, with Dean Radin, Véronique Lesueur
- 2006: La Psycho-physique : vers un humanisme scientifique : Entretiens avec Gabriel Veraldi, with Marcel Odier

=== Translations ===
- 1966: Le Masque de Dimitrios by Eric Ambler
- 1978: Les Trafiquants d'armes by Eric Ambler
