= Kenneth Feder =

American archaeologist (born 1952)

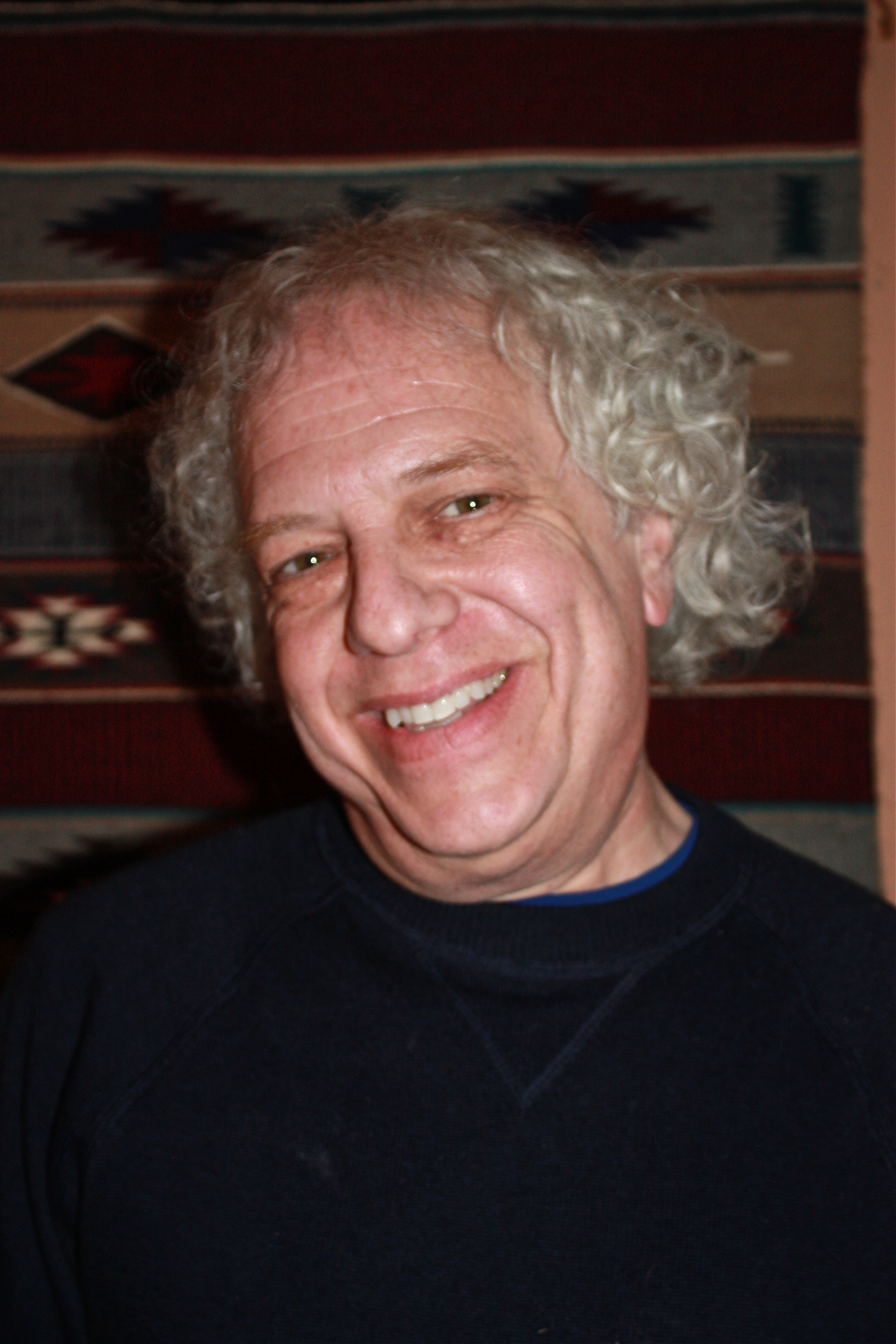
- Born: Brooklyn, NY
- Citizenship: United States of America
- Education: State University of New York at Stony Brook (BS), University of Connecticut (PhD in Anthropology)
- Known for: Author, Fellow of Committee for Skeptical Inquiry
- Scientific career
- Fields: archaeology, anthropology

Kenneth L. "Kenny" Feder is an American emeritus professor of archaeology at Central Connecticut State University and the author of several books on archaeology and criticism of pseudoarchaeology such as Frauds, Myths, and Mysteries: Science and Pseudoscience in Archaeology. His book Encyclopedia of Dubious Archaeology: From Atlantis to the Walam Olum was published in 2010. His book Ancient America: Fifty Archaeological Sites to See for Yourself was published in 2017. He is the founder and director of the Farmington River Archaeological Project.

== Early life ==
Feder was very interested in cryptozoology and ancient astronauts as a teenager, when a book called Morning of the Magicians about extraterrestrial aliens turned him on to what he describes as the nonsense in archaeology. "Essentially it was Erich von Däniken before Erich von Däniken", referring to the popular author and popularizer of ancient astronaut theories. "I knew it was crap and it got me really pissed off," Feder has stated, adding that researching the claims that were made grew his interest. According to Feder, after becoming a professor, he asked his students what they wanted to learn in the class. They expressed interest in the same things he was interested in as a teen, but he could not find a book that dealt with answers to these pseudoscience topics, which led to the writing of his first book, Frauds, Myths, and Mysteries: Science and Pseudoscience in Archaeology.

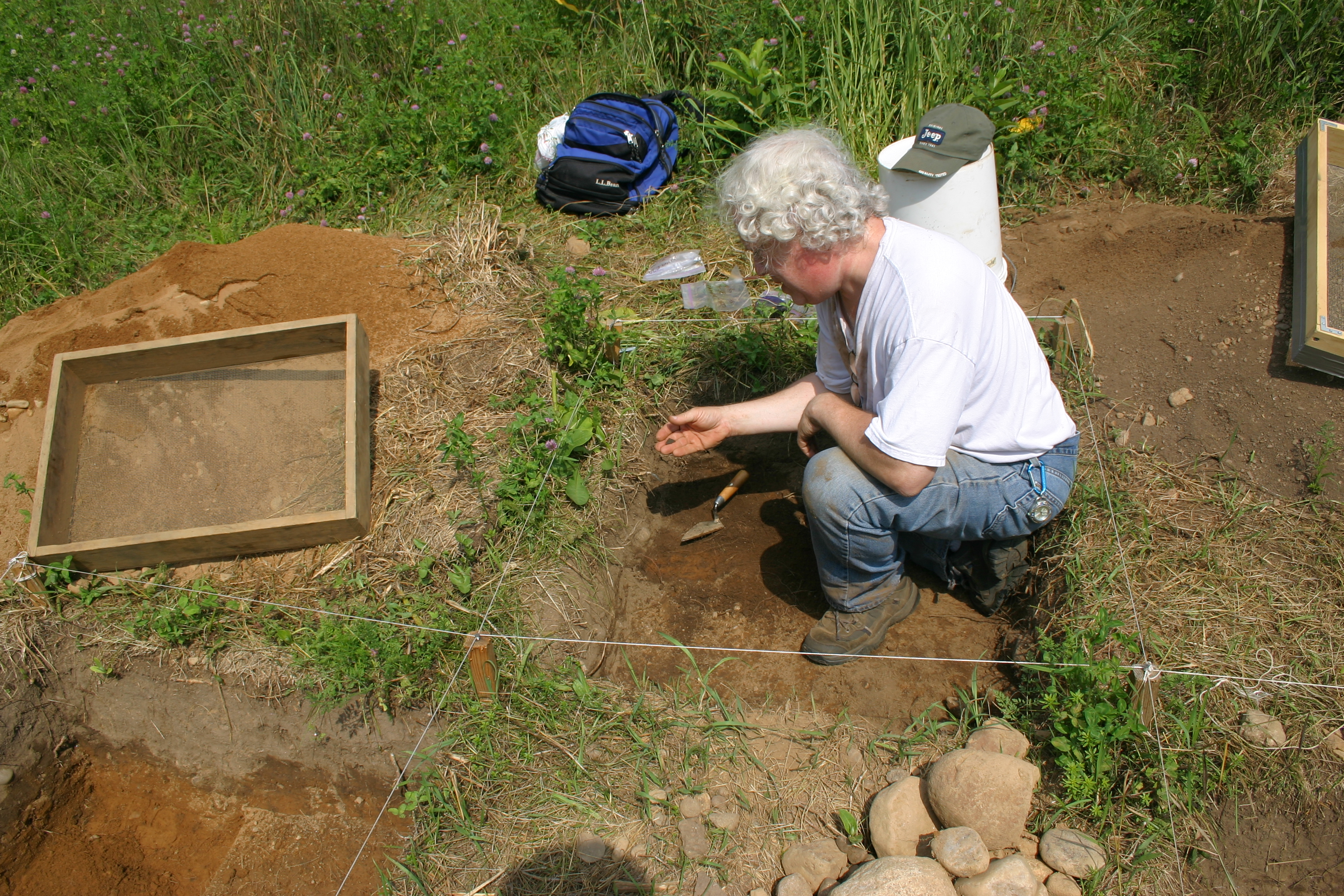
Ken Feder recovering the tip of a stone spearpoint at a 1,000-year-old archaeological site in West Simsbury, Connecticut

== Career ==
Feder is the founder and director of the Farmington River Archaeological Project which studies the prehistory of the region in northwest Connecticut.

He gained his Bachelor of Arts in Anthropology in 1973 from the State University of New York at Stony Brook, his Master of Arts in anthropology from the University of Connecticut in 1975 and his PhD in anthropology in 1982.

In 1993, Feder published an account of his archaeological investigation into a 19th-century historical site in Barkhamsted, Connecticut entitled A Village of Outcasts: Historical Archaeology and Documentary Research at the Lighthouse Site, in which he detailed a case study of a group of Native Americans, emancipated African-American slaves, and European settlers who formed a settlement that lasted from 1740 to 1860. In a review of Feder's book in American Anthropologist, Boston University's Mary Beaudry praised Feder's writing and efforts to draw attention to the settlement and "to turn [its] site report into a work of wider relevance," but also criticized the work, suggesting that "problems ensue from the perspective prehistorians often bring to historical sites," and suggesting that the field methods used in Feder's study lack the modernity of contemporary archaeological methods. Feder's concentration on the narrative of the story reconstructed by the evidence he examined at the Barkhamsted Lighthouse community site was a key aspect of his interest; of the study, Feder has stated, "That's the coolest lesson for me about the lighthouse—it's also a story about how our country is made up of not only these famous folks we always read about, but about ordinary people who do these extraordinary things living in extraordinary circumstances."

Feder's latest book is called Ancient America: Fifty Archaeological Sites to See for Yourself, based on his odyssey across the U.S. visiting all of those fifty sites. "These are places where anybody, you don’t have to be an [a]rchaeologist, can go and respond, 'Wow! That’s really impressive, that’s gorgeous, that’s all mysterious and then talk about this is what it means, this is who built these things, this is how old these places are. So it’s kind of a travel guide/time travel guide, let’s call it that.'

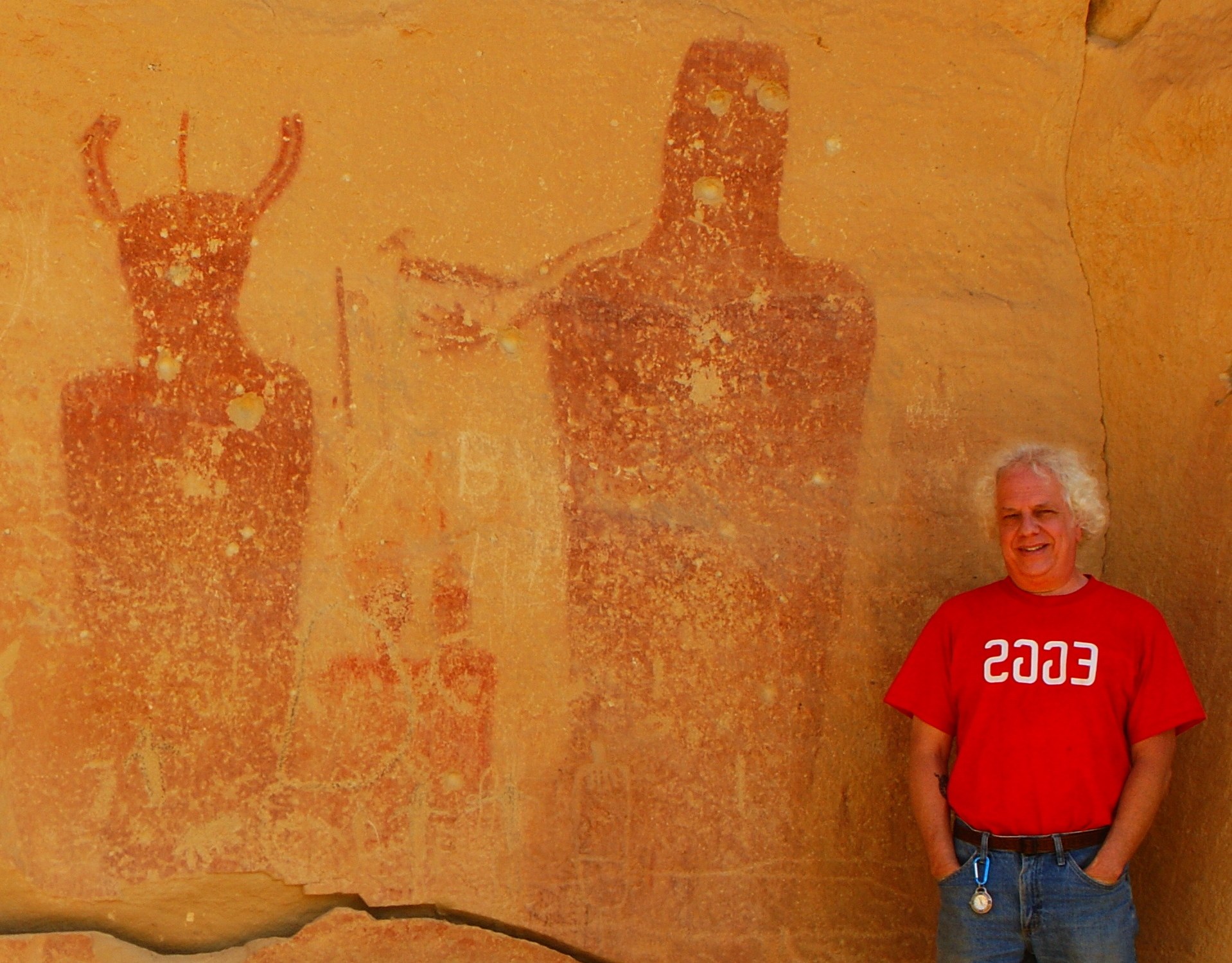
Feder stands in front of ancient pictographs at Sego Canyon in Utah.

== Skepticism ==
Feder appeared in the episode on ancient astronauts in the National Geographic Channel's Is It Real? and several episodes of the BBC documentary series Horizon discussing Atlantis and Caral. In 2004, he spoke at the World Skeptics Congress in Italy. He is also a fellow of the Committee for Skeptical Inquiry (CSI), an international organization which promotes scientific inquiry.

Feder's 1990 book Frauds, Myths, and Mysteries: Science and Pseudoscience in Archaeology attempts to explore various archaeological myths and misunderstandings by comparing phenomena that might otherwise appear unexplainable to similar occurrences and events that are scientifically documented. Gordon Stein, writing for The Skeptical Inquirer, said of Feder's analysis, "While some of these (e.g., Piltdown Man) have been covered by many previous authors, few have tried to use the tools of modern scientific archaeology to show why probability is greatly against the authenticity of the particular claim," going on to state that Feder uncovers areas "not often examined critically in the popular literature." Feder's work is used as a textbook in a number of undergraduate courses and as of 2020 is in its tenth edition.

In April 2001 Feder was consulted by a producer who was putting together a documentary about Atlantis for ABC, to follow the release of the network's parent company, Disney's, animated feature Atlantis: The Lost Empire that same year, and who was "looking for a reputable university anthropologist who was of the opinion that there is [a] historical and cultural connection between Atlantis and the native civilizations of the ancient New World." Feder issued criticism of the documentary, which he stated was "packaging a television program to look like a science documentary that [...] amounted to an infomercial for a cartoon." In the end, Feder did not contribute to the resulting documentary, Voyage to Atlantis: The Lost Empire, which aired June 10, 2001.

Discussing the Bosnian pyramid with Steven Novella, Feder stated that it does not make sense that Visočica is anything other than a natural formation. "It's all about physical evidence... ancient pyramids don't build themselves." Feder claimed that pseudoarcheologists lack the training to do a professional job evaluating items they may find.

Feder's book Encyclopedia of Dubious Archaeology addresses popular myths, by attempting to provide easily understood explanations for why some inaccuracies are perpetuated. In his book, Feder also attempts to delineate the differences between findings that are questionable from "outright frauds."

== Personal life ==
The Cardiff Giant is Feder's favorite archeological fraud. Kenneth Feder lives in Connecticut with his wife, his cats, Sedona and Dodger, and other pets. He has two sons and two daughters.

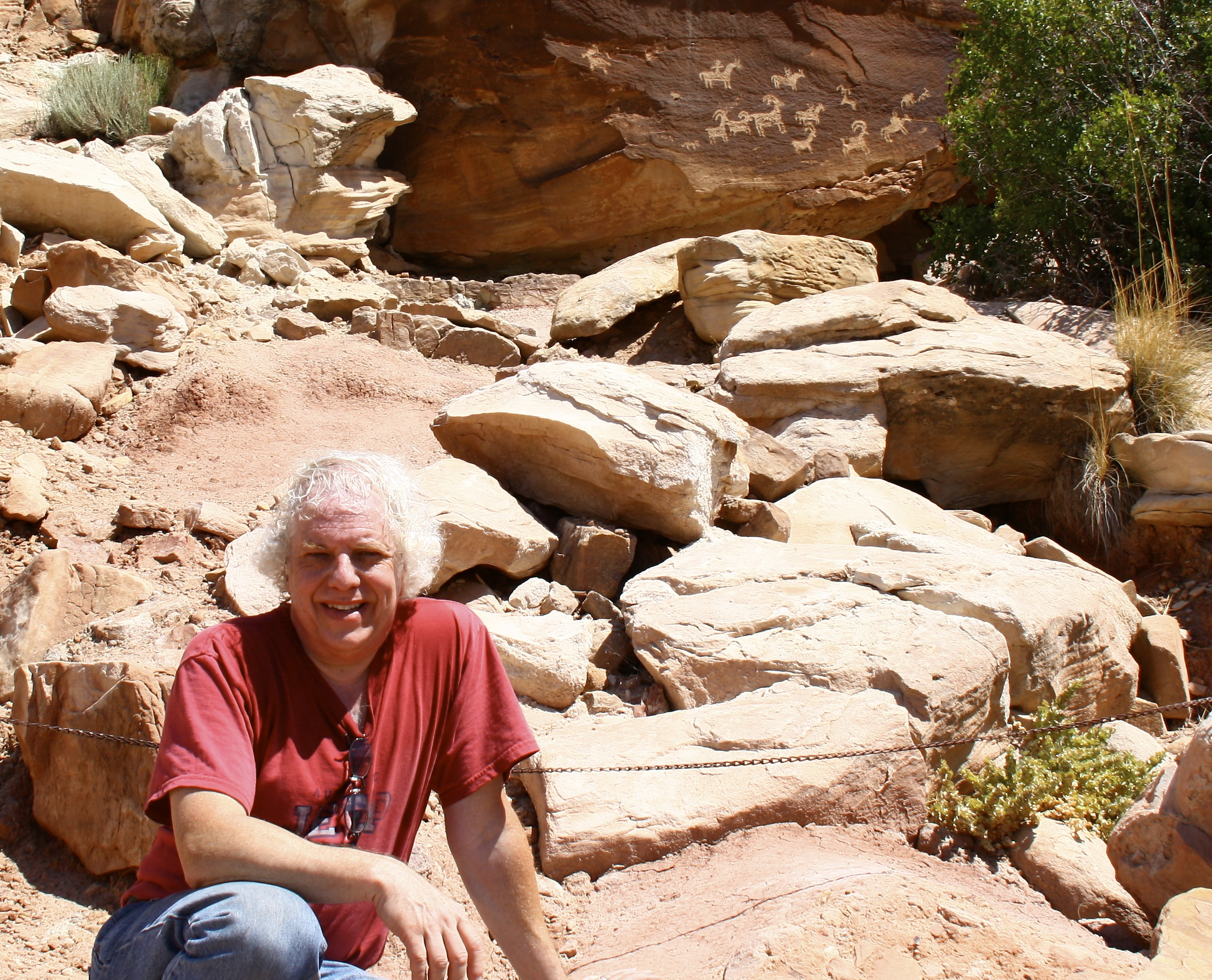
Feder sits in front of historical petroglyphs showing Native Americans on horseback using bows and arrows to hunt bighorn sheep. The petroglyph panel is located in Arches National Monument in Moab, Utah.

== Books ==
- Feder, Kenneth (1998). Lessons From the Past: An Introductory Reader in Archaeology. McGraw-Hill Humanities/Social Sciences/Languages. ISBN 978-0-7674-0453-2.
- Feder, Kenneth; Coauthor - Michael Alan Park (1989). Human Antiquity: An Introduction to Physical Anthropology and Archaeology. Mayfield Publishing. ISBN 978-0-87484-828-1.
- Feder, Kenneth (2019). Frauds, Myths, and Mysteries: Science and Pseudoscience in Archaeology 10th edition. Oxford University Press Humanities/Social Sciences/Languages. ISBN 978-0190096410.
- Feder, Kenneth (1993). A Village of Outcasts: Historical Archaeology and Documentary Research at the Lighthouse Site. Mayfield Publishing. ISBN 978-1-55934-255-1.
- Feder, Kenneth; Coauthor - David A. Poirier (2001). Dangerous Places: Health, Safety, and Archaeology. Bergin & Garvey. ISBN 978-0-89789-801-0.
- Feder, Kenneth (2006). Past in Perspective: An Introduction to Human Prehistory. Mcgraw-Hill College. ISBN 978-0-07-310770-7.
- Feder, Kenneth; Coauthor - Michael Park (2006). Human Antiquity: An Introduction to Physical Anthropology and Archaeology. McGraw-Hill. ISBN 978-0-07-304196-4.
- Feder, Kenneth (2007). Linking to the Past: A Brief Introduction to Archaeology. Oxford University Press. ISBN 978-0-19-533117-2.
- Feder, Kenneth; Coauthor - Thomas R. Hester; Coauthor - Harry J. Shafer (2009). Field Methods in Archaeology, 7th Edition. Mayfield Publishing. ISBN 978-1-59874-428-6.
- Feder, Kenneth (2010). Encyclopedia of Dubious Archaeology: From Atlantis to the Walam Olum. Greenwood Publishing Group. ISBN 978-0-313-37918-5.
- Feder, Kenneth (2016). Ancient America: Fifty Archaeological Sites to See for Yourself. Rowman & Littlefield Publishers. ISBN 978-1-4422-6312-3.
- Feder, Kenneth (2023). Native American Archaeology in the Parks: A Guide to Heritage Sites in Our National Parks and Monuments. Rowman & Littlefield. ISBN 978-1-5381-4586-9.
- Feder, Kenneth L. (2023). The Barkhamsted Lighthouse: The Archaeology of the Lighthouse Family. Rowman & Littlefield. ISBN 978-1-5381-8085-3.
- Feder, Kenneth (2025). Native America: The Story of the First Peoples. Princeton University Press. ISBN 978-0-6912-2045-1.
