= Jacques Bergier =

French chemical engineer and writer (1912–1978)

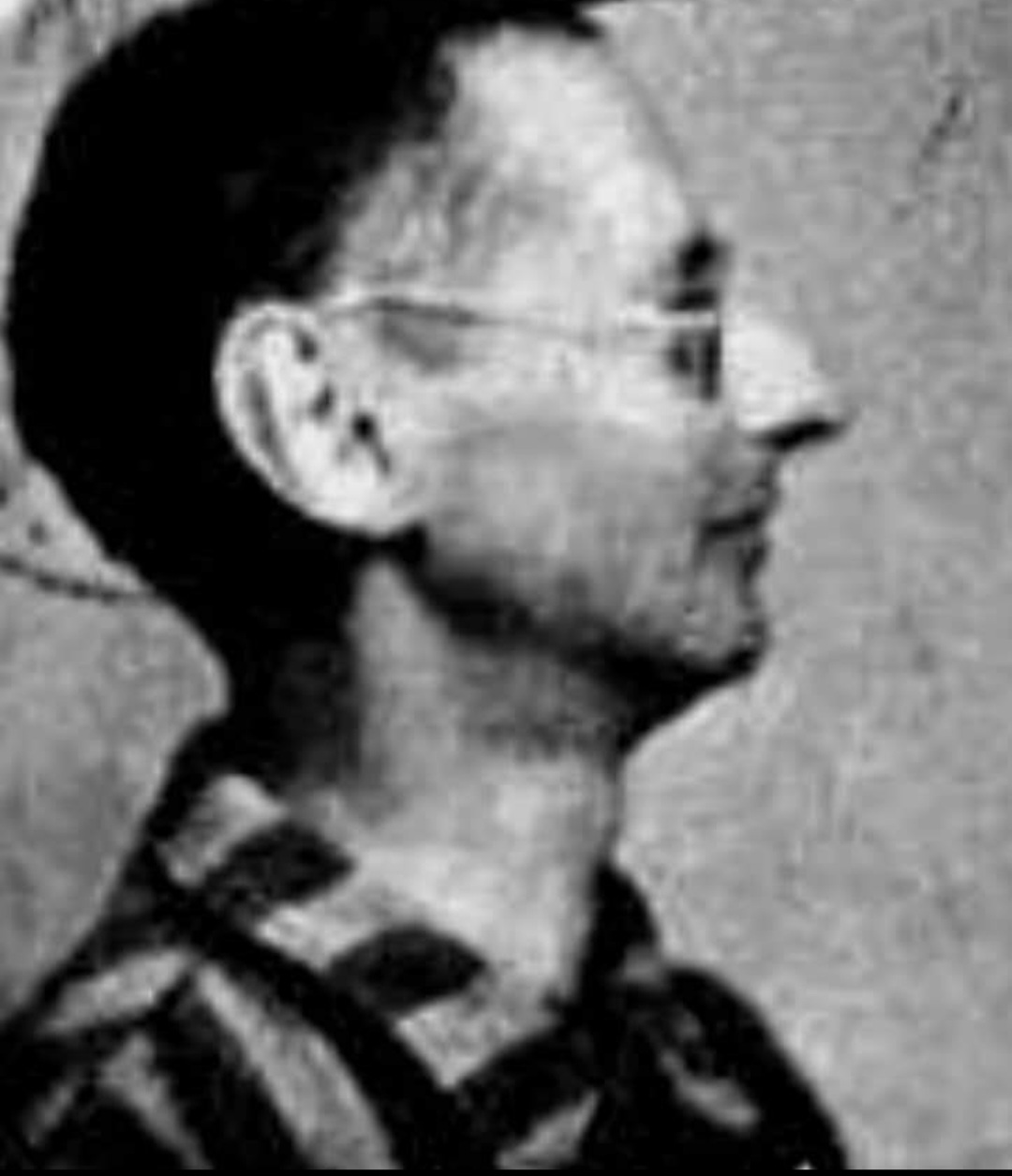
Image of Jacques Bergier

Jacques Bergier (French: [bɛʁʒje]; maybe born Yakov Moiseyevich Berger (Russian: Я́ков Моисеевич Бéргер); Odessa, 21 August [O.S. 8 August] 1912 – Paris, 23 November 1978) was a chemical engineer, member of the French resistance, spy, journalist and writer. He co-wrote the best-seller The Morning of the Magicians with Louis Pauwels as a work of "fantastic realism" (a term coined by the authors).

== Early life ==
Yakov Moiseyevich Berger, who later took the name Jacques Bergier, was born to a Jewish family in Odessa in 1912. His father, Moisey Berger, was a wholesale grocer, and his mother, Etlya Kremenetskaya, was a former revolutionary. A grand-uncle of his was a miraculous rabbi and in his autobiography, Bergier says he was a cousin of nuclear physicist George Gamow and of a certain Anatoly, a member of the firing squad that shot Tsar Nicholas II.

In his autobiography, Je ne suis pas une légende ("I am Not a Legend"), Bergier explains that his surname was a transliteration error from a Polish official that turned "Berger" into "Bergier" (in Russian "er" is voiced as "ye"). Jacques is the French equivalent of "Yakov" in both Russian and Yiddish.

He was a gifted child: in his autobiography he said that at age two he read his first newspaper and at four he could easily read Russian, French and Hebrew. He considered himself a speed reader and had an eidetic memory. He was a vivacious child, and told stories of discussing strategy with generals as well as talking with a wide spectrum of people, from prostitutes to political activists and businessmen in the streets of Odessa. He never went to school but had private tutors.

In 1920 the Russian Civil War forced the Berger family to take refuge in Etlia's homeland in Krzemeiniec, that became Polish. Young Yakov went to a Talmudic school and he became enthralled with the study of the Kabbalah and its mysteries. Besides that he studied mathematics, physics, German and English. He read everything he could lay hands on, but his favourite reading was science fiction.

In 1925 the family moved to France. He was a pupil at the Lycée Saint Louis, then he studied mathematics, applied and general chemistry at the Sorbonne and finally he went to the École Nationale Supérieure de Chimie, where he graduated as chemical engineer.

From 1934 to 1939 he was an assistant to the noted French atomic physicist André Helbronner who was killed by the Gestapo towards the end of World War II. According to Walter Lang, Bergier was approached by Fulcanelli with a message for Helbronner about man's possible use of nuclear weapons. The meeting took place in June 1937 in a laboratory of the Gas Board in Paris.

During the Second World War and the German occupation of France, Bergier worked for the Réseau Marco-Polo at Lyon, a French Resistance network in contact with the supporters of Charles De Gaulle in London. From March 1944 until May 1945, Bergier was incarcerated in the Mauthausen-Gusen concentration camp.

== Work ==
In 1954 Bergier met Louis Pauwels, a writer and editor, in Paris. They would later collaborate on the book Le Matin des Magiciens, which was published in France in 1960. This book takes the reader on a neo-surrealistic tour of modern European history focusing on the purported influence of the occult and secret societies on politics. It also attempts to connect alchemy with nuclear physics, hinting that early alchemists understood more about the actual function of atoms than they are credited.

Le Matin des Magiciens was very popular with the youth culture in France through the 1960s and 1970s. It was translated into English by Rollo Myers in 1963 under the title The Dawn of Magic. It first appeared in the United States in paperback form in 1968 as The Morning of the Magicians. This book spawned an entire genre of explorations into many of the ideas it raised, such as connections between Nazism and the occult. It has become a cult classic, often referenced by conspiracy theory enthusiasts and those interested in ideas of forbidden history and occult studies.

Pauwels and Bergier collaborated on two later books of essays, Impossible Possibilities and The Eternal Man. They also co-produced a journal called Planète which explored esoteric ideas. Bergier was interested in the possibilities of extraterrestrial life and explored reported sightings of UFOs. In 1970 he published Les extra-terrestres dans l'Histoire (The extraterrestrials in history).

Jacques Bergier died in November 1978 saying of himself: "I am not a legend."

== Popular culture ==
Bergier was the inspiration for Hergé's character Mik Kanrokitoff, featured in The Adventures of Tintin, Flight 714 to Sydney.

== See also ==
- Vril
