= Frauds, Myths, and Mysteries =

Book by Kenneth L. Feder

- 11th edition cover
- Author: Kenneth L. Feder
- Language: English
- Subjects: Science, Archaeology, Pseudoarchaeology, pseudoscience, skepticism, quackery
- Publisher: Oxford University Press
- Publication date: 1990
- Publication place: United States
- Media type: Print (Paperback)
- Pages: 332
- ISBN: 9780197757796
- Text: Frauds, Myths, and Mysteries at Internet Archive

Frauds, Myths, and Mysteries: Science and Pseudoscience in Archaeology is a book by Kenneth L. Feder on the topic of pseudoarchaeology. Feder is an emeritus professor of anthropology at Central Connecticut State University.

Frauds, Myths, and Mysteries takes a skeptical look at the many false claims in the field of archaeology and promotes the use of the scientific method to evaluate such claims. It follows in the tradition of Martin Gardner's Fads and Fallacies in the Name of Science. The author attempts to engage the reader through humor and personal anecdotes. The book is intended for both general consumption and as a textbook for archaeology courses. It was originally published in 1990, and in 2025 the 11th edition was published.

== Contents and synopsis of the 11th edition ==
=== Preface ===
In the preface, the author discusses how there came to be 11 editions, lists what's new in this edition, describes the special features of the book, makes acknowledgements, and provides info about the cover photo.

=== My pseudoscience cheat sheet ===
Feder presents a concise skeptical framework to aid in evaluating archaeological claims.

=== Chapter 1, Science and Pseudoscience ===
The prevalence of belief in paranormal and pseudoscientific ideas and conspiracy theories abound: ghosts, the lost continent of Atlantis, alien visitors in the ancient past, telekinesis, bigfoot, Moon landing conspiracy theories, etc. Feder confesses that at one time he was inclined to believe that some of these ideas might be true and he discusses how his thinking evolved through experimentation and by finding serious errors in the claims made by the proponents. Regarding his reason for writing the book he states "I am very simply passionately curious about human antiquity, and I enjoy few things as much as sharing that passion through my teaching and publications, including this book... I find the misrepresentation of what we actually know about that past to be genuinely aggravating and attempt in these pages to respond to some of the more egregious examples." He names fame, money, racism, nationalism and religion (e.g., claims for the discovery of Noah's Ark) as some of the reasons for promoting these misrepresentations.

=== Chapter 2, Epistemology: How You Know What You Know ===
The scientific method is how science works and this chapter emphasizes this by discussing how science is constantly evolving, improving, and sometimes overturning old results. Feder discusses the problem of confirmation bias, the natural tendency to only see evidence that supports a hypothesis that you are trying to prove, while discounting or ignoring evidence that contradicts it. He discusses the problem with the old saying "absence of evidence is not evidence of absence" (Argument from ignorance). He emphasizes the crucial importance of creativity and imagination as part of the scientific process in order to come up with possible explanations for things that are currently not understood. New hypotheses must be rigorously tested, and if they fail, rejected. He emphasizes that skepticism is an essential part of the scientific method. He gives a list of books that apply skepticism to widely held pseudoscientific ideas.

=== Chapter 3, GIANTS! Anatomy of an Archaeological Hoax ===
Some claim that giants once lived on the earth like Goliath of the Bible. Feder describes in detail the case of "the Cardiff Giant", a hoax that involved the "discovery" of a petrified stone giant in 1869. The hoax was a moneymaking success for some time until it was proven that the giant had been carved from stone and buried where it was later "found." He also discusses a similar fraud at Pachaug State Forest.

=== Chapter 4, Dawson’s Dawn Man: The Hoax at Piltdown ===
In 1912 there was the "discovery" of a supposed missing link in human evolution known as the Piltdown Man or Dawson's Dawn Man. Regarding this famous hoax, Feder notes it consisted of a modern human-like cranium and a primitive ape-like jaw. Human ancestors were actually the opposite - having an ape-like cranium perched atop the post-cranial skeleton of a creature who walked upright, like modern human beings. But the fake appeared to be consistent with some mistaken nineteenth and twentieth century ideas about how humans evolved. It remains an open question as to who created the fake, though Charles Dawson for whom the specimen is named is at the heart of the story.

=== Chapter 5, Who Discovered America? ===
Christopher Columbus did not "discover" America. It had already been discovered some 20 to 30 thousand years earlier and was, at the time he arrived, inhabited by tens of millions of people. Feder discusses Columbus' voyages and his reluctance to believe that the lands he arrived at were not part of Asia. Public opinion at the time was biased by biblical passages about the sons of Noah populating the earth and about the lost tribes of Israel. Feder discusses the successful prediction of a land bridge to Asia during the last ice age and evidence that the American Indians were in fact descended from Asians.

=== Chapter 6, Who’s Next? After the Indigenous Peoples, before Columbus ===
There have been various false claims about early voyages to America including by Jews, Africans, and Irish monks. Feder notes that in some cases these claims were promoted with fake artifacts bearing inscriptions or other characteristics representative of the corresponding culture. In other cases genuine artifacts were incorrectly claimed to show characteristics of that culture. He then proceeds to discuss the one proven claim: that the Vikings made voyages to Greenland and from there, in the late 10th century, to Vinland (now Newfoundland, Canada). There are also dubious claims that the Vikings traveled further south into parts of what is now the United States.

Feder emphasizes the importance of verifying claims by finding good and abundant evidence: remains of dwellings, artwork, and tools as well as the skeletal remains of ancient visitors. He discusses the importance of validating any particular artifact that seems to strongly indicate the presence of a certain culture with "archaeological context." As Feder puts it: "the material remains produced by each culture are recognizable and, at the same time, recognizably different from the material remains produced by every other culture." Normally lots of material is found at a proposed site and it should be consistent with the culture of the proposed visitors. The lack of this material is a strong indicator that the proposed culture did not exist at that site.

In this edition he discusses in detail QAnon violence to America's Stonehenge.

=== Chapter 7, The Myth of the Mound Builders ===
The people known as the Mound Builders lived in America prior to the arrival of Christopher Columbus. They had an advanced society with impressive art and agriculture and built enormous earthen mounds that were comparable in size to some of the Egyptian pyramids. Feder calls them "one of the best kept secrets in American history." The early attempts by archaeologists to understand them were greatly hampered by the mistaken and racist idea that the mound builders were too advanced to possibly be related to the Native Americans. There were also numerous "artifacts" that were used to promote the idea that these people came here from Europe or the Middle East hundreds of years before Columbus. These artifacts turned out to be fakes, and it was eventually proven that the mound builders were, in fact, the Native Americans.

=== Chapter 8, Lost: One Continent—Reward ===
The classic myth of Atlantis, starting with its origin more than 2000 years ago in the dialogs of the Greek philosopher Plato, described Atlantis as a great and powerful nation that was defeated in a war with the much weaker, but morally superior, Athens. After this, Atlantis was completely destroyed in a great calamity and disappeared without a trace. Feder lists about a dozen hypotheses about where Atlantis was located, none of which have any real evidence to support them. Feder presents a compelling argument that Plato's story was just that, a story, which was used as a device to make a philosophical argument. He discusses the lack of any real evidence of the existence of this supposed lost civilization and goes into detail about the many popular ideas that have been brought forth over the years. These include claims that Atlantis was the first true civilization and all other civilizations around the world appeared through diffusion from Atlantis, claims that the people of Atlantis had special psychic powers including the ability to move things remotely, and claims that many people have inherent knowledge of Atlantis because they lived there in a past life.

=== Chapter 9, Atlantis 2.0: Comets, and Glaciers, and Floods, Oh My ===
This chapter is about the search for lost civilizations. After a brief discussion of Helene Blavatsky and Edgar Cayce. Feder moves on to Graham Hancock, commenting that "The lost civilization trope goes on and on like the Energizer Bunny." He bases most of the discussion on the Netflix series Ancient Apocalypse which he views as an updating of Hancock's book Fingerprints of the Gods. Hancock, Feder says, argues for a civilization that was far advanced from other hunter-gatherers in its architecture, astronomy, mathematics, engineering, etc, including the possession of a calendar. This was destroyed by what was possibly a comet, with no evidence yet found for its existence. Some survivors reached Egypt, Southeast Asia, Mexico, Malta and North America, teaching the populations their skills. These survivors were integrated into the myths of these cultures as gods. In his book, but not in the Netflix series, these were white gods.

Feder repeats his earlier statement that "the gold standard in archaeological research is... the stuff left behind that uniquely characterizes a particular culture." Hancock shows none. Feder also discusses Hancock's claims that his alleged civilization was wiped out by a comet or asteroid impact as discussed in the Younger Dryas impact hypothesis, noting that evidence of non-advanced cultures has been found.

Hancock argues that archaeologists are resistant to new ideas. Feder points out that in two episodes of the Netflix series Hancock says that "mainstream archaeologists don't like to acknowledge Hancock's view that the Serpent Mound in Ohio is astronomically aligned. But visitor signage clearly describes some astronomical alignments and a 1998 publication by Brad Lepper also described them.

=== Chapter 10, Prehistoric E.T.: The Fantasy of Ancient Astronauts ===
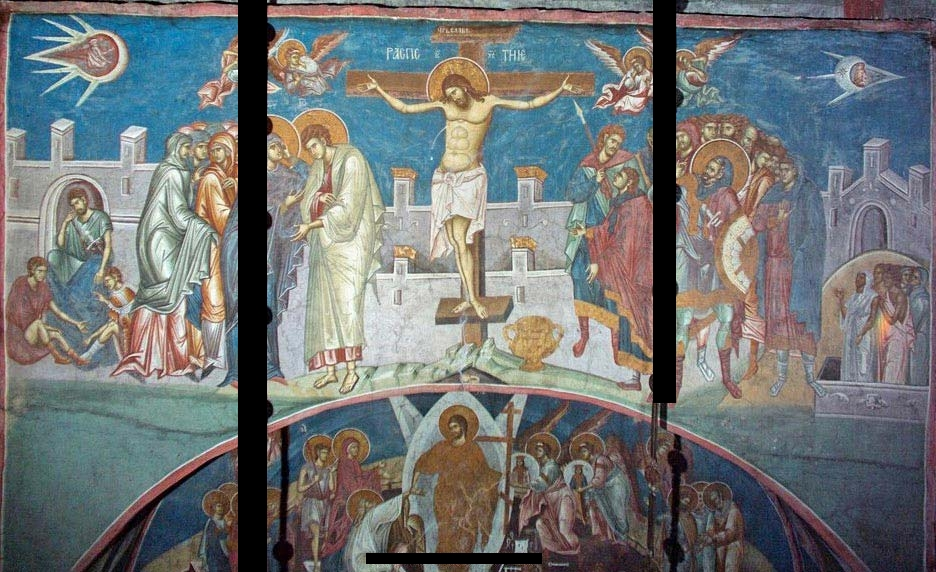
Fresco in the Visoki Dečani Monastery

It's been suggested that aliens from outer space visited the earth several thousand years ago and taught or helped humans to construct some of the great monuments of antiquity such as the Egyptian pyramids. Aliens also supposedly taught humans about agriculture, ceramics, metallurgy, writing and everything else that is of importance to a civilization. The main argument seems to be that humans were too dumb to have figured this stuff out on their own. Feder discusses Erich von Däniken, who produced a long series of books, beginning in 1970 with Chariots of the Gods?. Von Däniken's "evidence" includes his interpretation of some ancient rock art (petroglyphs) as depicting aliens, astronauts, and space ships. Feder points out that there are quite reasonable interpretations that don't involve aliens. Von Däniken also makes the claim that the aliens had sex with human females who then produced intelligent offspring with alien genes. Then there was the long running TV series Ancient Aliens with Giorgio Tsoukalos. Again, a lot of claims are made, with no real evidence to back them up.

Feder notes that multiple supporters of the existence of UFOs and UAPs (Unidentified Anomalous Phenomena) see these in Middle Age and Renaissance paintings. They see flying saucers traversing the sky with people in them. In fact this illustrates a well known tradition of Apollo (the sun) and Diana, (the moon), flying across the sky.

=== Chapter 11, OK, So How Did People Get So Smart? ===
There have been massive construction projects developed by ancient societies, some taking decades to complete with a dedicated workforce of thousands. Dating to about 11,600 years ago, the massive stone pillars at Göbekli Tepe in southeastern Turkey, with intricate carvings of animals, is one of the first to provide evidence of monumental architecture. Feder stresses that it is a testament to human intelligence and ingenuity, not evidence of help from some advanced civilization. Feder also discusses the massive stone statues called the Moai on Easter Island, and the Mesoamerican and Egyptian pyramids. He discusses the evidence that these cultures developed their building skills over hundreds of years and that, in many cases, modern day archaeologists have been able to demonstrate how these building tasks could be accomplished without modern equipment. This edition also discusses the so-called Altar Stone weighing about 6,000 kg and near the middle of Stonehenge. The stone has never been considered an altar but is unusual in two ways. Unlike the other stones it is lying down and is thought to have always been recumbent. Also, it is made up of a material unlike the other stones. It is thought to have come from Scotland, over 750km from Stonehenge.

=== Chapter 12, Good Vibrations: Psychics and Archaeology ===
Some people claim to have psychic powers that can allow them to make archaeological discoveries. Some claim they can use dowsing rods to locate buried artifacts. Others claim to simply know where to look and some claim that they can communicate with the long dead inhabitants of a site or that they can describe someone who once owned an artifact. Feder points out that there are logical places to look for artifacts because people like to live near a water source, with available food and shelter, etc. and thus no psychic ability is required to find likely places to dig. He goes on to describe his personal interactions with self-proclaimed psychics and his testing of their claims. He also discusses real technology that exists which can help locate archaeological sites and buried structures without actually digging, such as Lidar, ground-penetrating radar, and magnetometry using a fluxgate gradiometer.

=== Chapter 13, Old-Time Religion, New Age Visions, and Paranormal Predictions ===
Creationism is the insistence that biblical creation stories are facts, so that humans and animals were created in their current forms just a few thousand years ago rather than evolving slowly over millions of years. Feder discusses how the pseudoscience called scientific creationism (later called intelligent design) emerged in an effort to provide an alternative to evolution which could be taught in schools. Feder also discusses Noah's Ark, particularly the numerous unsubstantiated claims that it was found, and the supposed evidence for the great flood. He also points out that within the laws of science, the ark could not be built nor could it accomplish the required task.

In this chapter Feder also discusses New Age claims about certain archaeological sites emanating magic and power. He also discusses the crystal skulls which are supposed to have magical properties, which he states have been shown to be fakes. These were the subject of an Indiana Jones movie in which they were supposed to be of alien origin.

In this edition he discusses Shaligrams and the work of Holly Walters, a cultural anthropologist. Shaligrams, he says, from the perspective of paleontology are fossilized ammonites found in Nepal, but from a religious perspective are sacred images of Vishnu or other deities, each unique in biography and meaning. Their devotees categorize them into about 92 empirically defined categories. Devotees collect them and bring them home to worship, viewing them as both naturally created ancient fossils and as having a sacred essence.

=== Chapter 14 Epilogue: A Past We Deserve ===
With examples from the past and present, Feder shows how peoples' attitudes about archaeological sites being "spooky" is promoted by books and movies which tend to focus on the pseudoscience that the public already tends to believe in. Fiction is more entertaining than fact.

== Reception ==
The book has generally received favorable reviews. In a recent review, Jacob J. Sauer of Vanderbilt University says "There is no other book I would recommend more to colleagues--or to anybody interested in learning more about archaeological myths and mysteries." Many reviewers commented favorably on the book's emphasis on using the scientific method. In his review of the 2nd edition, F. Donald Pate says "I recommend this book to both professional archaeologists and the general public. It does a fabulous job of educating the public regarding a systematic scientific approach to archaeological problems, and offers alternative explanations for a range of popular frauds and myths relating to the human past." The 1st edition of the book was not specifically intended as a textbook but soon came to be used as such. One reviewer of the 1st edition states "The book should both be of general interest and prove useful as a supplemental text for introductory archaeology courses." As a result, new features were added in later editions to facilitate its uses as a textbook. The book has been required reading in some archaeology courses. Bettina Arnold, a professor of anthropology at the University of Wisconsin–Milwaukee, writes that this book "has influenced thousands of undergraduates in introductory courses across the country (and presumably overseas as well), a significant contribution to the everlasting struggle to maintain some control over how professional archaeology is perceived by the general public." One reviewer, who was otherwise quite positive, found Feder's occasional use of sarcasm somewhat "off-putting," such as where he states in regards to claims about Noah's ark being scientifically feasible, "Obviously, a 30-ton, 40-foot-tall, 100-foot-long Supersaurus would have been more than a little cramped in its quarters." Some reviewers however see Feder's humor as a plus. For example, Heather Rockwell of University of Wyoming says "Feder's sardonic wit, amusing personal anecdotes, and rigorous attention to detail makes it essential reading for the aspiring archaeologist."

== See also ==
- Pseudoarchaeology
- Ronald H. Fritze
