= Patrice de Plunkett =

French journalist and essayist (born 1947)

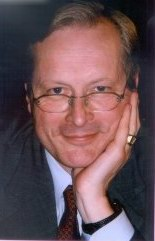
Patrice de Plunkett, French journalist and essayist

Patrice de Plunkett (born 9 January 1947 in Paris) is a French journalist and essayist who specializes in analyzing social issues. He was the editor of Le Figaro Magazine, one of the major French weekly magazines. After leaving this magazine in 1997, he has written a number of books.

In 1983, he received the Renaissance Award for Letters from the Le Cercle Renaissance. He also received the Award of History of Institutions and of Social Events from the Faculty of Law of the University of Paris.

== Life ==
While he obtained a licenture in Law, Patrice de Plunkett's professional life has focused on journalism. He first worked in the weekly magazine Valeurs actuelles in 1972. At present he writes editorials for a monthly magazine of the same editorial group, Valmonde.

Patrice once fought Christianity. During the student revolutions of 1968, he broke away from the Christian faith.

In 1979, he became the editor-in-chief of the newly created Le Figaro Magazine, which remained close to the Nouvelle Droite until 1981.

He broke away from atheism in 1980, and converted to Catholicism in 1985, after having gone on a trip to Israel, especially to the places where Jesus lived. Another influence was a visit to a Benedictine monastery.

His expertise is in analyzing social questions, especially those of a socio-economic vein. He received the Award of History of Institutions and of Social Events from the Faculty of Law of the University of Paris.

He has written about Benedict XVI and Opus Dei. On account of the Da Vinci Code, he has been giving interviews about Opus Dei on TV, radio, and to the press.

Patrice de Plunkett is a member of the editorial committee of the Catholic review Kephas. He is also a member of the Order of the Holy Sepulchre.

== Works ==
For his book, La Culture en veston rose ISBN 2-7103-0123-7, he received the Renaissance Award in 1983.

After his departure from Le Figaro Magazine in 1997, he has written a number of books:

- Ça donne envie de faire la révolution !, Paris, Plon, 1998. ISBN 2-259-18857-5
- Quelle spiritualité pour le XXIe siècle ?, Paris, Éd. 1, "Les grandes conférences du Figaro", 1998.
- L'Evangile face aux médias, Paris, Edifa, 2000.
- Benoît XVI et le plan de Dieu, Paris, Presses de la Renaissance, 2005.
- L'Opus Dei : enquête sur le "monstre", Paris, Presses de la Renaissance, 2006.
- Nous sommes des animaux mais on n'est pas des bêtes, Paris, Presses de la Renaissance, mai 2007.

== References and external links ==
- Patrice de Plunkett : le Blog ("un bloc-notes de journaliste")
- Short French Biography from his blog
- Biography at Who's who
- revue Kephas
- Opus Dei: Zenit News Agency (Rome)]
- site Génération Benoît XVI
- Christicity.com
- Librairiecatholique.com
