= Erich von Däniken =

Swiss writer (1935–2026)

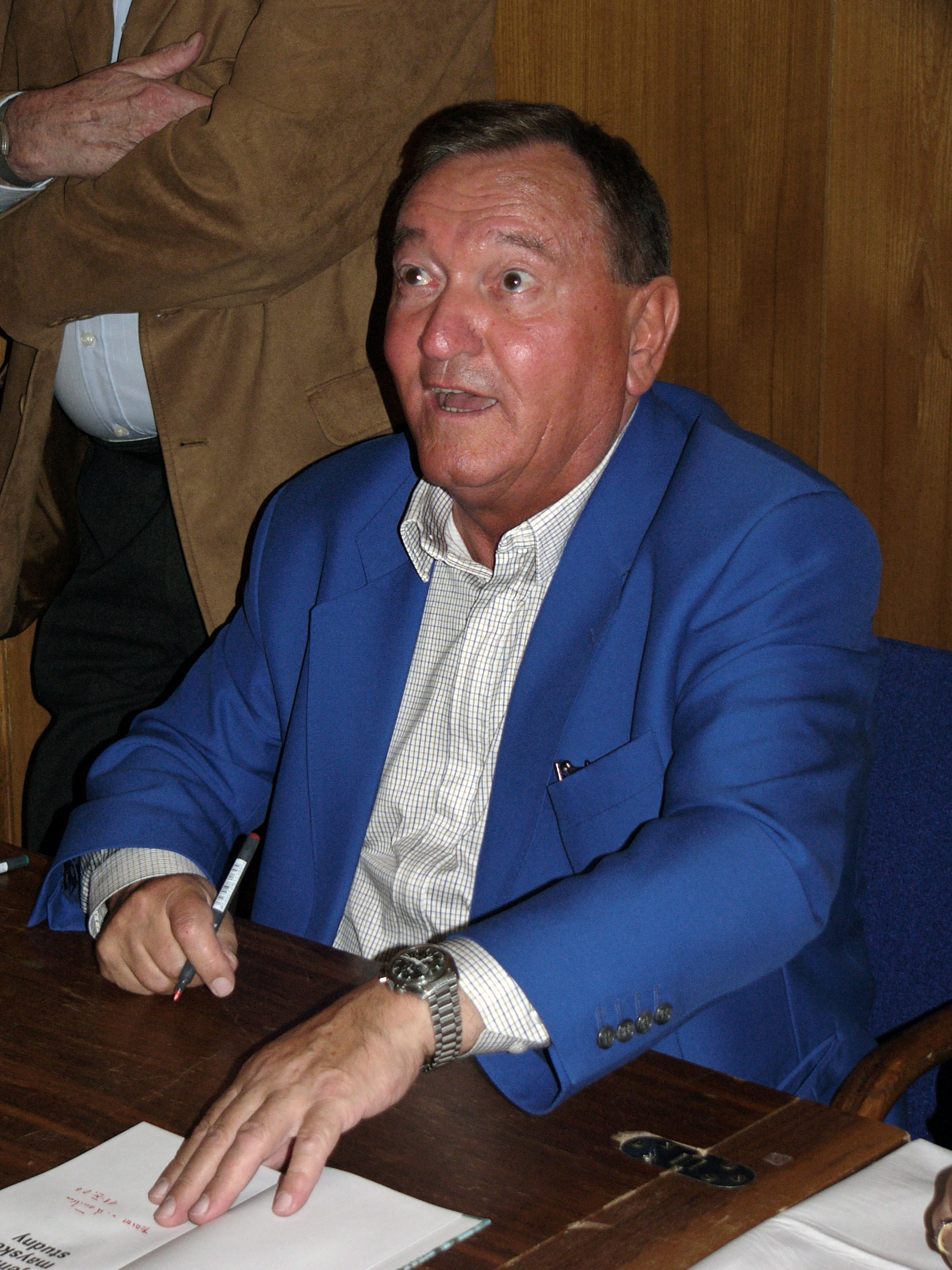
- Däniken in 2006
- Born: Erich Anton Paul von Däniken; 14 April 1935; Zofingen, Aargau, Switzerland
- Died: 10 January 2026 (aged 90); Unterseen, Switzerland
- Occupation: Author
- Known for: Ancient astronauts
- Notable work: Chariots of the Gods?

Erich Anton Paul von Däniken (/ˈɛrɪk fɒn ˈdɛnɪkən/; German: [ˈeːrɪç fɔn ˈdɛːnɪkən]; 14 April 1935 – 10 January 2026) was a Swiss author of several pseudoscientific books which made claims about extraterrestrial influences on early human culture, including the best-selling Chariots of the Gods?, published in 1968. Däniken was one of the main figures responsible for popularizing the "paleo-contact" and ancient astronauts hypotheses.

The ideas put forth in his books are rejected by virtually all scientists and academics, who categorize his work as pseudohistory, pseudoarchaeology, and pseudoscience. Early in his career, he was convicted and served time for several counts of fraud or embezzlement, and wrote one of his books in prison.

Däniken was the co-founder of the Archaeology, Astronautics and SETI Research Association (AAS RA). He designed Mystery Park, a theme park located in Interlaken, Switzerland, that opened in May 2003.

== Early life ==
Däniken was born in Zofingen, Aargau. Brought up as a Roman Catholic, he attended the Saint-Michel International Catholic School in Fribourg, Switzerland. During his time at the school he rejected the church's interpretations of the Bible and developed an interest in astronomy and flying saucers. At the age of 19, he was given a four-month suspended sentence for theft. He left the school and was apprenticed to a Swiss hotelier for a time, before moving to Egypt. In December 1964, Däniken wrote Hatten unsere Vorfahren Besuch aus dem Weltraum? ("Were Our Ancestors Visited by Extraterrestrials?" [lit. "Did our ancestors have visitation from space?"]) for the German-Canadian periodical Der Nordwesten. While in Egypt, he was involved in a jewelry deal which resulted in a nine-month conviction for fraud and embezzlement upon his return to Switzerland.

Following his release, Däniken became a manager of the Hotel Rosenhügel in Davos, Switzerland, during which time he wrote Chariots of the Gods? (German: Erinnerungen an die Zukunft, literally "Memories of the Future"), working on the manuscript late at night after the hotel's guests had retired. The draft of the book was turned down by several publishers. Econ Verlag (now part of Ullstein Verlag) was willing to publish the book after a complete reworking by a professional author, Utz Utermann, who used the pseudonym of Wilhelm Roggersdorf. Utermann was a former editor of the Nazi Party's newspaper Völkischer Beobachter and had been a Nazi bestselling author. The re-write of Chariots of the Gods? was accepted for publication early in 1967, but not printed until March 1968. Against all expectations, the book gained widespread interest and became a bestseller. Däniken was paid 7 percent of the book's turnover, while 3 percent went to Utermann. In 1970, Der Spiegel referred to the hype over Däniken as Dänikitis.

In November 1968, Däniken was arrested for fraud, after falsifying hotel records and credit references in order to take out loans for $130,000 over a period of twelve years. He used the money for foreign travel to research his book. Two years later, Däniken was convicted for "repeated and sustained" embezzlement, fraud, and forgery, with the court ruling that the writer had been living a "playboy" lifestyle. He unsuccessfully entered a plea of nullity, on the grounds that his intentions were not malicious and that the credit institutions were at fault for failing adequately to research his references, and on 13 February 1970 he was sentenced to three and a half years imprisonment and was also fined 3,000 francs. He served one year of this sentence before being released.

His first book, Chariots of the Gods?, had been published by the time of his trial, and its sales allowed him to repay his debts and leave the hotel business. Däniken wrote his second book, Gods from Outer Space, while in prison.

== Claims of alien influence on Earth ==
The general claim of Däniken over several published books, starting with Chariots of the Gods? in 1968, is that extraterrestrials or "ancient astronauts" visited Earth and influenced early human culture. Däniken wrote about his belief that structures such as the Egyptian pyramids, Stonehenge, and the Moai of Easter Island, and certain artifacts from that period, are products of higher technological knowledge than is presumed to have existed at the times they were manufactured. He also describes ancient artwork throughout the world as containing depictions of astronauts, air and space vehicles, extraterrestrials, and complex technology. Däniken explains the origins of religions as reactions to contact with an alien race, and offers interpretations of sections of the Old Testament of the Bible.

=== Criticism ===
In 1966, when Däniken was writing his first book, scientists Carl Sagan and I. S. Shklovskii had written about the possibility of paleocontact and extraterrestrial visitation claims in one chapter of their book Intelligent Life in the Universe, leading author Ronald Story to speculate in his book The Space Gods Revealed that this may have been the genesis of Däniken's ideas. Many ideas from this book appeared in different form in Däniken's books.

Prior to Däniken's work, other authors had presented ideas of extraterrestrial contacts. He failed to credit these authors properly or at all, even when making the same claims using similar or identical evidence. The first edition of Däniken's Erinnerungen an die Zukunft failed to cite Robert Charroux's One Hundred Thousand Years of Man's Unknown History despite making very similar claims, and publisher Econ-Verlag was forced to add Charroux in the bibliography in later editions, to avoid a possible lawsuit for plagiarism.

==== Logical and factual errors ====
That writing as careless as Däniken's, whose principal thesis is that our ancestors were dummies, should be so popular is a sober commentary on the credulousness and despair of our times. I also hope for the continuing popularity of books like Chariots of the Gods? in high school and college logic courses, as object lessons in sloppy thinking. I know of no recent books so riddled with logical and factual errors as the works of Däniken.

— Carl Sagan, Foreword to The Space Gods Revealed

===== Iron pillar of Delhi =====
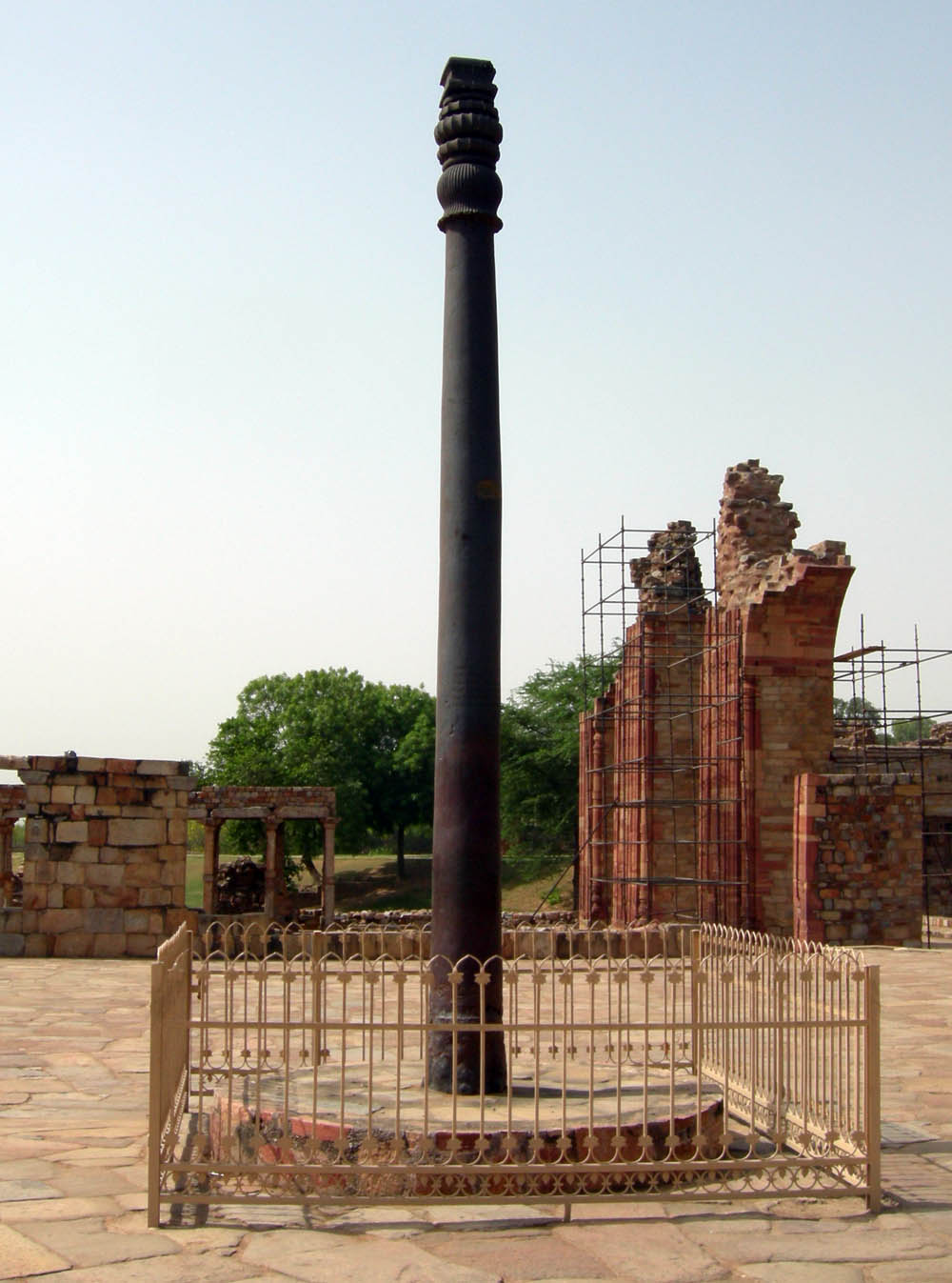
The iron pillar of Delhi, erected by Chandragupta II the Great

In Chariots of the Gods?, Däniken cited the iron pillar of Delhi in India, erected approximately 402 AD, as a prime example of extraterrestrial influence because of its "unknown origins" and a complete absence of rust despite its estimated 1,500 years of continuous exposure to the elements. When informed by an interviewer in 1974 that the origin of the pillar, its method of construction and relative resistance to corrosion were all well understood, Däniken responded that he no longer believed extraterrestrials had been involved in its creation.

===== Cueva de los Tayos =====
In The Gold of the Gods, Däniken described an expedition he claimed to have undertaken through man-made tunnels within Cueva de los Tayos, a natural cave system in Ecuador, guided by the Hungarian-born Argentine explorer Juan Moricz. He reported seeing mounds of gold, strange statues, and a library containing metal tablets, all of which he considered to be evidence of ancient extraterrestrial visitation.

Moricz told Der Spiegel that there had been no expedition; Däniken's descriptions came from "a long conversation", and the photos in the book had been "fiddled". During the 1974 interview, Däniken asserted that he had indeed seen the library and the artifacts in the tunnels, but he had embellished some aspects of the story to make it more interesting:

"In German we say a writer, if he is not writing pure science, is allowed to use some dramaturgische Effekte – some theatrical effects...And that's what I have done."

Four years later, he admitted that he had never been inside Cueva de los Tayos, and had fabricated the entire cave adventure. A geologist found no evidence of artificial tunnels in the area. Father Crespi's gold artifacts, according to an archeologist consulted by Der Spiegel, were mostly brass imitations sold locally as tourist souvenirs.

===== Book of Dzyan and "Tulli Papyrus" =====
Samuel Rosenberg said that the Book of Dzyan, referred to by Däniken, was "a fabrication superimposed on a gigantic hoax concocted by Madame Blavatsky." He also says that the "Tulli Papyrus", cited by Däniken in one of his books, is probably cribbed from the Book of Ezekiel, and quoted Nolli (through Walter Ramberg, Scientific Attache at the U.S. Embassy in Rome), then current Director of the Egyptian Section of the Vatican Museum, as "suspect[ing] that Tulli was taken in and that the papyrus is a fake." According to Richard R. Lingeman of The New York Times, it is likely that Däniken obtained these references from UFO books that mentioned them as real documents.

===== Nazca Lines =====
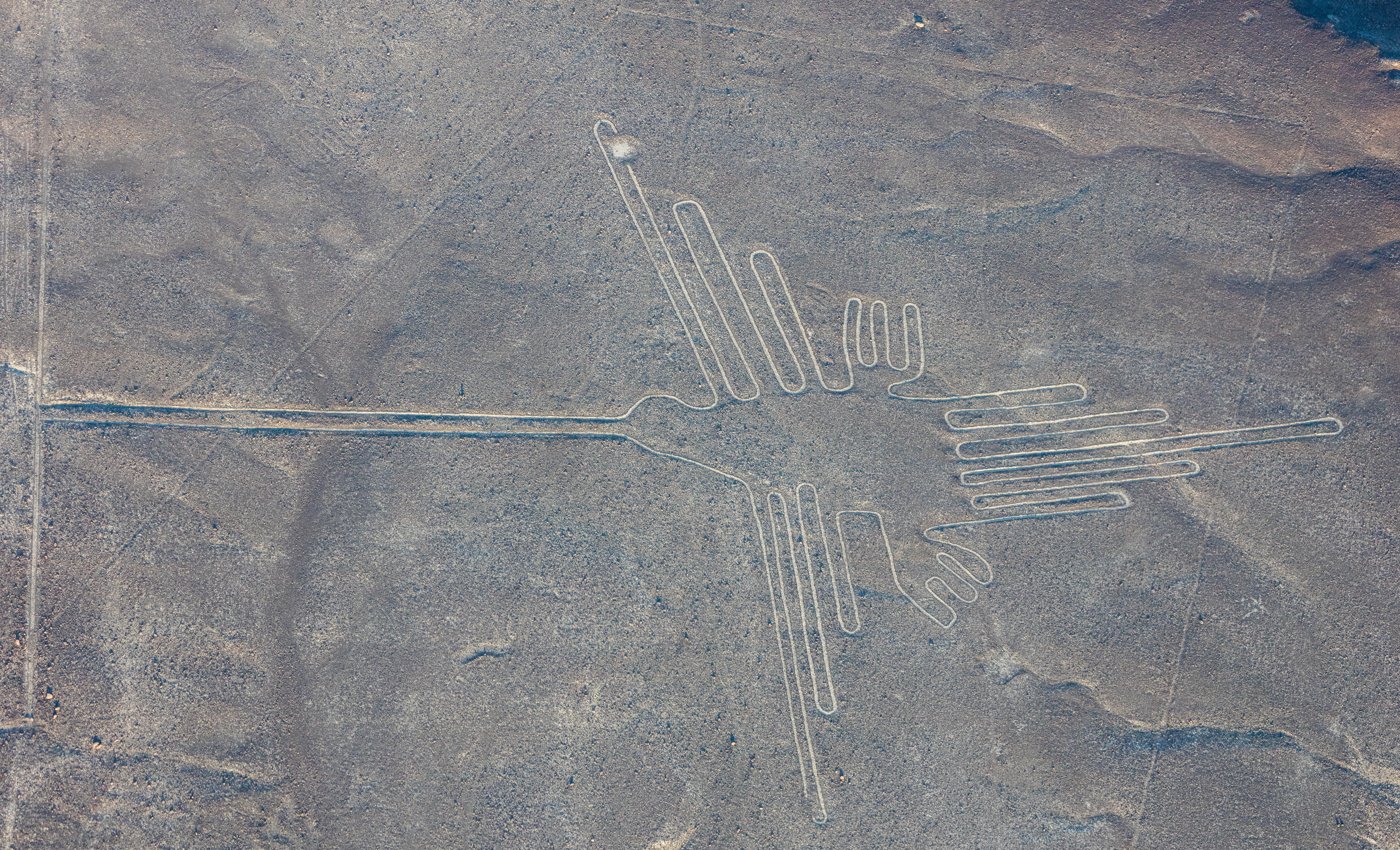
Some of the Nazca lines

Däniken brought the Nazca lines to public prominence in Chariots of the Gods? with his proposal that the lines were built on instructions from extraterrestrial beings as airfields for their spaceships. In his 1998 book Arrival of The Gods, he added that some of the pictures depicted extraterrestrials. The idea did not originate with Däniken; it began after people who first saw the lines from the air made joking comparisons to Martian "canals", and had already been published by others.

Descriptions of some Nazca line photos in Chariots of the Gods? contain significant inaccuracies. One, for example, purporting to demonstrate markings of a modern airport, was actually the knee joint of one of the bird figures, and was quite small. Däniken said that this was an "error" in the first edition, but it has not been corrected in later editions.

Consensus among archeologists is that the Nazca lines were created by pre-Columbian civilizations for cultural purposes. Efforts by archeologists to refute fringe theories such as Däniken's have been minimal, however. Silverman and Proulx have said that this silence from archaeologists has harmed the profession, as well as the Peruvian nation. Däniken's books attracted so many tourists to the Nazca region that researcher Maria Reiche had to spend much of her own time and money preserving the lines.

===== Piri Reis map =====
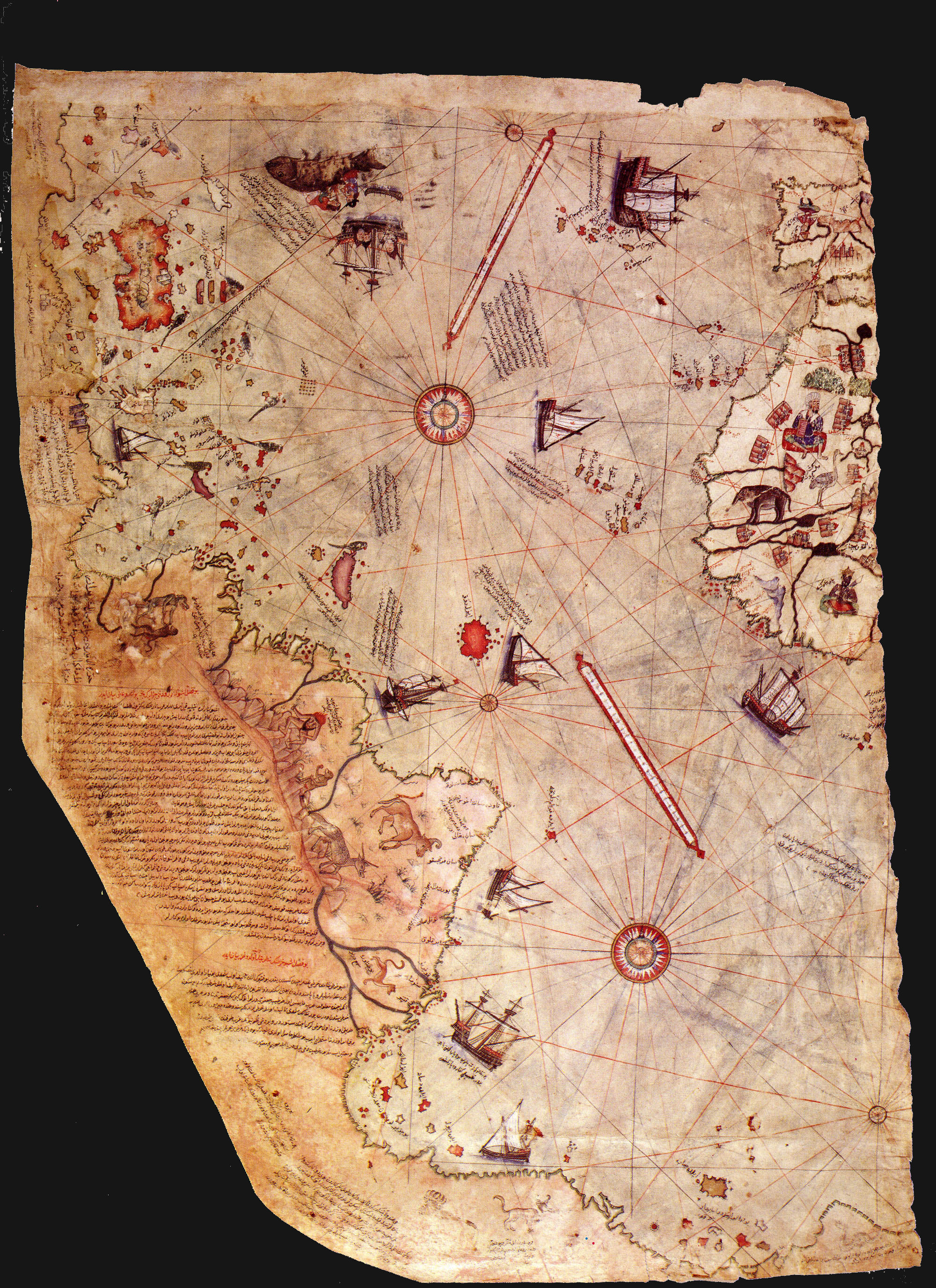
The Piri Reis map

Däniken wrote in Chariots of the Gods? that a version of the Piri Reis map depicted some Antarctic mountains that were and still are buried in ice, and could only be mapped with modern equipment. His theory relies on the book of Maps of the Ancient Sea Kings by Charles Hapgood. A.D. Crown, in Some Trust in Chariots, explains how this is simply wrong. The map in Däniken's book only extends five degrees south of the equator, ending in Cape São Roque, which means that it does not extend to Antarctica. Däniken also said that the map showed some distortions that would only happen if it was an aerial view taken from a spaceship flying above Cairo, but in fact it does not extend far enough to the south to cause visible distortions in an aerial view. Däniken also asserts the existence of a legend saying that a god gave the map to a priest, the god being an extraterrestrial being. But Piri Reis said that he had drawn that map himself using older maps, and the map is consistent with the cartographic knowledge of that time. Also, the map is not "absolutely accurate" as claimed by Däniken, since it contains many errors and omissions; a fact that Däniken did not correct when he covered the map again in his 1998 book Odyssey of the Gods. Other authors had already published this same idea, a fact that Däniken did not recognize until 1974 in an interview with Playboy magazine.

===== Pyramid of Cheops =====
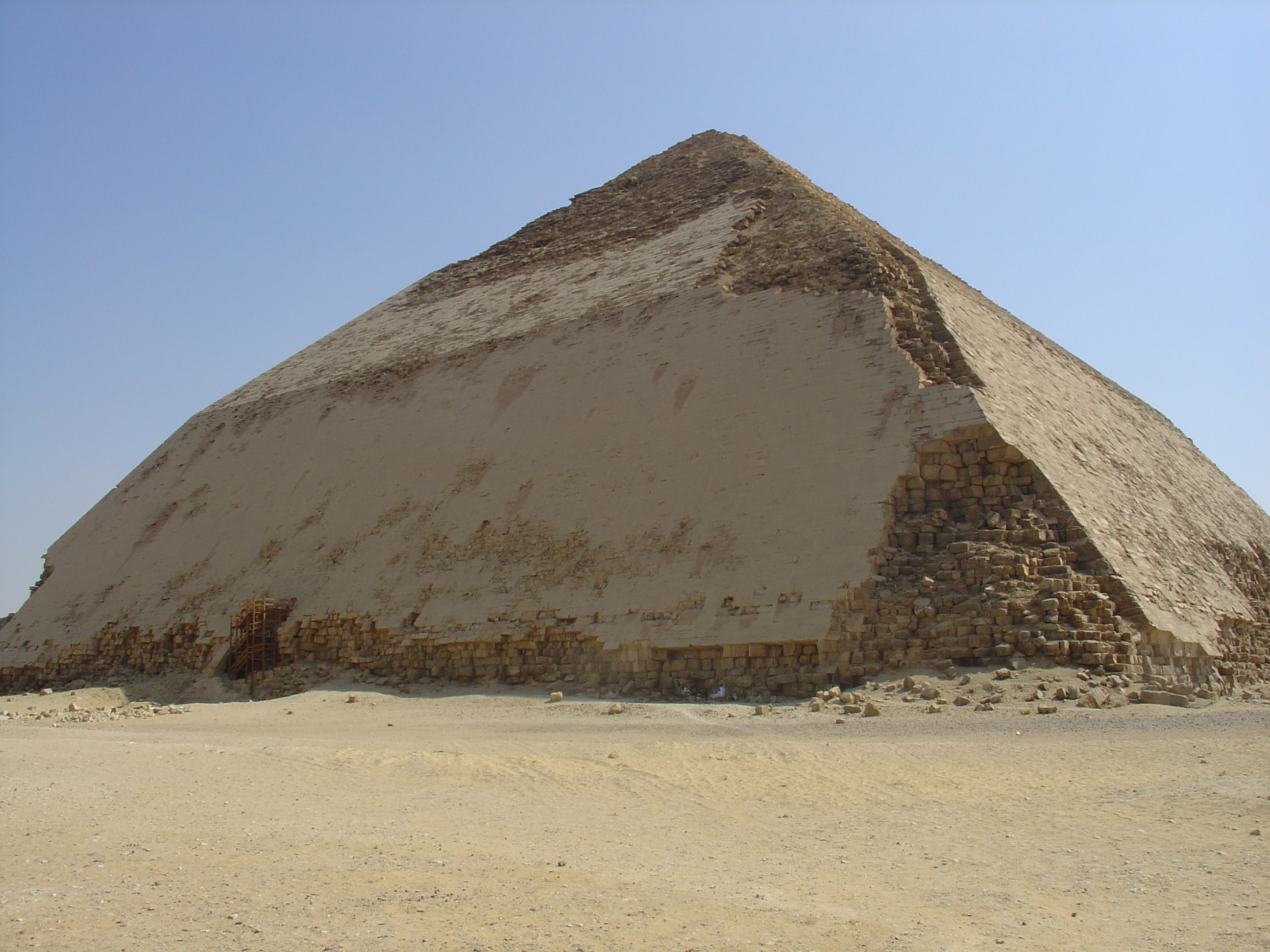
The Bent Pyramid

Erich von Däniken puts forward many beliefs about the Great Pyramid of Giza in his 1968 book Chariots of the Gods?, saying that the ancient Egyptians could not have built it, not having sufficiently advanced tools, leaving no evidence of workers, and incorporating too much 'intimate' knowledge about the Earth and its geography into the design. To date, the technique of construction is not well understood and the tools the Egyptians used are not entirely known; however, marks left in the quarries by those tools are still visible, and many examples of possible tools are preserved in museums. All preserved copper alloy tools of the Old Kingdom era of pyramid builders were recently collected in a monograph. The metal alloy that the Old Kingdom pyramid builders at Giza were using was arsenical copper/bronze, harder than pure copper.

Däniken claimed that it would have taken the Egyptians too long to cut all the blocks necessary and drag them to the construction site in time to build the Great Pyramid in only 20 years; and a Nova documentary failed to demonstrate the proposed construction method, and came to no conclusions about how long the theoretical technique would require to construct the monument. The documentary does not actually demonstrate the cutting or transportation of a true 2.5 ton block but instead has actors portray the theory by pushing what is a prop rock on a prop sled based on an ancient sled that was discovered in Egypt.

Däniken also said that there were too many problems with their tools, and, according to him, the Egyptians had no prehistory so they could not have possibly built these large pyramids, even though there are pyramids in Egypt that were built before the Great Pyramid. Because he believed that there was no prehistory, Däniken put forward that there is nothing known about how, when, or why these pyramids were built.

Däniken also claims that Egyptians built perfect pyramids from the beginning, but numerous pyramid precursors survive, showing the errors made and corrected by Egyptian architects while they were perfecting the technique. These include simple mastabas, the Step Pyramid of Djoser, and the so-called Bent Pyramid.

In his book, he says that there is no evidence of Egyptian workers at the pyramid site; however, archaeologists have found evidence of buildings where workers would have lived, with bakeries and sewer systems. There are also tombs of workers, with some of the skeletons showing evidence of having received medical care. This may indicate the workers were well taken care of, which suggests they were Egyptian.

Däniken states that the Great Pyramid is located on the median line dividing the continents, and that the Egyptians could not have aligned the edges so perfectly to true north without advanced technology that only aliens could give them. Egyptian builders, however, knew of simple methods to find north via star observation. Egyptologists have found artifacts and drawings of an object called a merkhet, which enabled the ancient Egyptians to find true north using the North Star and other stars aligned with the merkhet. The ancient Egyptian astronomers and, possibly, farmers spent much time studying the stars in order to accurately track the agricultural seasons.

===== Sarcophagus of Palenque =====
The lid of the Sarcophagus of Palenque

Däniken claimed that the Sarcophagus of Palenque depicted a spaceman sitting on a rocket-powered spaceship, wearing a spacesuit. However, archaeologists see nothing special about the figure, a dead Maya monarch (Kʼinich Janaabʼ Pakal) wearing traditional Maya hairstyle and jewellery, surrounded by Maya symbols that can be observed in other Maya drawings. The right hand is not handling any rocket controls, but simply making a traditional Maya gesture that other figures in the sides of the lid also make, and is not holding anything. The rocket shape is actually two serpents joining their heads at the bottom, with the rocket "flames" being the beards of the serpents. The rocket motor under the figure is the face of a monster, symbol of the underworld. (In Chariots of the Gods? Von Däniken also incorrectly states the sculpture to be from Copán, rather than Palenque.)

===== Peruvian stones =====
Däniken put forward photographs of the Ica stones, stones in Peru which bear carvings of men using telescopes, detailed world maps, and advanced medical operations, all of which were beyond the knowledge of ancient Peruvians; but the PBS television series Nova determined that the stones were modern, and located the potter who made them. This potter makes stones daily and sells them to tourists. Däniken had visited the potter and examined the stones himself, but he didn't mention this in his book. He says that he didn't believe the potter when he said that he had made the stones. Däniken says that he asked Doctor Cabrera, a local surgeon who owns the museum, and Cabrera had told him that the potter's claims were a lie and that the stones were ancient. But the potter had proof that Cabrera had thanked him for providing the stones for the museum. Däniken claimed that the stones at the museum were very different from those made by the potter, but the Nova reporters oversaw the manufacturing of one stone and confirmed that it was very similar to those in the museum.

==== Accusations of European ethnocentrism ====
Kenneth Feder accused Däniken of European ethnocentrism, while John Flenley and Paul Bahn suggested that views such as his interpretation of the Easter Island statues "ignore the real achievements of our ancestors and constitute the ultimate in racism: they belittle the abilities and ingenuity of the human species as a whole."

==== Other criticisms ====
Ronald Story published The Space Gods Revealed: A Close Look at the Theories of Erich Von Däniken in 1976, written in response to the evidence presented in Däniken's Chariots of the Gods?. It was reviewed as "a coherent and much-needed refutation of von Däniken's theories". Archeologist Clifford Wilson wrote two books similarly debunking Däniken: Crash Go the Chariots in 1972 and The Chariots Still Crash in 1975.

A 2004 article in Skeptic states that Däniken took many of the book's concepts from The Morning of the Magicians (1960), that this book in turn was heavily influenced by the Cthulhu Mythos, and that the core of the ancient astronaut theory originates in H. P. Lovecraft's stories "The Call of Cthulhu", written in 1926, and At the Mountains of Madness, written in 1931.

Jason Colavito (who has made or echoed some of the criticisms above) has criticized Däniken's book Signs of the Gods from 1979 for what he describes as making very racist claims while speculating that ancient aliens created varying human races.

== Popularity ==
Däniken during a speech at the University of Georgia, c. 1974

According to Däniken, books in his series have altogether been translated into 32 languages and have sold more than 63 million copies.

Based on Däniken's books, a comic album series, Die Götter aus dem All (The Gods from Outer Space), has been created by Bogusław Polch, written by Arnold Mostowicz and Alfred Górny. In 1978–1982 eight volumes were translated into 12 languages and have sold over 5 million copies.

Jungfrau Park, located near Interlaken, Switzerland, was opened as the Mystery Park in 2003. Designed by Däniken, it explored several great "mysteries" of the world.

Ridley Scott said that his film Prometheus is related to some of Däniken's ideas regarding early human civilization. Reviewing the two-disc DVD release of Roland Emmerich's film Stargate, Dean Devlin referred to the "Is There a Stargate?" feature where "author Erich von Däniken discusses evidence he has found of alien visitations to Earth".

Däniken was an occasional presenter on the History Channel and H2 show Ancient Aliens, where he talked about aspects of his theories as they pertain to each episode.

=== "Dänikenitis" ===
Erich von Däniken acknowledged his popularity by referring to the phrase "Dänikenitis", which he mentions in his book Chariots of the Gods?

"Dänikenitis" slowed down in the 1970s when he began to be heavily criticized by archeologists and astronomers. This criticism brought a halt to translations of his books into English. He returned to a level of popularity when he produced a twenty-five-part German television series in 1993, and this led to his books being translated into English once again. Germany and other European countries have large support for Von Däniken's work, and he was able to continue to fill auditoriums all throughout the 1990s.

== Personal life and death ==
Däniken married Elisabeth Skaja in 1960. They had one child. Däniken died at Interlaken Hospital in Unterseen on 10 January 2026, aged 90.

== Books ==
According to his agent, von Däniken wrote 49 books, which sold 75 million copies and were translated into more than 30 languages.

- Chariots of the Gods? (Souvenir Press Ltd, 1969)
- Return to the Stars (Souvenir Press Ltd, 1970) ISBN 0285502980
- Gods from Outer Space (Bantam,1972; reprint of Return to the Stars)
- Erich von Däniken (1973) [1972]. The Gold of the Gods. Translated by Michael Heron (1st ed.). London: Souvenir Press. Published simultaneously in Canada by J. M. Dent & Sons, Ontario (Canada).
- Miracles of the Gods: A Hard Look at the Supernatural (Souvenir Press Ltd, 1975) ISBN 0285621742
- In Search of Ancient Gods: My Pictorial Evidence for the Impossible (Corgi books, 1976) ISBN 0552100730
- According to the Evidence (Souvenir Press, 1977) ISBN 028562301X
- Signs of the Gods (Corgi books, 1980) ISBN 0552117161
- The Stones of Kiribati: Pathways to the Gods (Corgi books, 1982) ISBN 0552121835
- The Gods and their Grand Design: The Eighth Wonder of the World (Souvenir Press, 1984) ISBN 0285626302
- The Eyes of the Sphinx: The Newest Evidence of Extraterrestrial Contact (Berkley Publishing Corporation, 1996) ISBN 978-0425151303
- The Return of the Gods: Evidence of Extraterrestrial Visitations (Element, 1998) ISBN 1862042535
- Arrival of the Gods: Revealing the Alien Landing Sites of Nazca (Element, 1998) ISBN 1862043531
- The Gods Were Astronauts: Evidence of the True Identities of the Old "Gods" (Vega books, 2001) ISBN 1843336251
- Odyssey of the Gods: An Alien History of Ancient Greece (Vega books, 2002) ISBN 978-1601631923
- History Is Wrong (New Page books, 2009) ISBN 1601630867
- Evidence of the Gods (New Page books, 2010) ISBN 1601632479
- Twilight of the Gods: The Mayan Calendar and the Return of the Extraterrestrials (New Page books, 2010) ISBN 1601631413
- Tomy and the Planet of Lies (Tantor eBooks, 2012) ISBN 0988349434
- Remnants of the Gods: A Visual Tour of Alien Influence in Egypt, Spain, France, Turkey, and Italy (New Page Books, 2013) ISBN 1601632835
- The Gods Never Left Us (New Page Books, 2018) ISBN 978-1632651198
- Eyewitness to the Gods (New Page Books, 2019) ISBN 978-1632651686
- War of the Gods (New Page Books, 2020) ISBN 978-1632651716
- Confessions of an Egyptologist: Lost Libraries, Vanished Labyrinths & the Astonishing Truth Under the Saqqara Pyramids (New Page Books, 2021) ISBN 978-1632651914
- Skies Afire: War, Machines, and Technology in the Ancient Texts, with Mauro Biglino (Tuthi, 2025)

=== German language ===
- Erinnerungen an die Zukunft (1968)
- Zurück zu den Sternen: Argumente für das Unmögliche (1969)
- Erich von Däniken (1972). Aussaat und Kosmos. Spuren und Pläne außerirdischer Intelligenzen (in German) (1st ed.). Düsseldorf: Econ-Verlag.
- Strategie der Götter: Das Achte Weltwunder (1982) ISBN 3430119790
- Der Tag an dem die Götter kamen (1984) ISBN 3442084784
- Habe ich mich geirrt? (1985) ISBN 3570030598
- Wir alle sind Kinder der Götter (1987) C. Bertelsmann, ISBN 3570030601
- Die Augen der Sphinx (1989) C. Bertelsmann, ISBN 3570043908
- Die Spuren der Ausserirdischen (1990) (Bildband) ISBN 3570094197
- Die Steinzeit war ganz anders (1991) ISBN 3570036189
- Ausserirdische in Ägypten (1991)
- Erinnerungen an die Zukunft (1992) (Reissue with new foreword)
- Der Götter-Schock (1992) ISBN 3570045005
- Raumfahrt im Altertum (1993) ISBN 3570120236
- Auf den Spuren der Allmächtigen (1993) C. Bertelsmann, ISBN 3570017265
- Botschaften und Zeichen aus dem Universum (1994) C. Bertelsmann, ISBN 3442126886
- Im Name von Zeus (2001) C. Bertelsmann, ISBN 863312372X
- Götterdämmerung (2009) KOPP Verlag ISBN 3942016044
- Grüße aus der Steinzeit: Wer nicht glauben will, soll sehen! (2010)
- Was ist falsch im Maya-Land?: Versteckte Technologien in Tempeln und Skulpturen (2011)
- Was ich jahrzehntelang verschwiegen habe (2015) ISBN 3864452384
- Botschaften aus dem Jahr 2118: Neue Erinnerungen an die Zukunft (2020) ISBN 3864457297

== Films ==
- Harald Reinl: Chariots of the Gods (1970). A documentary.
- Erich von Däniken: Mysteries of the Gods / Message of the Gods (1976), directed by Harald Reinl and Charles Romine (English version), music by Peter Thomas . In the English version, William Shatner was the narrator.
- Ferry Radax: Mit Erich von Däniken in Peru (With Erich von Däniken in Peru, 1982). A documentary.
- "Daniken": a video song directed by Samik Roy Choudhury, sung and written by Rupam Islam of West Bengal, India.

== Comic books ==
- Landung in den Anden (1978), ASIN B0026L4WF0
- Atlantis – Experimente mit Menschen und Monstern (1978), ASIN B003KZBI8K
- Krieg der Feuerwagen – Report einer Invasion (1978), ASIN B003KZ7OPG
- Revolte der Titanen (1978), ASIN B003KZ9RO2
- Der Untergang von Atlantis – Die Rache der Götter (1978), ASIN B003KZ9VXE
- Als Sodom und Gomorrha starben (1978), ASIN B003KZA1MY
- Das Geheimnis der Pyramide (1982), ASIN B003V4NIW4
- Als die Sonne still stand (1982), ASIN B003V4K2Y6

== See also ==
- David Icke
- Frauds, Myths, and Mysteries: Science and Pseudoscience in Archaeology (book)
- Graham Hancock
- List of Ig Nobel Prize winners
- Mauro Biglino
- Oolon Colluphid (fictional character)
- Zecharia Sitchin
