= Kopp Verlag =

German publisher

Kopp Verlag is a German publisher based in Rottenburg am Neckar. It publishes books and an online news website notably in the field of right-wing esotericism, populism and extremism, as well as pseudoscience and conspiracy theories. Other topics include wellness, outdoor equipment, survival skills and self-defense.

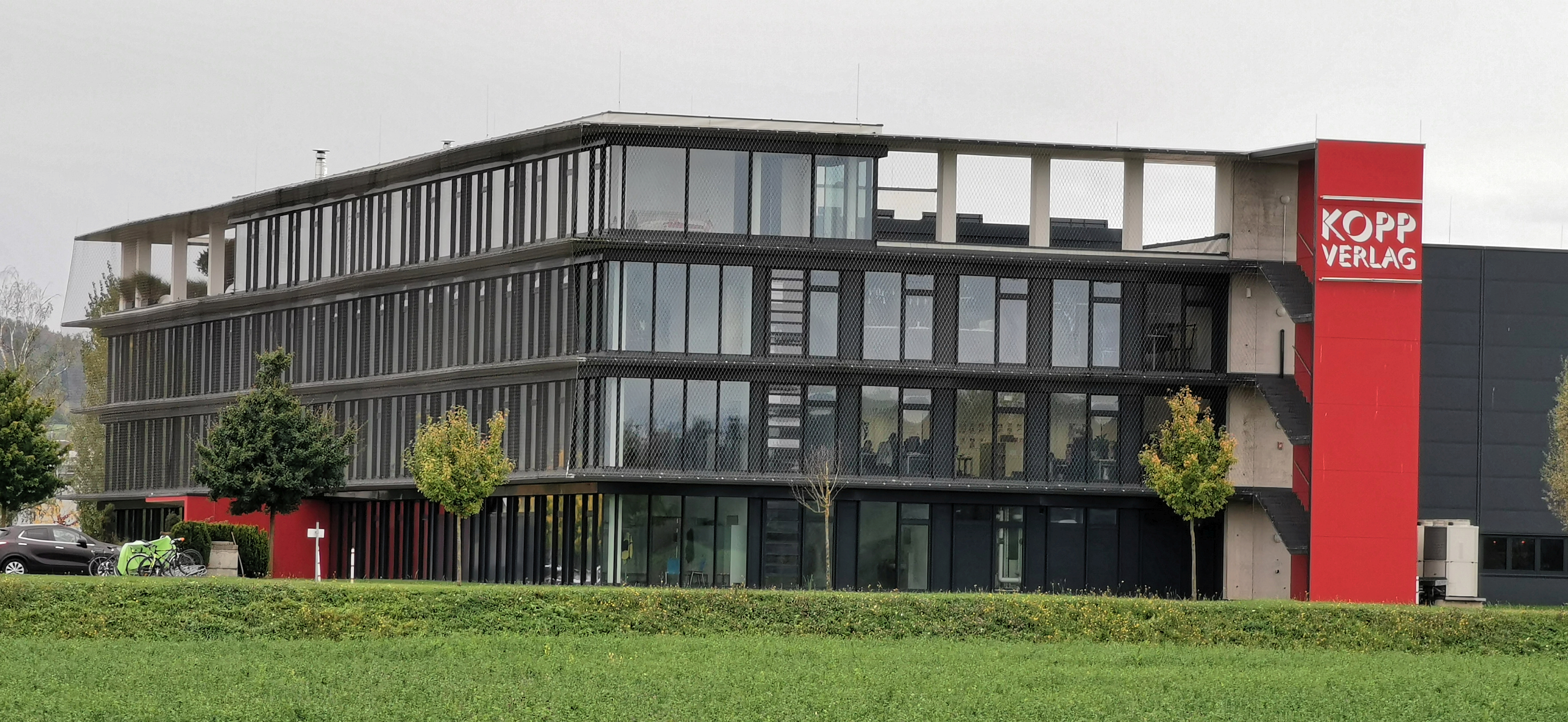
Kopp Verlag in 2019

== Topics and publications ==
Founded by the former policeman Jochen Kopp, the company ships up to 25,000 books per day and has about 80 employees, according to its own account.

Among the topics addressed by Kopp's books are ancient astronauts, ufology, the phantom time hypothesis, creationism, astrology, geomancy, Germanic mythology, Islamism, Freiwirtschaft and "gender and gender mainstreaming".

Eva Herman was approving of the 2010 Love Parade disaster as a response by "other powers" to the "shameless display", one by Udo Ulfkotte about how the 2011 E. coli outbreak was supposedly spread by "oriental" farmhands waging a "fecal jihad", and one by Gerhard Wisnewski about the supposed transsexuality of Michelle Obama.

In addition to its own books and media, Kopp also sells books by other publishers as well as food and survival equipment.

=== Online ===
Over time, Kopp-Verlag has built its own online media, some of which have since been discontinued or replaced by new formats.

From 2010 to 2012, Kopp produced the five-minute "Kopp News" on weekdays, hosted by former Tagesschau anchor Eva Herman. The news portal "Kopp Online," which was discontinued in 2016, had around six million hits per month in January 2016.

The information portal "Kopp-Report" has existed since September 2017.

From February 2012 to October 2016, Kopp-Verlag hosted lectures and conferences in several cities in southern Germany. The speakers were mostly its own authors.

In addition to Kopp exklusiv, an eight-page newsletter, the company publishes Kopp Online, a website with articles and previously also videos covering the abovementioned topics.

== History ==
The publisher's company founder, Jochen Kopp, was a police officer until the mid-1990s. Then he founded the publishing house and published books about UFOs, secret societies and other conspiracies. Later, the Euro crisis and the global financial system were added as important topics. Since the attacks of September 11, 2001, it has focused on conspiracy theories. In addition to original editions of books by authors such as Udo Ulfkotte and Bruno Bandulet, Kopp-Verlag also publishes translations and reprints of older books.

Most of them involve conspiracies, sometimes they come from the US Federal Reserve Bank, sometimes from the Bank for International Settlements in Basel, which allegedly wants to bring about the collapse of the financial system.

In 2013 the publisher moved to a larger building.

== Reception ==
According to Stefan Kaiser in Spiegel Online, Kopp publishes conspiracy theorists alongside "serious" anti-European authors such as the professors Joachim Starbatty, Wilhelm Nölling, Karl Albrecht Schachtschneider and Dieter Spethmann.

In 2010, Die Welt described Kopp Verlag as a company specializing in "esotericism, conspiracy theories and disinformation", and the Schwäbisches Tagblatt characterized its range as encompassing "ufology, the 'Germanic New Medicine' of the spirit healer Ryke Geerd Hamer and supposed revelations about the Communist background of ecologism or the Islamization of the West". The Gemeinschaftswerk der Evangelischen Publizistik described Kopp's authors in 2010 as a "who-is-who of German conspiracism", including several authors espousing right-wing and esoteric ideologies.

The FAZ referred to the Kopp-Verlag in 2015 as part of a growing "industry of fear", and Spiegel Online wrote in 2014 that the publisher's "business model of fear" made it, with its "mixture of right-wing populism, anticapitalism and taboo-breaker's attitude" a pioneer of the zeitgeist of anti-political correctness.

On October 29, 2016, the publishing house held another congress in Augsburg, this time on the topic of geopolitics. Speakers were Udo Ulfkotte, Wolfgang Effenberger, F. William Engdahl, Peter Orzechowski and Daniele Ganser.

== Support of AfD ==
Individual authors from Kopp Publishing are or were active as politicians, employees, or speakers for the AfD, such as AfD member of the Bundestag Peter Boehringer and Thor Kunkel, an AfD advisor for the 2017 federal election. Author Joachim Starbatty was an AfD MEP before leaving the party in 2015 and wrote a right-wing critique of the EU and the euro.

Jürgen Elsässer, the best-known right-wing propagandist and AfD supporter, is an author for Kopp.

== Authors ==
Among the Kopp Verlag's authors are the following:

- Bruno Bandulet
- Manfred Böckl
- Zbigniew Brzezinski
- Andreas von Bülow
- Erich von Däniken
- Jürgen Elsässer
- F. William Engdahl
- Erdoğan Ercivan
- Viktor Farkas
- Peter Fiebag
- Michael Grandt
- G. Edward Griffin
- Günter Hannich
- Wilhelm Hankel
- Michael Hesemann
- Jan Udo Holey alias Jan van Helsing
- Heiko Krimmer
- Illobrand von Ludwiger
- Wilhelm Nölling
- Ron Paul
- Andreas von Rétyi
- Armin Risi
- Klaus Rainer Röhl
- Karl Albrecht Schachtschneider
- Zecharia Sitchin
- Dieter Spethmann
- Axel Stoll
- Joachim Starbatty
- Webster Tarpley
- Udo Ulfkotte
- Gerhard Wisnewski
