= Jungfrau Park =

Amusement park in the Canton of Bern, Switzerland

- Previously known as Mystery Park
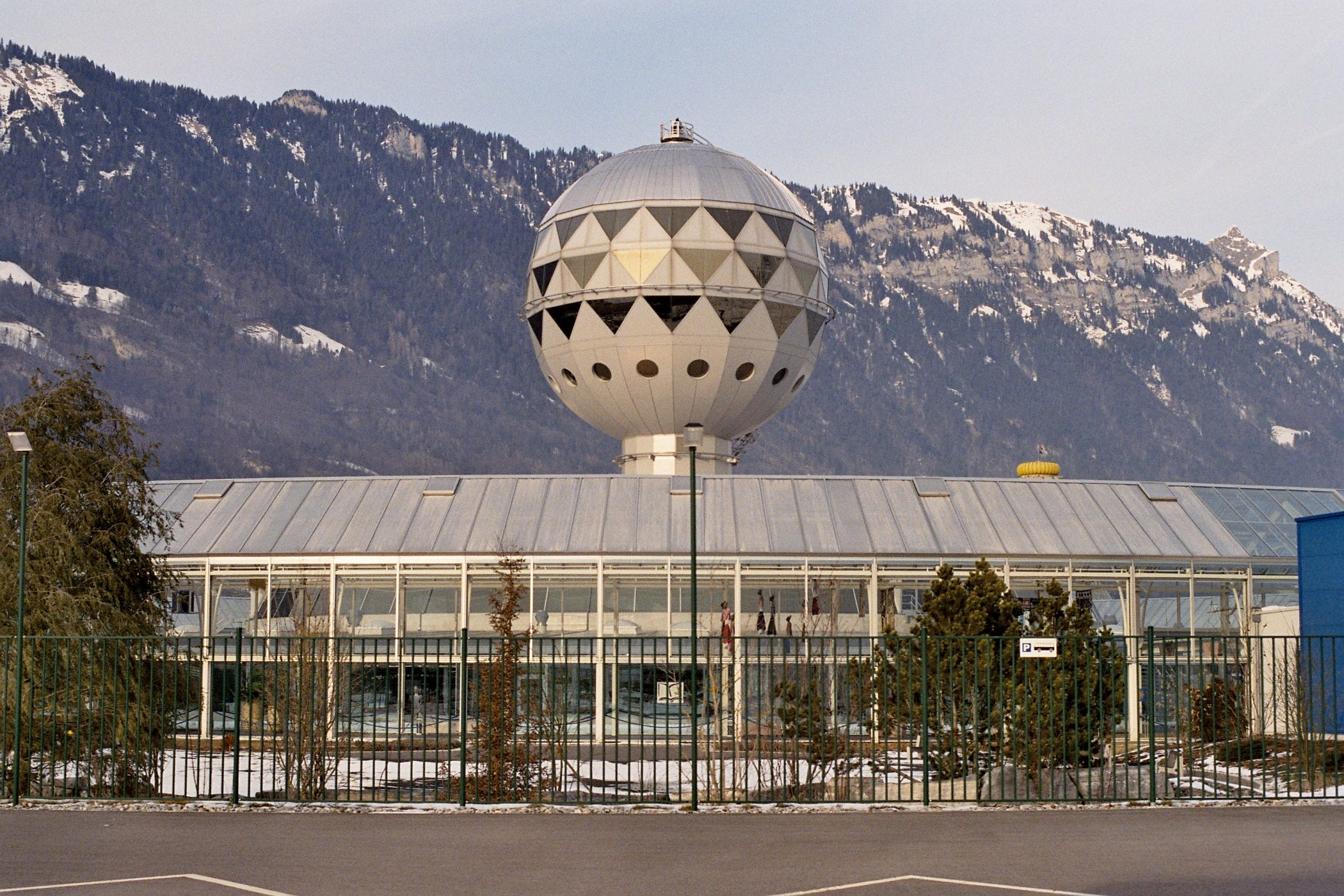
- The Panorama Kugel of the Jungfrau Park
- Interactive map of Jungfrau Park
- Location: Interlaken, Bern Canton, Switzerland
- Coordinates: 46°40′56″N 7°53′17″E
- Opened: 24 May 2003
- Closed: 19 November 2006
- Attendance: 225,000 (2005)

Jungfrau Park was an amusement park located near Interlaken, Switzerland. It opened as the Mystery Park in 2003, and closed in November 2006 due to financial difficulties and low turnout. The park was designed by Erich von Däniken, and consisted of seven pavilions, each of which featured one of several great "mysteries" of the world.

Von Däniken opened the theme park to present his interpretations of archaeological sites around the world, claiming that they involve visits from extraterrestrial life. Since 2009 it has regularly re-opened for the summer seasons as the Jungfrau Park.

== The Pavilions ==
- Nazca featured the Nazca Lines near Nazca, Peru.
- Contact featured cargo cults.
- MegaStones featured Stonehenge.
- Maya featured the Maya calendar.
- Orient featured Great Pyramid of Giza.
- Vimana featured the Vimana (flying palaces and chariots) described in the Mahabharata and the Rig Veda.
- Challenge covered space flight and Mars exploration.

The Panorama Kugel was the central pavilion, topped by a 41-metre high sphere, from which the park's grounds could be seen. The "Kugel" contained exhibits of von Däniken's works.

Erich von Däniken used the different pavilions to show the works that he believed extraterrestrials have had on ancient artifacts. His book Chariots of the Gods? explains his ideas on each of these pavilions and how they are all linked to visits from outer space.

== Controversy ==
Von Däniken was an ancient astronaut theorist. All attractions heavily advocated the idea that aliens visited Earth in the ancient past.

The Mystery Park was labeled a "cultural Chernobyl" by Académie suisse des sciences techniques member Antoine Wasserfallen who was cited by the Swiss newspaper Le Temps and other media. The Swiss federal railroad company (SBB) advertised for the park and sold a combined ticket.

Controversy struck again in August 2005 when Erich von Däniken decided to have a special exhibition on crop circles and also a "crop circle making competition." When the competition garnered no entrants, the park commissioned land surveyor and artist Vitali Kuljasov to create a complex crop circle in a field near the park entrance. A webcam (capable of still images but not video) was set up and pointed at the field, allegedly to document Kuljasov's technique. The night before Kuljasov was to create his circle, another circle appeared in the field. Several paranormal investigators came to Mystery Park, examined the crop circle, and concluded that it was obviously man-made due to "obvious mistakes and a crooked performance." (Jay Goldner, a crop circle investigator from Vienna, was the lone dissenter.)

Still photographs from the webcam showed little about what went on that night due to the darkness and the angle of the camera. Investigators noted the appearance of car headlights coming and leaving around the time the crop circle was estimated to have been made. The consensus was that the circle was created by "very human hoaxers".

== Failure of Mystery Park ==
In the winter of 2004, the park and its governmental support came under heavy criticism by the news channel SRG SSR idée suisse. Owing to failed expectations that projected 500,000 guests per year when in 2005 only 200,000 visited the park, Mystery Park found itself in dire financial straits. Operation of the park was suspended on 19 November 2006.

Critics also attributed the park's failure to other reasons: some cited von Däniken's biases regarding alien interactions with ancient civilizations. Although these ideas worked well for his book and documentaries, they had less appeal for theme park visitors.

== Reopening ==
On 16 May 2009, the park was renamed Jungfrau Park and reopened by its new owner, New Inspiration Inc., for the summer season hoping to attract at least 500 visitors a day until 1 November. In June, a children's paradise (German: Kinderparadies) was planned. It opened again for the 2010 season.

In August 2025, the site was taken over by Etherlaken, a regenerative living innovation centre co-founded by CEO Ralph Horat and Ethereum co-founder Mihai Alisie and Jürgen Wowra. The project reimagined the space as a hub for community development and decentralized technology.
