= The Space Gods Revealed =

1976 book by Ronald Story

The Space Gods Revealed: A Close Look at the Theories of Erich von Däniken
- Author: Ronald D. Story
- Language: English
- Subject: Pseudoscience, archeology, history
- Publisher: Harper & Row
- Publication date: 1976
- Media type: Print (hardcover, paperback)
- Pages: 139
- ISBN: 0-06-014141-7

The Space Gods Revealed: A Close Look at the Theories of Erich von Däniken is a book written in 1976 by Ronald Story, with an introduction by Carl Sagan. It was written as a refutation to the theories and evidence in Erich von Däniken's most famous work, Chariots of the Gods?.

In a foreword to the book, Carl Sagan took exception to flaws in reasoning and assumptions by von Däniken. While Sagan promoted the idea that intelligent life was very likely present elsewhere in the universe, he did not find von Däniken's conclusions well founded.

In an interview with the New York Times, Andy Warhol praised Story for providing "a sustained, book-length attack on von Däniken's theories and evidence". Warhol pointed out that scientists and scholars failed to critique von Däniken's work, but the "amateur" Story, "a college philosophy major who works for the Tucson, Ariz. Gas and Electric Company", rose to the challenge. Warhol stated that Story reached out to Sagan for information. "Because he [Sagan] was so glad someone was taking time to investigate von Däniken's contentions", Sagan offered to write the foreword.

== Reviews ==
The book was reviewed by R. Z. Sheppard in Time magazine, describing Story's book as "a coherent and much-needed refutation of Von Däniken's theories". Phoebe Lou-Adams in The Atlantic magazine states that "Mr. Story demolishes von Däniken's notion that visitors from outer space are responsible for all human progress".

== Release details ==
- The Space Gods Revealed – ISBN 0-06-014141-7 (hardback), ISBN 0-450-03370-8 (paperback).

== See also ==
- Raëlism
- Ancient astronauts
