= Axel Stoll =

German geophysicist and conspiracy theorist (1948–2014)

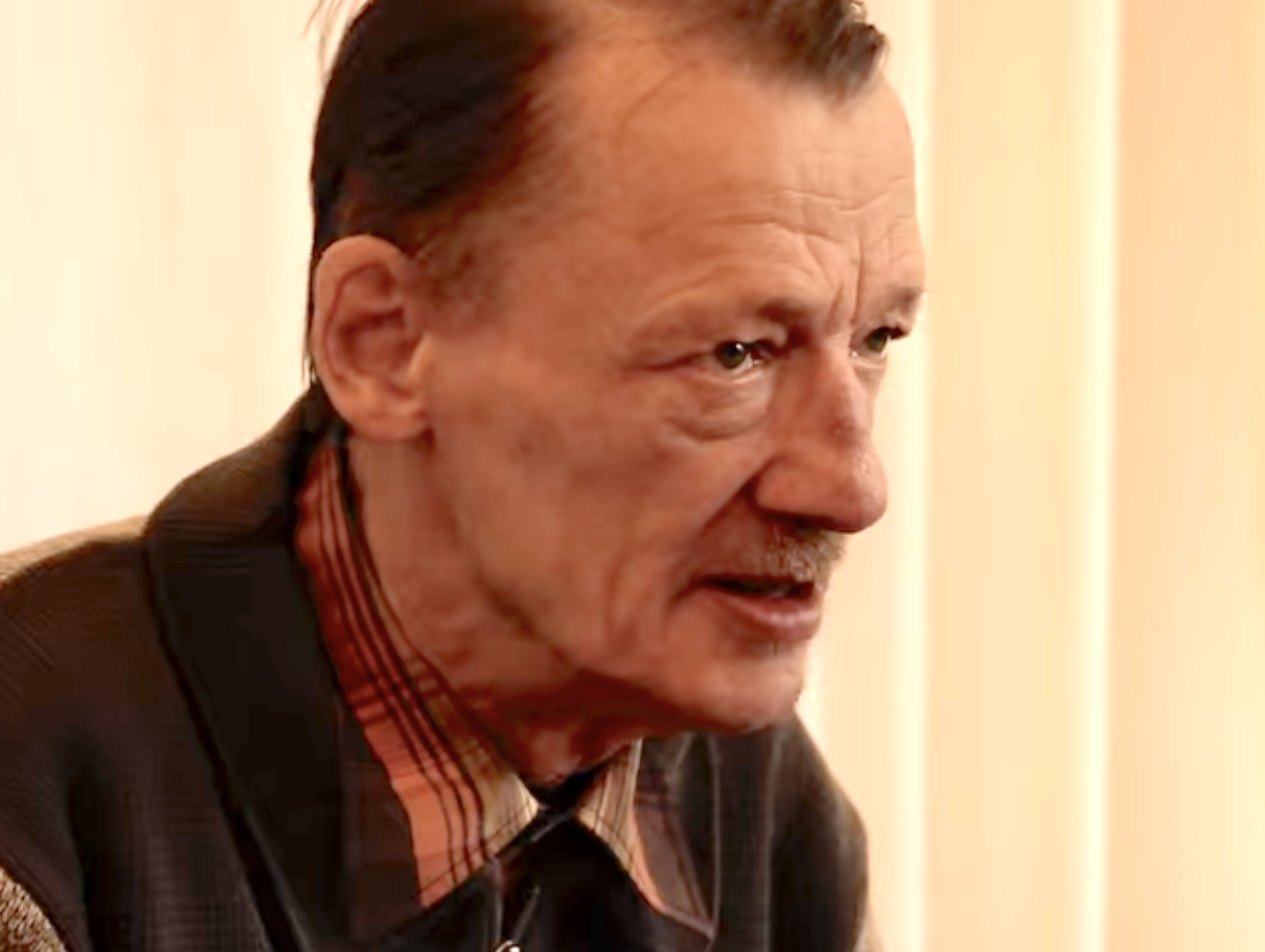
- Stoll
- Born: October 30, 1948; Berlin, Germany
- Died: July 28, 2014 (aged 65)
- Website: www.axel-stoll.com

Axel Stoll (30 October 1948 – 28 July 2014) was a far-right esoteric German geophysicist and conspiracy theorist. He wrote many books, including Hochtechnologie im Dritten Reich and Das Wissen um die unterdrückte Physik - Ein Buch von Axel Stoll, combining pseudo-science and various conspiracy theories, especially concerning Nazi Germany. He received notoriety through the publication of internet videos.

Vice described him as "probably Germany's best known conspiracy theorist".

== Conspiracy theories ==
=== Second World War ===
Several of Axel Stoll's conspiracy theories centered on World War II. He thought that Germany colonized the Moon after the defeat of the Wehrmacht.

=== Aldebaran and the races ===
Axel Stoll thought that the Aryan race actually are descendants from aliens of the star Aldebaran and that Earth is a jail planet for those who did wrong. In his opinion, all races are fighting for superiority.

== Private life ==
Stoll lived divorced from his wife and had a son.

== Death ==
The police of Berlin confirmed that Stoll was found dead on July 28, 2014, in an apartment.

== Publications ==
Axel Stoll wrote a large number of books dealing mainly with his theories around war technology and physics:

- Hochtechnologie im Dritten Reich. Kopp Verlag. 2004. ISBN 3-930219-85-9.
- Bis heute unterdrückt: das Wissen um die wahre Physik. Extrem Verlag. 2005. ISBN 3-935054-08-4.
- Hochtechnologien uralter Kulturen. Freier-Falke-Verlag. 2006. ISBN 978-3-935054-20-1.
