= Carlo Crespi Croci =

Italian priest and anthropologist in Ecuador (1891–1982)

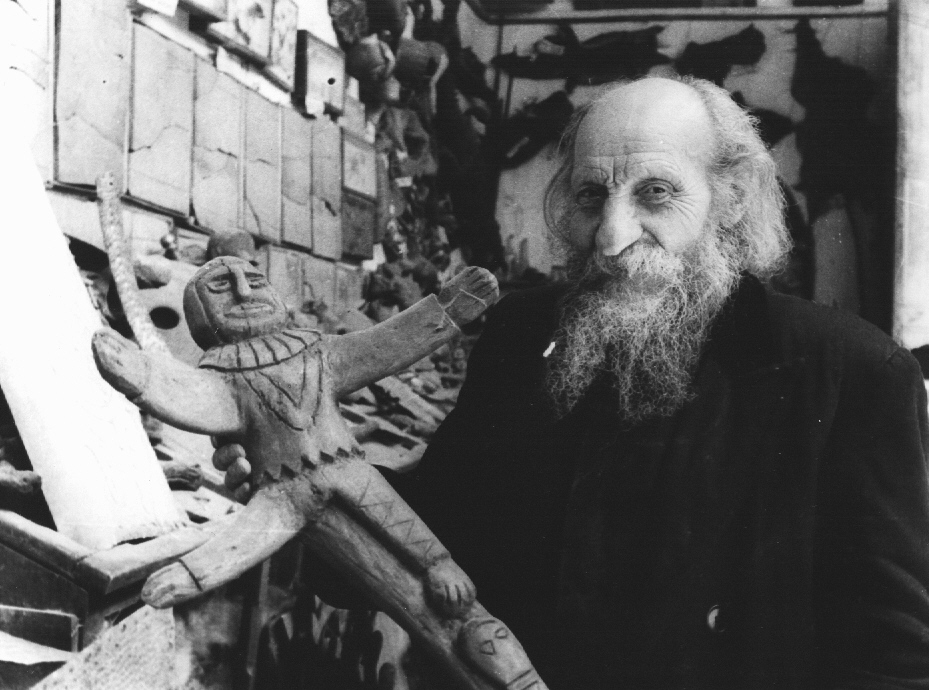
- Born: 29 May 1891; Legnano, Lombardy, Italy
- Died: 30 April 1982 (aged 90); Cuenca, Azuay, Ecuador
- Resting place: Cementerio Patrimonial de Cuenca
- Education: University of Padua
- Occupations: Catholic priest, missionary, anthropologist, filmmaker

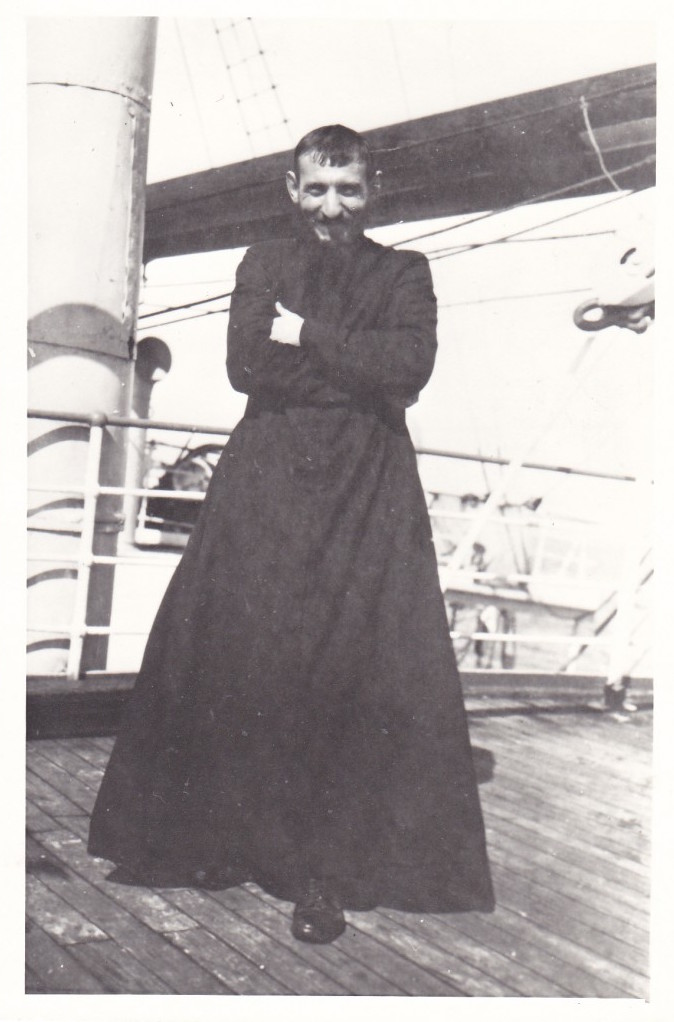
Crespi aboard the steamboat Venezuela, 1926

Carlo Crespi Croci (29 May 1891 – 30 April 1982) was an Italian Salesian priest, anthropologist, and filmmaker. He lived for over sixty years as a missionary in Ecuador.

== Biography ==
Carlo Crespi was the third of thirteen children born to Daniele Crespi, a peasant, and his wife Luisa Croci. In 1907, he began his novitiate in Foglizzo and between 1909 and 1911 he studied philosophy in Valsalice, where he met priest Renato Ziggiotti, who would live to become the successor of John Bosco. On Sunday, 28 January 1917, Crespi was ordained priest.

In 1921, Crespi graduated in natural sciences, specializing in botany, at the University of Padua. He defended a thesis entitled "Contribution to the knowledge of fresh water fauna in the region of Este and neighboring locations. Swamps, channels, pits, sources of Euganei, of lakes from Arquà and Venda." Three months later, he graduated in piano and composition at the Cesare Pollini conservatory, located in the same city.

During his time in Ecuador, he lived with the Shuar people of the Amazon. In addition to his religious work, he dedicated himself to education, cinema, anthropology, and archaeology. He was one of the first to investigate the Cueva de los Tayos. He was one of the forerunners of Ecuadorian cinema with his documentary The invincible Shuaras of High Amazonas (1926). Its images were recovered and stored years after the footage was taken.

During his missionary life, he collected a number of archaeological artifacts, with which he intended to form a museum. After some thefts, in 1978, with his assent, it was decided that works with a certain value would be bought because of a debt with the Central Bank of Ecuador. Over five thousand objects with archaeological value and character were inventoried and sold, as well as a smaller number of objects of sculptural or ethnographic aspect. Some of them were out-of-place artifacts that some assumed to have been created before the Great Flood, around which interest and debate already had developed. When interviewed, Crespi always declared that all elements in his museum were donated to him by the Shuar, who in turn took them from the Cueva de los Tayos.

He was mainly active in Cuenca, where he founded numerous schools and educational institutes, as well as eateries and laboratories dedicated to poor children. In 1940, he founded the Faculty of Education and was its first dean. He was proclaimed "Cuenca's most illustrious citizen in the 20th century". His memory was immortalized in the names of several institutions and places such as a street and a square where a statue representing him with a child stands.
