= Cueva de los Tayos =

Cave in Ecuador

- Cueva de los Tayos de Coangos
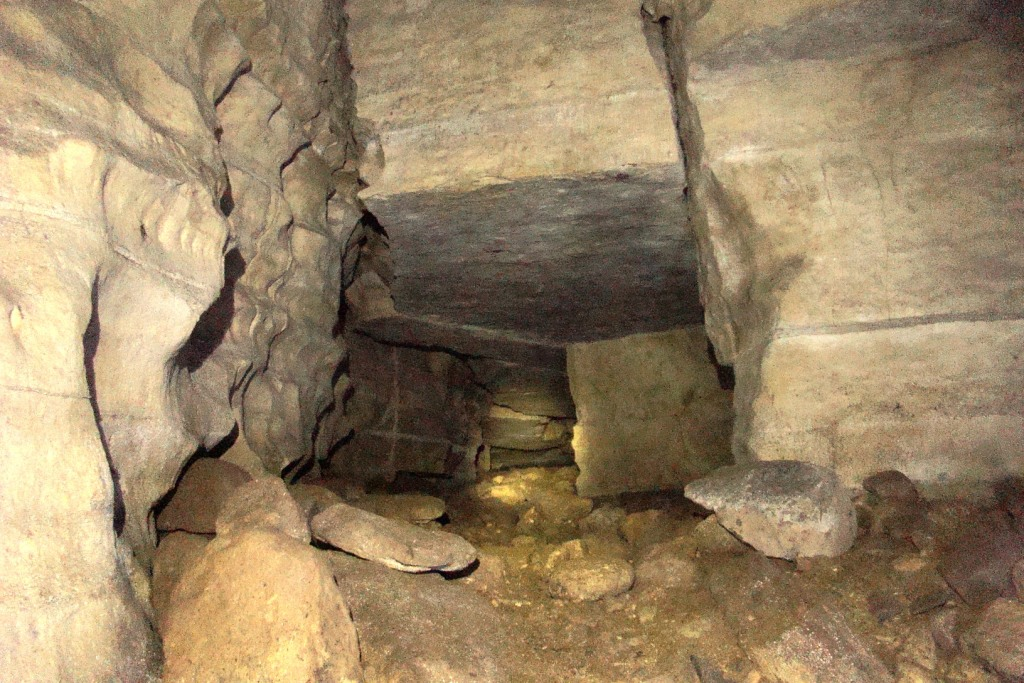
- Cueva de los Tayos

- Location within Ecuador
- Location: Morona-Santiago Province
- Coordinates: 3°03′07.5″S 78°12′19.3″W
- Length: 4.6 km (2.9 mi)
- Elevation: 539 m (1,768 ft)
- Discovery: Precolumbian era
- Geology: Limestone & shale
- Access: Restricted
- Translation: Cave of the Oilbirds (Spanish)

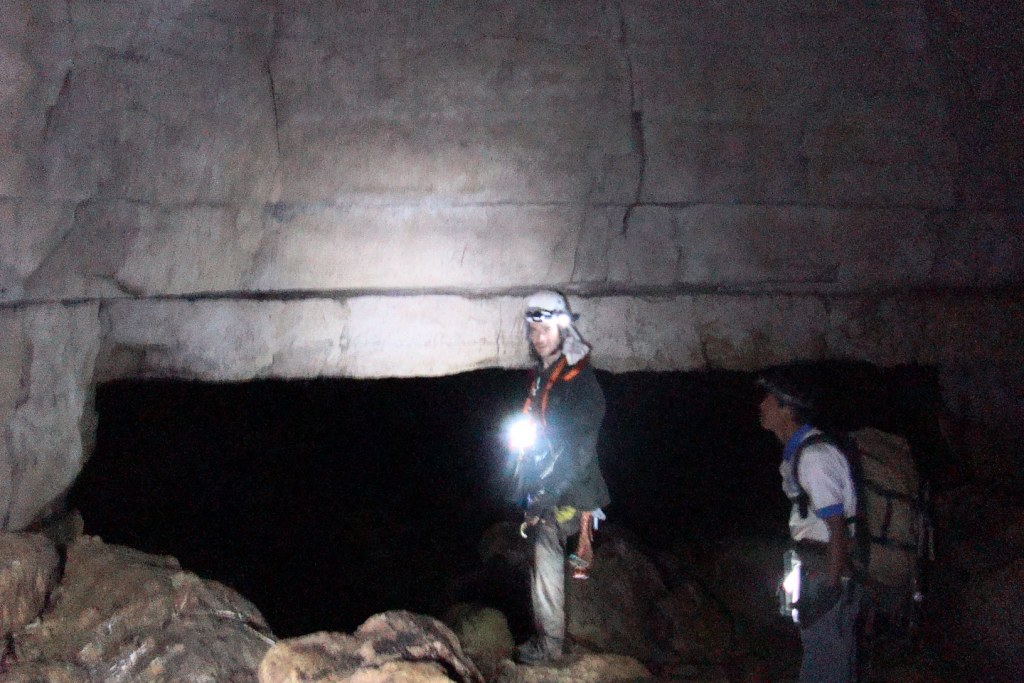
Los Tayos Cave (Ecuador). Limestone wall with horizontal stratification and vertical joints. You can see the one that leads to the South passing to the main room of the Cave. In the photo Luis Tunki and Yoris Jarzynski on the Polish expedition

Cueva de los Tayos (Spanish, "Cave of the Oilbirds") is a cave on the eastern slopes of the Andes Mountains in the Morona-Santiago province of Ecuador. It owes its name to being the home of the native nocturnal birds called tayos (Steatornis caripensis), which live in numerous caves in the Andean jungles of South America.

The location became the focus of a popular myth perpetuated by Erich von Däniken about a hidden library of golden plates inscribed with hieroglyphs, variously ascribed to extraterrestrial beings or a lost human civilization. Despite numerous scientific and pseudoscientific expeditions, including one in 1976 that included American astronaut and engineer Neil Armstrong, the library has not been found. No evidence for the library has been found, and archaeologists generally regard it as a hoax.

== Description ==
Cueva de los Tayos is in the high rainforest, 2 kilometres (1.2 mi) south of the Santiago River, and 800 metres (2,600 ft) west of the Coangos River. The entrance to the cave has a vertical void of 70 meters and local people were aware of this cave for centuries. According to a GPS measurement in 2008, its altitude is 539 metres (1,768 ft) above sea level. The principal entrance is within a rainforest at the bottom of a dry valley at an elevation of about 800 metres (2,600 ft) within thinly-bedded limestone and shale. The largest of three entrances is a 65 metres (213 ft) deep shaft leading to 4.6 kilometres (2.9 mi) of spacious passages and a chamber measuring 90 by 240 metres (300 by 790 ft). The cave has a vertical range of 201 metres (659 ft) with its lowest point ending in a sump. It is currently (2023) the longest cave in Ecuador.

The cave is used by the native Shuar people who descend into the cave each spring using vine ladders and bamboo torches to collect fledgling oilbirds ("guácharos" or "tayos" in Spanish). Written references to the cave go back as far as 1860 and it was visited by gold-seekers and military personnel in the 1960s.

The cave is inside the Sindical Center Coangos (formed by native people). The caves are not fully explored yet and local Shuar Indians have in-depth knowledge of the cave and they act as guides for cave explorers.

Access to the cave is restricted. It is necessary to obtain permission (access and temporary visit) and pay a tax (designated to improve the communities) in Sucúa, Ecuador, at the Shuar Center Federation. (FICSH: Federación Interprovincial de Centros Shuar)

== The "golden library" myth ==
Janos ‘Juan’ Móricz was a Hungarian explorer who first reportedly discovered a "golden library" in the caves sometime in the 1960s. He was interested in the Thule Society, a German occult group, and had possible connections to the Nazi pseudo-scientific organization, the Ahnenerbe. He believed that Magyars, ancient Hungarians, traveled from Eastern Europe and reached South America through the Pacific by use of the lost continent of Lemuria.

Móricz's essay, El Origen Americano de Pueblos Europeos (Spanish, "The American origin of European peoples") argues that the indigenous languages of South America share words with ancient Magyar and this supports his idea that South America is the cultural birthplace of humanity. The Golden Library is the last remnant of this ancient Magyar society. He claims that one of the caverns in the cave contains a polished stone desk with large books made of gold. Móricz describes the books as having "engraved hieroglyphs" and would later assign the writing as Phoenician and cuneiform. During this first encounter with the Golden Library, four aliens spoke telepathically to him congratulating for his 'wit' in getting into the cavern. He never gave an exact location to the metallic library and demanded that anyone wanting to verify his claims give him money.

Móricz's evidence for his Magyar hyperdiffusion claim has been debunked by others and has been accepted as Móricz's search for a long-lost white race in the Americas.

=== Jaramillo's account ===
Captain Petronio Jaramillo Abarca states that his childhood Shuar friend and their father had shown him the Golden Library. He states that the caves had a large number of carved stone animals and a large crystal coffin that stores a nine-foot-tall golden human skeleton. Jaramillo describes the Golden Library as "shelves made of yellow metal [that had] hundreds of huge books made of a golden metal". The books resembled geometry books according to him. The descriptions of the Golden Library differ from each account. Jaramillo would later describe the Golden Library as having Magyar writings. Jaramillo's wife states that she never believed her husband. She says "I knew it wasn't true [...] it isn't true he grew up as a child with [the Shuar]".

=== The 1968 Mormon Expedition ===
A group of Mormons came to believe that the metal plates that Móricz claimed were in the cave were the same golden plates described in the book of the Prophet Joseph Smith. The Mormons requested Móricz's guidance in the expedition, but he never took the Mormons to the supposed 'Golden Library'. According to Avril Jesperson, one of the people in the Mormon expedition, Móricz didn't know what he was doing, "It seemed this was the first trip Móricz took to the area". Jesperson reiterates his claim years later, believing that Móricz had never been to the caves and had never seen the supposed Golden Library.

=== The Gold of the Gods ===
A 1969 expedition to the cave is described in Pino Turolla's 1970 book Beyond the Andes. Erich von Däniken wrote in his 1973 book The Gold of the Gods that János Juan Móricz (1923–1991) had claimed to have explored Cueva de los Tayos in 1969 and discovered mounds of gold, unusual sculptures, and a metallic library. These items were said to be in artificial tunnels that had been created by a lost civilization with help from extraterrestrial beings. Von Däniken had previously claimed in his 1968 book, Chariots of the Gods?, that extraterrestrials were involved in ancient civilizations. Von Däniken's account of Móricz's discoveries was not supported by later investigation; the 1976 expedition found no evidence for his more exotic claims.

=== 1976 BCRA expedition ===
As a result of the claims published in von Däniken's book, an investigation of Cueva de los Tayos was organized by Stan Hall, an amateur archeologist from Scotland, in 1976. One of the largest and most expensive cave explorations ever undertaken, the expedition involved over a hundred people, including experts in a variety of fields, British and Ecuadorian military personnel, a film crew, and former American astronaut Neil Armstrong.

The team also included eight experienced British cavers who thoroughly explored the cave and conducted an accurate survey to produce a detailed map of it. This expedition was financed by the Governments of Ecuador and the United Kingdom. There was no evidence of Von Däniken's more exotic claims, although some physical features of the cave did approximate his descriptions, and some items of zoological, botanical, and archaeological interest were found. The team found passageways cut neatly and polished deep inside the cave and also burial sites dating back to 1500 BCE The lead researcher met with Moricz's indigenous source, who claimed that they had investigated the wrong cave and that the real cave was secret. Deep inside the cave, there are square shaped rock cuttings and rock structures resembling elongated doors and that portion is called Moricz portal.

Hall never claims to have seen the Golden Library. He, however, repeats their claims that golden plates lie in Tayos Caves. Hall states in an interview with Alex Chionetti "Not only do I believe with all my heart [that the Golden Library] exists, but beyond being a unique treasure, I believe it is a chapter of the history of South America". Hall also states he believes that, despite admitting to having never seen the library, there are two libraries, housing thousands of golden books.

=== 2018 Expedition Unknown episode ===
On 31 January 2018, Tayos Cave was featured on the 6th episode of the 4th season of Expedition Unknown, titled "Hunt for the Metal Library". Explorer Josh Gates and his team, helped by local Shuar and Eileen Hall, daughter of Stan Hall of the earlier expedition, headed to Ecuador to explore the depths of the cavern.
