= Sitno, Szczecinek County =

Sitno
- Village
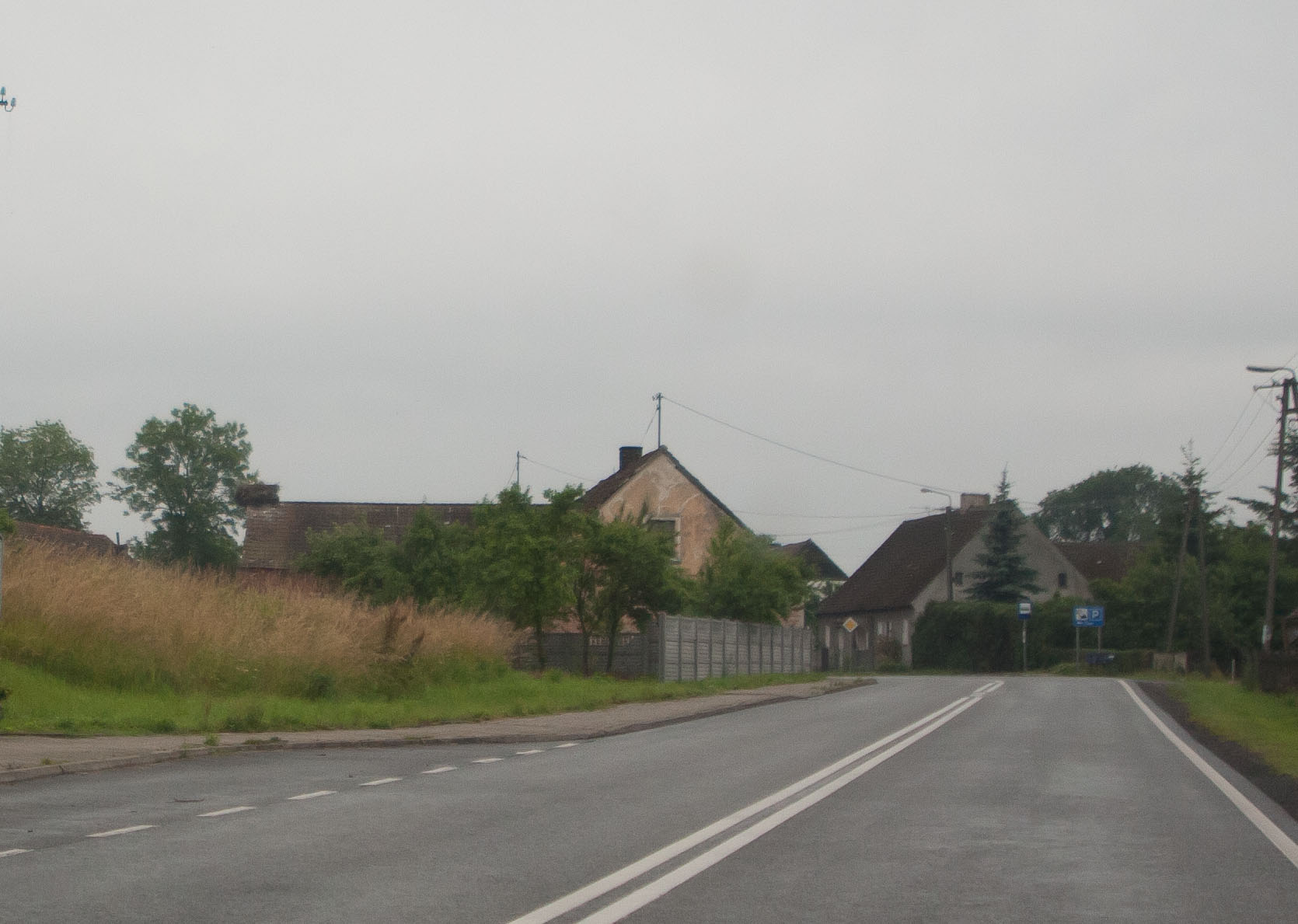

- Location within Poland
- Coordinates: 53°39′N 16°40′E
- Country: Poland
- Voivodeship: West Pomeranian
- County: Szczecinek
- Gmina: Szczecinek
- Time zone: UTC+1 (CET)
  - Summer (DST): UTC+2 (CEST)
- Vehicle registration: ZSZ

Sitno [ˈɕitnɔ] (German: Hütten bei Gellin) is a village in the administrative district of Gmina Szczecinek, within Szczecinek County, located in West Pomeranian Voivodeship, north-western Poland. It lies approximately 8 km (5 mi) south of Szczecinek and 141 km (88 mi) east of the regional capital Szczecin.

== Notable residents ==
- Karl Albrecht Schachtschneider (born 1940)
