= Karl Albrecht Schachtschneider =

Karl Albrecht Schachtschneider (born 11 July 1940, in Hütten bei Gellin, Province of Pomerania, Germany (now Sitno, Szczecinek County, West Pomeranian Voivodeship, Poland) is a Professor Emeritus in Public Law at University of Erlangen in Nuremberg, Germany.

He has been a strong critic of the European Union and recently the Lisbon Treaty.

== Publications, work and references ==
- Der Rechtsweg zum Bundesverfassungsgericht in Bund-Länder-Streitigkeiten. Juristische Fakultät der Freien Universität Berlin [West]. Teildruck. Berlin [West] 1969, XXX S., S. 119–184 (Dissertation vom 8. Juli 1969).
- Das Sozialprinzip. Zu seiner Stellung im Verfassungssystem des Grundgesetzes. 1974
- Staatsunternehmen und Privatrecht. Kritik der Fiskustheorie, exemplifiziert an § 1 UWG. Walter de Gruyter, Berlin 1986, ISBN 3-11-010141-6.
- Res publica res populi. Grundlegung einer Allgemeinen Republiklehre. Ein Beitrag zur Freiheits-, Rechts- und Staatslehre. Duncker und Humblot, Berlin 1994, ISBN 3-428-08124-2.
- unter Mitarbeit von Olaf Gast: Sozialistische Schulden nach der Revolution. Kritik der Altschuldenpolitik. Ein Beitrag zur Lehre von Recht und Unrecht, Duncker und Humblot, Berlin 1996.
- mit Wilhelm Hankel, Wilhelm Nölling und Joachim Starbatty: Die Euro-Klage. Warum die Währungsunion scheitern muß. Rowohlt Taschenbuch, Reinbek bei Hamburg 1998, ISBN 3-499-22395-3
- mit Angelika Emmerich-Fritsche: Recht der Vertragsärzte des Sozialgesetzbuches V, 1999
- mit Richard Fuchs: Spenden was uns nicht gehört. Das Transplantationsgesetz und die Verfassungsklage. Rotbuch Verlag, Hamburg 1999, ISBN 3-434-53042-8
- mit Wilhelm Hankel, Wilhelm Nölling, Joachim Starbatty: Die Euro-Illusion. Ist Europa noch zu retten?. Rowohlt Taschenbuch, Reinbek bei Hamburg 2001, ISBN 3-499-23085-2
- unter Mitarbeit von Angelika Emmerich-Fritsche, Dagmar I. Siebold, Peter Wollenschläger: Einführung in das Wirtschaftsverwaltungsrecht. 2001/2002
- mit Wilhelm Hankel und Angelika Emmerich-Fritsche: Revolution der Krankenversicherung. Prinzipien, Thesen und Gesetz. Hansebuch Verlag, Hamburg 2002, ISBN 3-934880-05-3.
- mit Beiträgen auch von Wilhelm Hankel, Angelika Emmerich-Fritsche, Andreas G. Scherer, Dagmar I. Siebold, Udo Wartha: Rechtsfragen der Weltwirtschaft. Duncker und Humblot, Berlin 2002, ISBN 3-428-10799-3.
- Fallstudien zum Öffentlichen Wirtschaftsrecht. 4. Aufl., Lehrstuhl für öffentliches Recht, Nürnberg 2005.
- Steuerverfassungsrechtliche Probleme der Betriebsaufspaltung und der verdeckten Gewinnausschüttung. Rechtsgrundsätze versus Gerichtspraxis. Duncker und Humblot, Berlin 2004
- Der Anspruch auf materiale Privatisierung. Am Beispiel des staatlichen und kommunalen Vermessungswesens in Bayern. Duncker und Humblot, Berlin 2005, ISBN 3-428-11026-9.
- Prinzipien des Rechtsstaates. Duncker und Humblot, Berlin 2006, ISBN 3-428-12206-2.
- Freiheit in der Republik. Duncker & Humblot, Berlin 2007, ISBN 978-3-428-12343-8.
