= Eva Herman =

German author and former television presenter (born 1958)

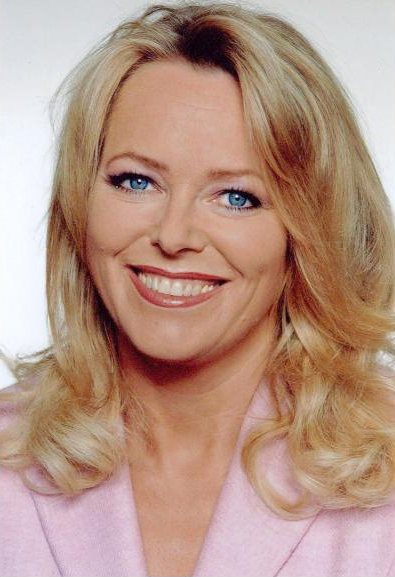
- Herman in 2009
- Born: Eva Feldker; 9 November 1958 (age 67); Emden, West Germany
- Other names: Eva Bischoff
- Occupations: Author, television presenter

Eva Bischoff (née Feldker; 9 November 1958), known as Eva Herman, is a German author and former television presenter. She worked as a news presenter on the nationwide Tagesschau news programme from 1989 to 2006 and also presented various other television programmes for the Norddeutscher Rundfunk until 2007. In 2003, an opinion poll by TNS Emnid declared Herman to be "Germany's favourite presenter".

Starting in 2006, Herman authored multiple books that were critical of feminism and advocated for traditional female gender roles. Her books were met with widespread criticism and media scrutiny. In 2007, Herman was dismissed from her position as a news anchor at German national broadcaster ARD, after positively reviewing the family policies and gender roles of Nazi Germany. Since that, she and her partner Andreas Popp are promoting various conspiracy theories.

== Controversies ==
In 2006 and 2007, Herman published two controversially received books regarding to her beliefs on gender roles and family policy. Herman strongly believes in traditional gender roles. Her article "Die Emanzipation - ein Irrtum?" (Emancipation - a fallacy?) describes her opinions on why birth rates continuously drop in Germany: Herman believes the feminist movement forces women out of their natural place in traditional families. Her understanding of female emancipation is that it calls for women to become like men. She refers to working as a 'masculine' attribute, and warns that although women can pursue talents outside the home in moderation, working outside of the home for too long puts women at risk of becoming 'masculine beings', and thus less interested in starting families.

In 2007, during an event intended to promote her second book Das Prinzip Arche Noah. Warum wir die Familie retten müssen (The Noah's Ark principle. Why we have to save the family), Herman criticized the German student movement of 1968. She alleged that the movement specifically devalued traditional female gender roles and spoke favorably about the image of motherhood, family values and community solidarity in Nazi Germany. On 8 September 2007, Herman was dismissed from her position at public TV broadcaster Norddeutscher Rundfunk with immediate effect, after defending her statements to its program director Volker Herres.

In August 2015, Herman published a conspiracy theory that claimed the European migrant crisis was orchestrated by "powerful people in the finance sector" to eradicate the white, Christian population of Europe and claimed that the September 11 attacks were a hoax.

On 20 April 2016, Herman was found guilty of evading €40,000 of income taxes in 2010. She was ordered to pay a reduced fine of €5,400, as she had already paid back her liabilities.

=== German colony in Canada ===
Research by Spiegel in July 2020 revealed that Herman, together with her partner Andreas Popp and Frank Eckhardt, is building a colony with hundreds of German right-wing radicals and conspiracy theorists on the Canadian island of Cape Breton. To this end, overpriced real estate is offered to the participants at their "Wissensmanufaktur" seminar site several times a year, right-wing ideas are conveyed and immigration is promoted. Herman and Popp deny their involvement in the project.

== Publications ==
Fiction

- Dann kamst du, Hoffmann und Campe, Hamburg 2001, ISBN 3-455-02770-9
- Aber Liebe ist es nicht, Hoffmann und Campe, Hamburg 2002, ISBN 3-455-02771-7

Non-fiction

- Fernsehfrauen in Deutschland. Im Gespräch mit Eva Herman, Krüger, Frankfurt a. M. 2001, ISBN 3-8105-0930-2
- Vom Glück des Stillens. Körpernähe und Zärtlichkeit zwischen Mutter und Kind. Hoffmann und Campe, Hamburg 2003, ISBN 3-455-09405-8
- Eva Herman, Stephan Valentin: Mein Kind schläft durch - der natürliche Weg zu ruhigen Nächten für Groß und Klein. Econ, Berlin 2005, ISBN 3-430-14462-0
- Das Eva-Prinzip. Für eine neue Weiblichkeit, Pendo, Starnberg 2006, ISBN 3-86612-105-9
- Gedanken zu Brustkrebs, Eva Herman ist "Schirmherrin" der Firmenschrift des Pharmakonzerns Hoffmann La Roche. Ars tempi, Köln 2006, ISBN 3-00-018629-8
- Liebe Eva Herman! Briefe und Mails an die Autorin des Eva-Prinzips. Pendo, Zürich, Munich 2007, ISBN 3-86612-125-3
- Das Prinzip Arche Noah. Warum wir die Familie retten müssen. Pendo, Zürich, Munich 2007, ISBN 3-86612-133-4
- Das Überlebensprinzip. Warum wir die Schöpfung nicht täuschen können. Hänssler, Holzgerlingen 2008, ISBN 978-3-7751-4884-9
