= Tulli Papyrus =

Papyrus that some claim to be a transcription with evidence of alien life

The Tulli Papyrus is supposedly an Egyptian papyrus dating from the reign of Thutmose III. The claim originated in a letter published by Tiffany Thayer in Doubt, the Fortean Society magazine.

== Claims by Rachewiltz ==
In 1953, Italian Fortean Boris de Rachewiltz claimed to have found a 20 x 18cm papyrus document among the papers of Alberto Tulli, curator of the Egyptology department of the Vatican Museums, after his death. Rachewiltz wrote to Thayer, describing the document as an ancient testimony of flying saucers from the reign of Thutmose III (1479–1425 BCE), and providing a translation of "the best preserved and perhaps most interesting part": (Note: Brackets indicate correction of printing errors.)

In the year 22, third month of winter, sixth hour of the day (. . . 2 . . .) The scrib[e]s of the House of Life found it was a circle of fire thtat was coming in the sky. (Though) it had no head, the breath of its mouth (had) a foul odour. Its body 1 "rod" long and 1 "rod" large. It had no voice. Their hearts became confused through it, they laid themselves on their bellies (. . . 3 . . .) They went to the King . . ?) to report it. His Majesty ordered (. . . 4 . . .) has been examined (. . . 5 . . .) as to all which is written in the papyrus-rolls of the House of Life[.] His Majesty was meditating upon what happened. Now, after some days had passed over those things, Lo! they were more numerous than anything. They were shining in the sky more than the sun to the limits of the four supports of heaven (. . . 6 . . .) Powerful was the position of the fire circles. The army of the king looked on and His Majesty was in the midst of it. It was after supper. Thereupon they (i.e. the fire circles) went up higher directed to South. Fishes and volatiles fell down from the sky. (It was) a marvel never occurred since the foundation of this Land! Caused His Majesty to be brought incense to pacify the hearth (. . . 9 . . . To write?) what happened in the book of the House of Life (. . . 10 . . . to be remembered?) for the Eternity.

However, Rachewiltz later admitted to Gianfranco Nolli, Tulli's successor, that he had never seen any such papyrus himself, now claiming to have based his translation on notes taken by Tulli in 1934 after viewing the papyrus for a short while at the home of "Tano" (=Phokion J. Tanos?) in Cairo. In letters published in 1962 and 1971, Rachewiltz said that his original account, as published in Doubt, had been falsified by Thayer.

Giuseppe Botti attempted to gain access to the papyrus before his death in 1968, but never heard back from Tulli's brother (who had supposedly given Rachewiltz access).

== Criticism and hoax ==
Étienne Drioton, according to a report Rachewiltz attributed to Tulli's brother, believed that it was genuine but referred to a meteorite.

The text was quickly adopted by other UFO believers, but Gianfranco Nolli, Tulli's successor at the Vatican Museums, suspected that "Tulli was taken in and that the papyrus is a fake". Samuel Rosenberg, in his 1968 Condon Report, wrote that the papyrus had been plagiarized from the Book of Ezekiel and cited the Tulli Papyrus as an example of stories circulated among UFO book authors "taken from secondary and tertiary sources without any attempt to verify original sources", concluding that "all accounts of 'UFO-like sightings handed down through the ages are doubtful—until verified".

Ufologists Jacques Vallee and Chris Aubeck describe the papyrus as a "hoax" and "somewhat too convenient a find for the editors of Doubt magazine. In one stroke the text combines flying saucers a hot topic in the early 1950s with rains of fish and other animals, a staple of Fortean research since the phenomenon was famously popularized by the Society's founder, Charles Fort".

The supposed papyrus was probably copied from Egyptian Grammar (1927) by Alan Gardiner.
