= Chariots of the Gods? =

1968 book by Erich von Däniken

Chariots of the Gods? Unsolved Mysteries of the Past
- Cover of 1971 Bantam paperback edition, United States, in English
- Editor: Wilhelm Utermann as Wilhelm Roggersdorf
- Author: Erich von Däniken
- Original title: Erinnerungen an die Zukunft: Ungelöste Rätsel der Vergangenheit
- Language: German
- Publisher: Econ-Verlag (Germany), Putnam (US)
- Publication date: 1968
- Publication place: Germany
- Media type: Print
- Pages: 267
- Followed by: The Eyes of the Sphinx

Chariots of the Gods? Unsolved Mysteries of the Past (German: Erinnerungen an die Zukunft: Ungelöste Rätsel der Vergangenheit, lit. 'Memories of the Future: Unsolved Mysteries of the Past') is a book written in 1968 by Erich von Däniken and translated from the original German by Michael Heron. It involves the hypothesis that the technologies and religions of many ancient civilizations were given to them by ancient astronauts who were welcomed as gods.

The first draft of the publication had been rejected by a variety of publishers. The book was extensively rewritten by its editor, Wilhelm Roggersdorf (a pen name of the German screenwriter Wilhelm Utermann).

== Summary ==
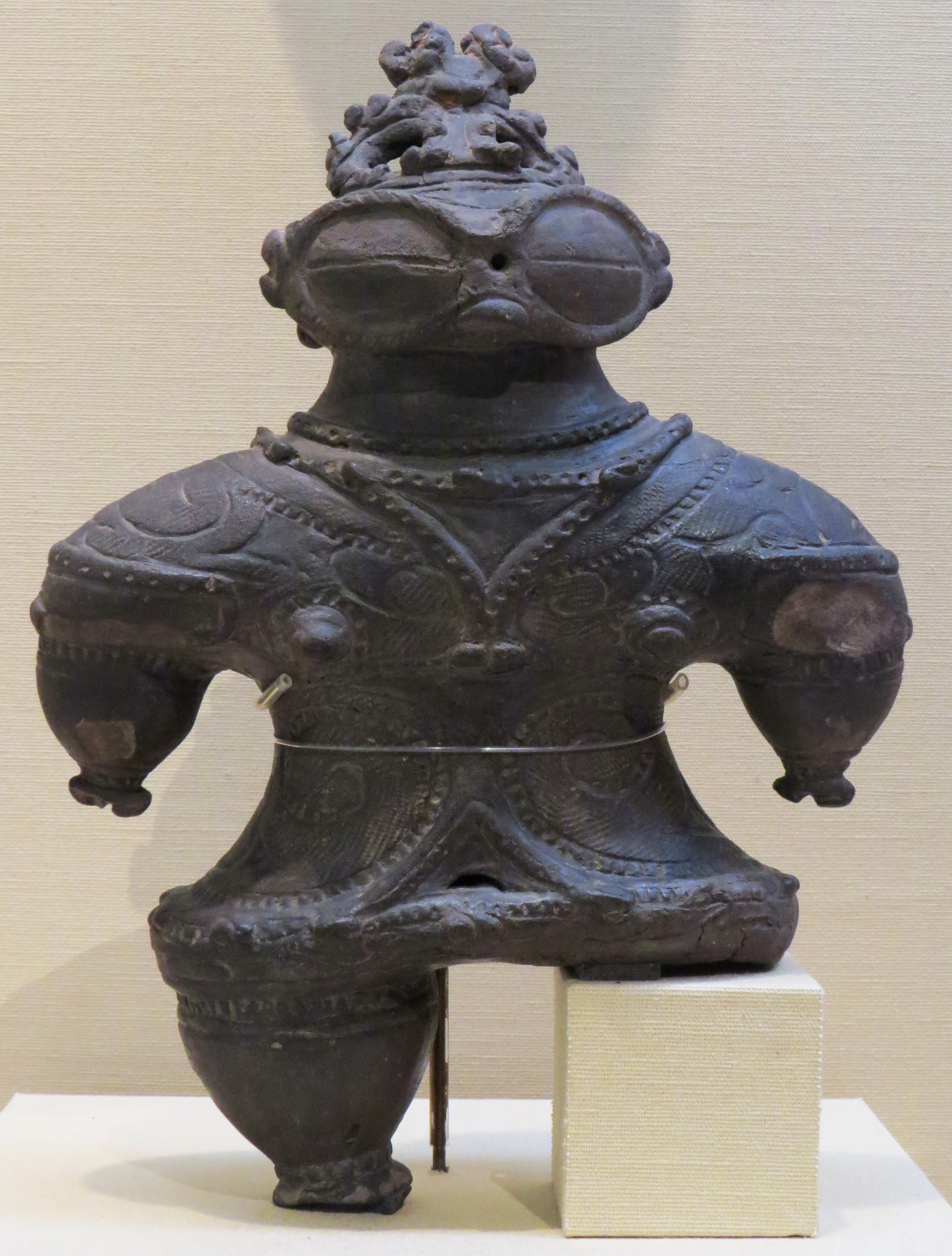
Statue from the late Jōmon period (1000–400 BCE) in Japan, interpreted by von Däniken as depicting an alien visitor

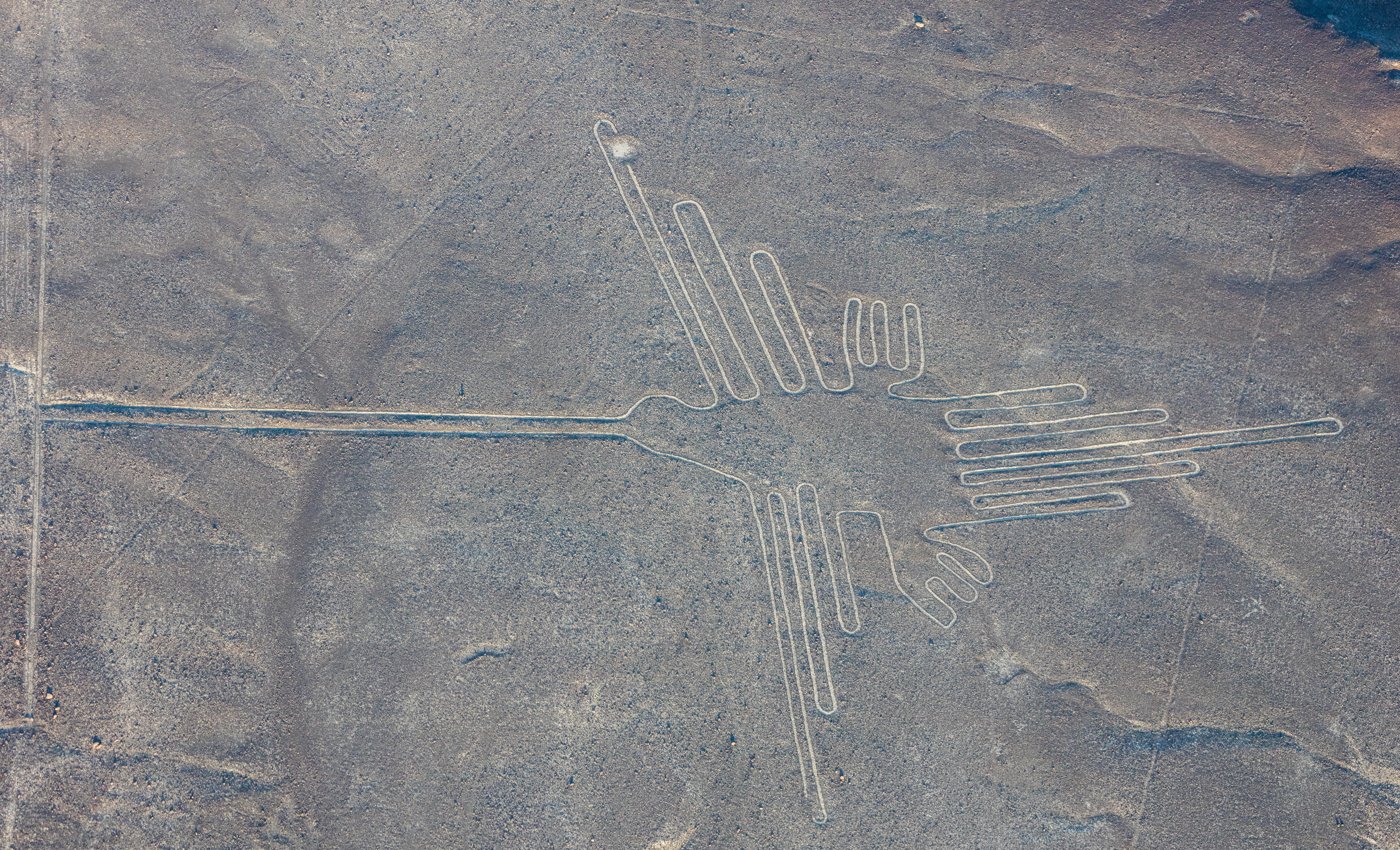
Von Däniken suggests that the Nazca lines (200 BCE – CE 700) in Peru could be "landing strips" for alien spacecraft

The main thesis of Chariots of the Gods is that extraterrestrial beings influenced ancient technology. Von Däniken suggests that some ancient structures and artifacts appear to reflect more sophisticated technological knowledge than is known or presumed to have existed at the times they were manufactured. Von Däniken maintains that these artifacts were produced either by extraterrestrial visitors or by humans who learned the necessary knowledge from extraterrestrials.

Such artifacts include the Egyptian pyramids, Stonehenge, and the Moai of Easter Island. Further examples include an early world map known as the Piri Reis map, which von Däniken describes as showing Earth as it is seen from space, and the Nazca Lines in Peru, which he suggests may have been constructed by humans as crude replicas of previous alien structures, as a way to call the aliens back to Earth. He uses this same explanation to argue that cart ruts in Malta may have had extraterrestrial purposes along with similar lines in Australia, Saudi Arabia, and the Aral Sea.

The book also suggests that ancient artwork throughout the world can be interpreted as depicting astronauts, air and space vehicles, extraterrestrials, and complex technology. Von Däniken describes elements that he believes are similar in the art of unrelated cultures. Among the artwork he describes are ancient Japanese Dogū figurines (which he believes to resemble astronauts in spacesuits) and 3,000-year-old carvings in an Egyptian New Kingdom Temple that appear to depict helicopter-like machines.

The book further suggests that the origins of many religions, including interpretations of the Old Testament of the Bible, are reactions to contact with an alien race. According to von Däniken, humans considered the technology of the aliens to be supernatural and the aliens themselves to be gods. Von Däniken asks if the oral and literal traditions of most religions contain references to visitors from stars and vehicles traveling through air and space. These, he says, should be interpreted as literal descriptions which have changed during the passage of time and become more obscure.

Examples include Ezekiel's vision of the angels and the wheels, which Von Däniken interprets as a description of a spacecraft; the Ark of the Covenant, which is explained as a device intended for communication with an alien race; and the destruction of Sodom by fire and brimstone, which is interpreted as a nuclear explosion. Von Däniken attempts to draw an analogy with the "cargo cults" that formed during and after World War II, when once-isolated tribes in the South Pacific mistook the advanced American and Japanese soldiers for gods.

Von Däniken also spends around one-third of the book discussing the possibility that humans could theoretically offer primitive civilizations on interstellar worlds advanced technology by the year 2100. This would, he writes, mimic the ancient extraterrestrial contact von Däniken believes to have occurred on Earth.

== Reception ==
=== Carl Sagan's response in "The Space Gods Revealed" ===
Astronomer and science communicator Carl Sagan also wrote a response to the book in a book published by Ronald Story in 1976 called The Space Gods Revealed, in which he criticised the book for its pseudoscience and sloppy thinking, stating that the book was largely religious in its arguments, relying on a group of all-powerful, all-knowing, all-benevolent creatures which came from the sky to save the human race from itself.

Sagan stated that because many people would not have seen mainstream criticisms of the book, that therefore many people may make the assumption that it is true, and that the arguments presented in the book were dangerous because, like a quack doctor would prevent people from being treated properly and may lead them into delusions about the state of their health, similarly people would view pseudoarcheology and make similarly incorrect conclusions about the history of the human species.

He also mentioned that he and other scientists took the concept of extraterrestrial intelligence seriously and that it should be subject to science and rationality and that despite how interesting the concept may be that our hopes and wishes should not cloud the reality of human history that archeology has helped uncover.

=== Academic responses ===
Von Däniken's book, and much of his subsequent publications such as Gods from Outer Space and The Gold of the Gods, have drawn largely negative receptions from the academic mainstream despite being popular best-sellers. Many scientists and historians have rejected his ideas, claiming that the book's conclusions were based on faulty, pseudoscientific evidence, some of which was later demonstrated to be fraudulent or fabricated, and under illogical premises.

An internationally bestselling book by Clifford Wilson, Crash Go the Chariots, was published in 1972. Ronald Story's 1976 book rebutting von Däniken's ideas was titled The Space Gods Revealed.

==== Professor Kenneth Feder's response in Frauds, Myths, and Mysteries (2018) ====
In 2018, a three-pronged response to the hypothesis was presented by Kenneth Feder, emeritus professor of archaeology at Central Connecticut State University, in his book Frauds, Myths, and Mysteries in the chapter "Gods In Fiery Chariots" in response to the book, outlining the three main claims it made with humorous headings within the chapter in response:

1. The Inkblot Hypothesis - Claims made that ancient drawings supposedly depicted advanced technologies from extraterrestrial visitors.
2. The Amorous Astronaut Hypothesis - Claims made that the biological development of humans cannot be explained without the involvement of a scientifically-advanced extraterrestrial civilisation.
3. The “Our Ancestors, the Dummies” Hypothesis - Related claim that the archeological record is replete with examples of said advanced technologies beyond the capabilities of ancient humans which were purposefully introduced to humans by extraterrestrial beings.

===== Response to claims of extraterrestrials from ancient petroglyphs and geoglyphs ("The inkblot hypothesis") =====
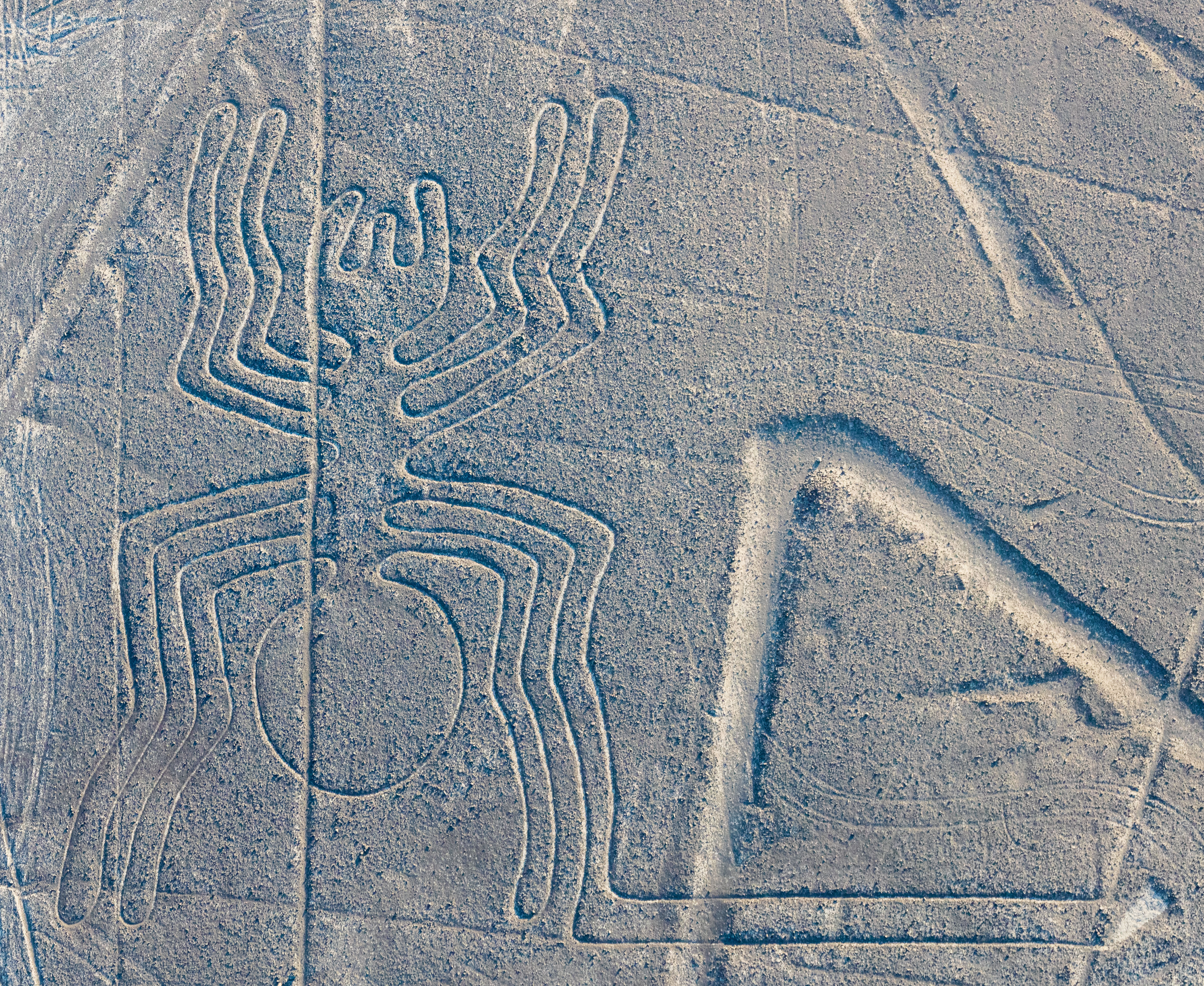
The Nazca Lines, an example provided in the book, were created by the Nazca peoples using a smaller figure which was then translated into coordinates over larger distances.

In The Inkblot Hypothesis, Feder's main argument against the claims presented is that Von Däniken's interpretations resemble more of a person describing a Rorschach test, in the sense that his explanation says more about what was going on in Von Däniken's mind rather than a sincere attempt to try to understand what was going on in the mind of the ancient humans who produced the drawings, arguing that Von Däniken does not attempt to take into account the religious, artistic or cultural context of the drawings which were produced and consumed within an entirely different culture.

Feder states that Von Däniken in his book interprets modern artifacts such as antennae or space helmets from 60s science fiction, rather than the far more likely depiction, of humans wearing deer antlers which is common among ancient humans in a variety of cultures.

In response to the claim of Nazca culture's Nazca lines of giant spiders being a clear indication of extraterrestrial intervention through the use of aircraft to direct their construction, Feder states that this ignores the large amounts of evidence present at the site which clearly outlined its social hierarchy which made possible the organisation of labor required to construct the geoglyphs which would have been directed by the Nazca elite class, located in another archeological site, La Muna.

Furthermore, he states that the claim of aircraft being used to direct their construction can easily be dismissed by Occam's razor because all sufficient evidence of their construction is already readily available in the site itself and in other archeological locations which easily explains the construction of the geoglyphs which does not point to extraterrestrial origins. Feder states again the importance of the religious, cultural and artistic context which is present in other similar sites which represent a tradition of large-scale earth drawings such as those also found in Peru, which were ceremonial roads which lead to their sacred origin places and which were used for religious and cultural ceremonies in several cultures across ancient Latin America.

The claim that an aircraft directed by extraterrestrials requires many more suppositions to be proven and that evidence does not exist for any of the suppositions provided, namely that: extraterrestrials visited earth, that they communicated with the Nazca people on land (without the use of airfields), then directed the construction of airfields, and then directed them to construct enormous representations of species on earth.

===== Response to claims of Mayan ruler Kʼinich Janaabʼ Pakal being an astronaut ("The inkblot hypothesis") =====
In Von Däniken's book, he claims that the figure of Mayan king Kʼinich Janaabʼ Pakal, depicted on a sarcophagus at the Mayan Temple of the Inscriptions in the ancient city of Palenque, is a depiction of an astronaut with an oxygen mask and antennae and is therefore an extraterrestrial astronaut. Feder's response to this is that as with the Nazca Lines, this is another example of Von Däniken's own interpretation of the image on the sarcophagus lid which lacks any understanding of Mayan culture, history, religious beliefs, art or cosmogony.

Feder states that the depiction is clear among scholars of Mayan cosmogony and culture that it depicts the king poised between life and death on his journey to the afterlife and that Von Däniken's book is wholly ignorant of the Mayan perspective or culture. Feder also cites the large amount of evidence that has been uncovered about the king, some of which had been detailed on the sarcophagus in question, including his ancestors, accomplishments during his time as ruler. Feder lamented that the story of Pakal did not need to be explained by extraterrestrial origins due to the large body of evidence in archeology and history which has detailed a vibrant history and image of the ruler.

=== Plagiarism controversies ===
Soon after the publication of Chariots of the Gods?, von Däniken was accused of stealing the ideas of French author Robert Charroux.

A 2004 article in Skeptic magazine states that von Däniken plagiarized many of the book's concepts from The Morning of the Magicians, that this book in turn was heavily influenced by the Cthulhu Mythos, and that the core of the ancient astronaut theory originates in H. P. Lovecraft's "The Call of Cthulhu" and At the Mountains of Madness.

=== Discredited artifact ===
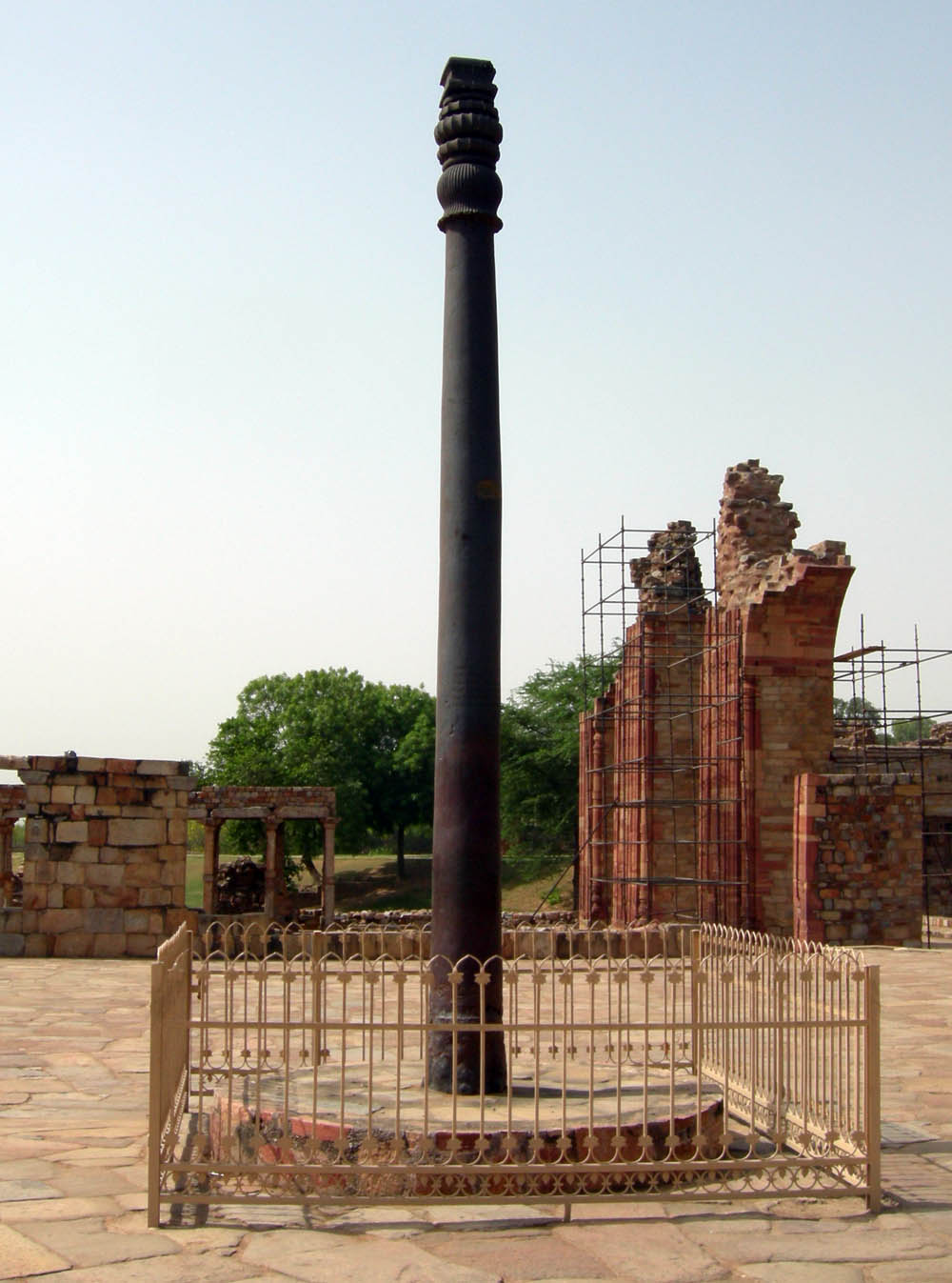
The iron pillar of Delhi, erected by Chandragupta II the Great, which von Däniken claimed did not rust

One artifact offered as evidence in the book has been disclaimed by von Däniken himself. Chariots asserts that a supposedly rust-free iron pillar in India was evidence of extraterrestrial influence, but von Däniken admitted in a Playboy interview that the pillar was man-made and that as far as supporting his theories goes "we can forget about this iron thing." Neither this nor any other discredited evidence, however, has been removed from subsequent editions of Chariots of the Gods?

=== Popular response ===
Chariots of the Gods? was on The New York Times bestseller list and helped to launch von Däniken's career as a public speaker. Von Däniken had sold 70 million copies of his books as of January 2017.

== Adaptations ==
The book was adapted as a German documentary film, Chariots of the Gods, produced by Terra-Filmkunst. The film was released in 1970 in West Germany and first appeared in the United States the following year. It was nominated for the Academy Award for Best Documentary Feature at the 43rd Academy Awards in 1971.

In 1972, an edited version of the film appeared as a TV documentary called In Search of Ancient Astronauts on NBC and was produced by Alan Landsburg Productions. The documentary was narrated by Rod Serling. A follow-up called In Search of Ancient Mysteries aired the following year, also narrated by Serling. The documentary series In Search Of..., which Leonard Nimoy hosted (Serling having died in 1975), was premiered on the basis of those two "pilot" films.

A different TV documentary, Horizon Special: The Case of the Ancient Astronauts directed by Graham Massey, was released in 1977 and examined von Däniken's claims.

In 1977, an eight part Polish comic adaptation of the book was created by Alfred Gorny, Arnold Mostowicz and artist Boguslaw Polch. The series was translated into 12 languages and the first four volumes were translated into English and released by Methuen Children’s Books. In 2015, the full 400 page story was released in Polish by Proszynski Media under the title Ekspedycja (“The Expedition”).

In 1993, von Däniken produced a 25-part series titled Auf den Spuren der All-Mächtigen (Pathways of the Gods) for German television station, Sat.1. In 1996, a one-hour television special called, Chariots Of The Gods – The Mysteries Continue, aired on ABC and was produced by ABC/Kane. ABC/Kane produced another television special with von Däniken the following year called The Mysterious World – Search for Ancient Technology. It aired on the Discovery Channel in the United States and on RTL in Germany.

The global media rights to the book have since been purchased by Media Invest Entertainment which is developing a "360-degree entertainment" franchise entitled Chariots of the Gods. Today, documentaries espousing alien mythology can be found on most streaming platforms and are plentiful on YouTube.

== Legacy ==
Chariots of the Gods? spawned multiple sequels, including Gods from Outer Space and The Gods Were Astronauts. The theory in the original book is said to have influenced a variety of science fiction books, films, and television series. For instance, it is considered the inspiration for the History Channel television series, Ancient Aliens.

The concept of ancient extraterrestrials has been used as a plot element in television shows and movies like Star Trek (which actually addressed the question before von Däniken's book was published), Stargate, The Thing, The X-Files, the Alien franchise (most notably, Prometheus), Neon Genesis Evangelion, Indiana Jones and the Kingdom of the Crystal Skull and The Eternals.

The book served as inspiration for the Frank Zappa song Inca Roads, as well as the album In Search of Ancient Gods by Absolute Elsewhere, a group consisting of Paul Fishman, Bill Bruford, Philip Saatchi, and Jon Astrop.

== See also ==
- Out-of-place artifact
- The Sirius Mystery
- Vimana
