= 2011 in basketball =

The following are the basketball events of the year 2011 throughout the world.

Tournaments include international (FIBA), professional (club) and amateur and collegiate levels.

== Tournaments ==
=== Men's tournaments ===
==== Olympic qualifiers ====
- 2011 FIBA Africa Championship – Antananarivo, Madagascar
  - (gold) Tunisia
  - (silver) Angola
  - (bronze) Nigeria
  - 4th Ivory Coast
- 2011 FIBA Americas Championship – Mar del Plata, Argentina.
  - (gold) Argentina
  - (silver) Brazil
  - (bronze) Dominican Republic
  - 4th Puerto Rico
- 2011 FIBA Oceania Championship – Australia
  - (gold) Australia
  - (silver) New Zealand
- EuroBasket 2011 – Lithuania
  - (gold) Spain
  - (silver) France
  - (bronze) Russia
  - 4th North Macedonia
- 2011 FIBA Asia Championship – Wuhan, China
  - (gold) China
  - (silver) Jordan
  - (bronze) South Korea
  - 4th Philippines

=== Women's tournaments ===
==== Olympic qualifiers ====
- 2011 FIBA Africa Championship for Women – Bamako, Mali
  - (gold) Angola
  - (silver) Senegal
  - (bronze) Mali
  - 4th Nigeria
- 2011 FIBA Americas Championship for Women – Neiva, Colombia.
  - (gold) Brazil
  - (silver) Argentina
  - (bronze) Canada
  - 4th Cuba
- 2011 FIBA Asia Championship for Women – Ōmura, Nagasaki, Japan
  - (gold) China
  - (silver) South Korea
  - (bronze) Japan
  - 4th Chinese Taipei
- EuroBasket Women 2011 – Poland
  - (gold) Russia
  - (silver) Turkey
  - (bronze) France
  - 4th Czech Republic
- 2011 FIBA Oceania Championship for Women – Australia
  - (gold) Australia
  - (silver) New Zealand

=== Youth tournaments ===
- 2011 FIBA Under-19 World Championship – Latvia
  - (gold) Lithuania
  - (silver) Serbia
  - (bronze) Russia
  - 4th Argentina
- 2011 FIBA Under-19 World Championship for Women – Chile
  - (gold) United States
  - (silver) Spain
  - (bronze) Brazil
  - 4th Australia

== Club championships ==
=== Continental championships ===
Men:

- Euroleague:
  - (gold) (Greece) Panathinaikos (silver) (Israel) Maccabi Tel Aviv (bronze) (Italy) Montepaschi Siena
- Eurocup:
  - (gold) (Russia) UNICS Kazan (silver) (Spain) Cajasol (bronze) (Croatia) Cedevita Zagreb
- EuroChallenge:
  - (gold) (Slovenia) Krka Novo Mesto (silver) (Russia) Lokomotiv–Kuban Krasnodar (bronze) (Belgium) Telenet Oostende
- Asia Champions Cup:
  - (gold) (Lebanon) Al-Riyadi Beirut (silver) (Iran) Mahram Tehran (bronze) (Qatar) Al-Rayyan
- Americas League:
  - (gold) (Argentina) Regatas Corrientes (silver) (Puerto Rico) Capitanes de Arecibo (bronze) (Mexico) Halcones UV Xalapa

Women:

- EuroLeague Women:
  - (gold) (Spain) Halcón Avenida Salamanca (silver) (Russia) Spartak Moscow Region (bronze) (Russia) UMMC Ekaterinburg

=== Transnational championships ===
- (United States) (Canada) NBA
  - Season:
    - Division champions: Boston Celtics (Atlantic), Chicago Bulls (Central), Miami Heat (Southeast), Oklahoma City Thunder (Northwest), Los Angeles Lakers (Pacific), San Antonio Spurs (Southwest)
    - Best regular-season record: Chicago Bulls (62–20)
    - Eastern Conference: Miami Heat
    - Western Conference: Dallas Mavericks
  - Finals: The Mavericks win their first NBA title, defeating the Heat 4–2 in the best-of-7 series. The Mavs' Dirk Nowitzki is named Finals MVP.
- (Australia) National Basketball League, 2010–11 season:
  - Premiers: New Zealand Breakers
  - Champions: The Breakers defeat the Cairns Taipans 2–1 in the best-of-three Grand Final, becoming the first New Zealand team to win an Australian national league title in any sport.
- (Bosnia and Herzegovina) (Croatia) (Czech Republic) (Montenegro) (Serbia) (Slovenia) Adriatic League, 2010–11 season: (Serbia) Partizan Belgrade defeat (Slovenia) Union Olimpija Ljubljana 77–74 in the one-off final.
- (Brunei) (Indonesia) (Malaysia) (Philippines) (Singapore) ASEAN Basketball League, 2010–11 season: Chang Thailand Slammers defeat (Philippines) Philippine Patriots 2–0 in the best-of-three finals.
- (Estonia) (Latvia) (Lithuania) (Sweden) Baltic League: (Lithuania) Žalgiris Kaunas defeat (Latvia) VEF Riga 75–67 in the one-off final.
- (Belarus) (Estonia) (Finland) (Latvia) (Lithuania) (Poland) (Russia) (Ukraine) VTB United League, 2010–11 season: (Russia) BC Khimki defeat (Russia) CSKA Moscow 66–64 in the one-off final.

=== National championships ===
Men:

- (Argentina) Liga Nacional de Básquet, 2010–11 season: Guangdong Southern Tigers
  - Regular season: Obras Sanitarias
  - Playoffs: Peñarol defeat Atenas 4–1 in the best-of-7 final.
- Basketball League Belgium: Spirou Charleroi sweep Okapi Aalstar 3–0 in the best-of-5 finals.
- Bosnia and Herzegovina Championship:
- (Brazil) Novo Basquete Brasil: UniCEUB/BRB Brasília defeat Franca 3–1 in the best-of-5 finals.
- (Bulgaria) Bulgarian National League: Lukoil Academic complete a 36–0 season in domestic play with a 3–0 sweep of Levski Sofia in the best-of-5 finals.
- (China) Chinese Basketball Association: 2010–11 season: Guangdong Southern Tigers defeat Xinjiang Flying Tigers 4–2 in the best-of-7 finals.
- (Croatia) Croatian League: KK Zagreb sweep Cedevita Zagreb 3–0 in the best-of-5 finals.
- (Czech Republic) Czech League: ČEZ Nymburk defeat Prostějov 4–2 in the best-of-7 finals.
- (Netherlands) Dutch Basketball League: ZZ Leiden defeat GasTerra Flames 4–3 in the best-of-7 finals.
- (Estonia) Estonian League, 2010–11: Kalev/Cramo sweep TÜ/Rock 4–0 in the best-of-7 final.
- (France) French Pro A League: Nancy defeat Cholet 76–74 in the one-off final.
- (Germany) German Bundesliga, 2010–11 season: Brose Baskets defeat ALBA Berlin 3–2 in the best-of-5 finals.
- (Greece) Greek League, 2010–11 season: Panathinaikos defeat Olympiacos 3–1 in the best-of-5 finals. Before the finals, Olympiacos had gone 36–0 in domestic competition this season.
- (Iran) Iranian Super League, 2010–11 season:
- (Israel) Israeli Super League, 2010–11 season: Maccabi Tel Aviv defeat Hapoel Gilboa Galil 91–64 in the one-off final.
- (Italy) Italian Serie A, 2010–11 season: Montepaschi Siena defeat Bennet Cantù 4–1 in the best-of-7 finals.
- (Latvia) Latvian League: VEF Riga defeat Ventspils 4–3 in the best-of-7 finals.
- (Lithuania) Lithuanian LKL: Žalgiris defeat Lietuvos Rytas 4–1 in the best-of-7 finals.
- Montenegro League:
- (Philippines) Philippine Basketball Association, 2010–11 season:
  - Philippine Cup: The Talk 'N Text Tropang Texters defeat the San Miguel Beermen 4–2 in the best-of-7 finals.
  - Commissioner's Cup: The Texters win their second trophy of the season, defeating the Barangay Ginebra Kings 4–2 in the best-of-7 finals.
  - Governors Cup: The Petron Blaze Boosters deny the Texters a Grand Slam, defeating them 4–3 in the best-of-7 finals.
- (Poland) Polish League: Asseco Prokom Gdynia defeat Turów Zgorzelec 4–3 in the best-of-7 finals.
- (Russia) Russian PBL: CSKA Moscow defeat Khimki 3–1 in the best-of-5 finals.
- League of Serbia, 2010–11 season: Partizan sweep Hemofarm 3–0 in the best-of-5 finals.
- (Slovenia) Slovenian League:
- (Spain) Spanish ACB:
  - Season: Regal FC Barcelona
  - Playoffs: Barça sweep Bizkaia Bilbao 3–0 in the best-of-5 finals.
- (Turkey) Turkish Basketball League: Fenerbahçe Ülker defeat Galatasaray Café Crown 4–2 in the best-of-7 finals.
- (Ukraine) Ukrainian SuperLeague: Budivelnyk defeat Donetsk 4–3 in the best-of-7 finals.
- (United Kingdom) British Basketball League, 2010–11:
  - Season: Mersey Tigers
  - Playoffs: The Tigers defeat the Sheffield Sharks 79–74 in the one-off final.
- Super Basketball League:Taiwan Beer defeat Dacin Tigers 4–1 in the best-of-7 finals.

Women:

- (United States) WNBA
  - Season:
    - Eastern Conference: Indiana Fever
    - Western Conference: Minnesota Lynx
  - Finals: The Lynx win their first WNBA title, sweeping the Fever 3–0 in the best-of-5 series. The Lynx' Seimone Augustus is named Finals MVP.

=== College ===
Men

- (United States) NCAA
  - Division I: Connecticut 53, Butler 41
    - Most Outstanding Player: Kemba Walker, Connecticut
  - National Invitation Tournament: Wichita State 66, Alabama 57
  - College Basketball Invitational: Oregon defeated Creighton 2–1 in the best-of-3 final.
  - CollegeInsider.com Tournament: Santa Clara 76, Iona 69
  - Division II: Bellarmine 71, BYU–Hawaiʻi 68
  - Division III: St. Thomas (MN) 78, Wooster 54
- (United States) NAIA
  - NAIA Division I: Pikeville 83, Mountain State 76 (OT)
  - NAIA Division II: Cornerstone 80, Saint Francis (IN) 71
- (United States) NJCAA
  - Division I:
  - Division II: Lincoln College (Lincoln, Illinois)74, Mott Community College (Flint, Michigan) 67
  - Division III:
- (Philippines) UAAP Men's: Ateneo defeated FEU 2–0 in the best-of-3 finals
- NCAA (Philippines) Seniors': San Beda defeated San Sebastian 2–0 in the best-of-3 finals

Women

- (United States) NCAA
  - Division I: Texas A&M 76, Notre Dame 70
    - Most Outstanding Player: Danielle Adams, Texas A&M
  - WNIT: Toledo 76, USC 68
  - Women's Basketball Invitational: UAB 68, Cal State Bakersfield 60
  - Division II: Clayton State 69, Michigan Tech 50
  - Division III: Amherst 64, Washington (MO) 55
- (United States) NAIA
  - NAIA Division I:
  - NAIA Division II women's basketball championship:
- (United States) NJCAA
  - Division I:North Idaho College 90, Trinity Valley Community College 81
  - Division II:Monroe College 78, Lake Michigan College 73
  - Division III:Anoka-Ramsey Community College 60, Roxbury Community College 55
- (Philippines) UAAP Women's: FEU defeated Adamson Falcons 2–1 in the best-of-3 finals

=== Prep ===
- (United States) USA Today Boys Basketball Ranking #1: St. Anthony High School (New Jersey)
- (United States) USA Today Girls Basketball Ranking #1:
- NCAA (Philippines) Juniors: San Beda defeated LSGH 2–1 in the best-of-5 finals, with San Beda having a 1–0 advantage
- (Philippines) UAAP Juniors: NU defeated FEU-FERN 2–1 in the best-of-3 finals

== Awards and honors ==
=== Naismith Memorial Basketball Hall of Fame ===
- Class of 2011:
  - Players: Teresa Edwards, Artis Gilmore, Chris Mullin, Dennis Rodman, Arvydas Sabonis, Reece "Goose" Tatum
  - Coaches: Herb Magee, Tara VanDerveer, Tex Winter
  - Contributors: Tom "Satch" Sanders

=== Women's Basketball Hall of Fame ===
- Class of 2011
  - Val Ackerman
  - Ruthie Bolton
  - Vicky Bullett
  - Muffet McGraw
  - Pearl Moore
  - Lometa Odom

=== Professional ===
- Men
  - NBA Most Valuable Player Award: Derrick Rose, Chicago Bulls
  - NBA Rookie of the Year Award: Blake Griffin, Los Angeles Clippers
  - NBA Defensive Player of the Year Award: Dwight Howard, Orlando Magic
  - NBA Sixth Man of the Year Award: Lamar Odom, Los Angeles Lakers
  - NBA Most Improved Player Award: Kevin Love, Minnesota Timberwolves
  - NBA Sportsmanship Award: Stephen Curry, Golden State Warriors
  - NBA Coach of the Year Award: Tom Thibodeau, Chicago Bulls
  - J. Walter Kennedy Citizenship Award: Ron Artest, Los Angeles Lakers
  - NBA Executive of the Year Award: Gar Forman, Chicago Bulls and Pat Riley, Miami Heat
  - FIBA Europe Player of the Year Award: Dirk Nowitzki, Germany and Dallas Mavericks
  - Euroscar Award: Dirk Nowitzki, Germany and Dallas Mavericks
  - Mr. Europa:
- Women
  - WNBA Most Valuable Player Award: Tamika Catchings, Indiana Fever
  - WNBA Defensive Player of the Year Award: Sylvia Fowles, Chicago Sky
  - WNBA Rookie of the Year Award: Maya Moore, Minnesota Lynx
  - WNBA Sixth Woman of the Year Award: DeWanna Bonner, Phoenix Mercury
  - WNBA Most Improved Player Award: Kia Vaughn, New York Liberty
  - Kim Perrot Sportsmanship Award: Sue Bird, Seattle Storm and Ruth Riley, San Antonio Silver Stars
  - WNBA Coach of the Year Award: Cheryl Reeve, Minnesota Lynx
  - WNBA All-Star Game MVP: Swin Cash, Seattle Storm
  - WNBA Finals Most Valuable Player Award: Seimone Augustus, Minnesota Lynx
  - FIBA Europe Player of the Year Award: Alba Torrens, Spain, Perfumerías Avenida, and Galatasaray Medical Park

=== Collegiate ===
- Combined
  - Legends of Coaching Award: Tom Izzo, Michigan State
- Men
  - John R. Wooden Award: Jimmer Fredette, BYU
  - Naismith College Coach of the Year: Steve Fisher, San Diego State
  - Frances Pomeroy Naismith Award: Jacob Pullen, Kansas State
  - Associated Press College Basketball Player of the Year: Jimmer Fredette, BYU
  - NCAA basketball tournament Most Outstanding Player: Anthony Davis, Kentucky
  - USBWA National Freshman of the Year: Jared Sullinger, Ohio State
  - Associated Press College Basketball Coach of the Year: Mike Brey, Notre Dame
  - Naismith Outstanding Contribution to Basketball: Dick Enberg
- Women
  - John R. Wooden Award: Maya Moore, Connecticut
  - Naismith College Player of the Year: Maya Moore, Connecticut
  - Naismith College Coach of the Year: Tara VanDerveer, Stanford
  - Wade Trophy: Maya Moore, Connecticut
  - Frances Pomeroy Naismith Award: Courtney Vandersloot, Gonzaga
  - Associated Press Women's College Basketball Player of the Year: Maya Moore, Connecticut
  - NCAA basketball tournament Most Outstanding Player: Danielle Adams, Texas A&M
  - Basketball Academic All-America Team: Maya Moore, UConn
  - Kay Yow Award: Matt Bollant, Green Bay
  - Carol Eckman Award: Joanne Boyle, California
  - Maggie Dixon Award: Stephanie Glance, Illinois State
  - USBWA National Freshman of the Year: Odyssey Sims, Baylor
  - Associated Press College Basketball Coach of the Year: Geno Auriemma, Connecticut
  - Associated Press College Basketball Coach of the Year: Katie Meier, Miami (FL)
  - Associated Press College Basketball Coach of the Year: Tara VanDerveer, Stanford
  - List of Senior CLASS Award women's basketball winners: Maya Moore, Connecticut
  - Nancy Lieberman Award: Courtney Vandersloot, Gonzaga
  - Naismith Outstanding Contribution to Basketball: Cheryl Miller

== Events ==
- On June 1, Shaquille O'Neal announced his retirement from basketball after 19 seasons and four world championships. O'Neal made the announcement on his Twitter page.
- On July 1, the collective bargaining agreement between the NBA and its players union expires, and the league immediately imposes a lockout of its players.
- On July 20, Yao Ming officially announced his retirement from basketball after nine seasons and a series of foot and ankle injuries. Yao has been credited with fueling greatly increased interest in the NBA in his home country of China since his selection as the #1 overall pick in the 2002 NBA draft.
- On September 26, New Jersey Nets minority owner Jay-Z announced that the team would change its name to the Brooklyn Nets when it moves to its new arena for the 2012–13 season.

== Movies ==
- The Fab Five – an ESPN Films documentary about the 1990s Michigan Wolverines players known collectively as the Fab Five: Chris Webber, Jalen Rose, Juwan Howard, Jimmy King, and Ray Jackson
- Off the Rez – a TLC documentary chronicling the high school career of current University of Louisville women's player Shoni Schimmel, a Native American who grew up on an Oregon reservation
- Runnin' Rebels of UNLV – a Home Box Office documentary chronicling the UNLV men's team's success in the late 1980s through early 1990s
- Salaam Dunk
- Unguarded – an ESPN Films documentary about former NBA player Chris Herren, including his struggle with and ongoing recovery from drug addiction

== Deaths ==
- January 12 — Howard Engleman, All-American player and interim head coach for the Kansas Jayhawks men's basketball team (born 1919)
- January 16 — Guðmundur Þorsteinsson, Icelandic national team player and coach (born 1942)
- February 2 — Roger Strickland, NBA player (Baltimore Bullets) (born 1940)
- February 4 — Lee Winfield, NBA player (Seattle SuperSonics, Buffalo Braves, Kansas City Kings) (born 1947)
- February 6 — Cesare Rubini, Italian coach and member of the Naismith Memorial Basketball Hall of Fame (born 1923)
- February 20 — Troy Jackson, better known by his nickname "Escalade", streetball player for the AND1 Mixtape Tour (born 1976)
- March 4 — Ed Manning, NBA and ABA player and father of 1988 #1 overall NBA Draft pick Danny Manning (born 1943)
- March 7 — Rudy Salud, former commissioner of the Philippine Basketball Association (born 1938)
- March 22 — Edgar Lacey, ABA player (Los Angeles Stars) and national champion at UCLA (born 1944)
- April 2 — Larry Finch, college coach and player (Memphis) (born 1951)
- April 10 — Bob Shaw, American NBL player (born 1921)
- April 14 — Joe Dan Gold, college player and coach (Mississippi State) (born 1942)
- April 15 — Beryl Shipley, college coach (Southwestern Louisiana) (born 1926)
- May 11 — Robert Traylor, NBL and NBA player (Milwaukee Bucks, Cleveland Cavaliers, Charlotte Hornets) (born 1977)
- May 27 — Margo Dydek, Polish WNBA player (Utah Starzz, San Antonio Silver Stars, Connecticut Sun, Los Angeles Sparks) (born 1974)
- June 6 — Bill Closs, NBA player (Philadelphia Warriors, Fort Wayne Pistons) (born 1922)
- June 9 — Mike Mitchell, NBA player (Cleveland Cavaliers, San Antonio Spurs) (born 1956)
- June 15 — Marshall Rogers, NBA player (Golden State Warriors) and the 1976 NCAA Division I season scoring leader (born 1953)
- June 27 — Lorenzo Charles, NBA player (Atlanta Hawks) famous for hitting the game-winning shot of the 1983 NCAA tournament for NC State (born 1963)
- July 1 — Bob McCann, NBA player (five teams) (born 1964)
- July 5 — Neil Dougherty, college coach (TCU) (born 1961)
- July 5 — Armen Gilliam, NBA player (six teams) (born 1964)
- July 9 — Don Ackerman, NBA player (New York Knicks) (born 1930)
- July 16 — Joe McNamee, NBA player (Rochester Royals, Baltimore Bullets) (born 1926)
- July 30 — Bob Peterson, NBA player (Baltimore Bullets, Milwaukee Hawks, New York Knicks) (born 1932)
- August 3 — Ray Patterson, NBA executive (Milwaukee Bucks, Houston Rockets)
- August 4 — Sherman White, college player at Long Island famous for being indicted in point shaving scandal (born 1928)
- August 8 — Mike Barrett, ABA player and Olympic gold medalist in 1968 (born 1943)
- August 18 — Scotty Robertson, NBA and college coach (born 1930)
- August 27 — Bob Hubbard, American NBL and BAA player (born 1922)
- August 31 — Cal Christensen, NBA player (Milwaukee Hawks, Cincinnati Royals) (born 1927)
- August 31 — Jack Stephens, NBA player (St. Louis Hawks) (born 1933)
- September 14 — Lewis Brown, NBA player (Washington Bullets) (born 1955)
- September 16 — Dave Gavitt, American basketball coach (Providence College) and founder of the Big East Conference; member of the Naismith Hall as a contributor (born 1937)
- September 17 — Fedon Matheou, Greek basketball player and coach (born 1924)
- September 21 — Mickey Rottner, American NBL (Sheboygan Red Skins) and BAA (Chicago Stags) player (born 1919)
- September 22 — John H. Dick, starter on first NCAA championship team (1939 Oregon Ducks) (born 1918)
- September 30 — Peter Gent, standout forward/center for Michigan State from 1962 to 1964 and author of North Dallas Forty (born 1942)
- October 3 — Jim Neal, NBA player (Syracuse Nationals) (born 1930)
- October 9 — Antonis Christeas, Greek basketball player (Panellinios, AEK Athens) (born 1937)
- October 9 — Chauncey Hardy, 23-year-old American playing professionally in Romania (born 1988)
- October 12 — Lewis Mills, college coach (Richmond) and athletic director
- November 2 — Ilmar Kullam, Olympic silver medalist for the Soviet Union in 1952 (born 1922)
- November 8 — Ed Macauley, Hall of Fame player (St. Louis Hawks) (born 1928)
- November 9 — Bob Carney, NBA player (Minneapolis Lakers) (born 1932)
- November 17 — Kurt Budke, women's college basketball coach (Oklahoma State) (born 1961)
- November 18 — Walt Hazzard, NBA player and college coach (UCLA) (born 1942)
- November 22 — Alberto Reynoso, Philippine Basketball Association player (born 1940)
- November 25 — Hoddy Mahon, College basketball coach (Seton Hall)
- November 30 — George McCarty, College coach (New Mexico State, UTEP) (born 1915)
- December 1 — Dick Wehr, BAA player (Indianapolis Jets) and college coach (Georgia State) (born 1925)

== See also ==
- Timeline of women's basketball
