= Shonnard =

Shonnard is a surname. Notable people with the surname include:

- David R. Shonnard (fl. 1993), American engineer
- Eugenie Shonnard (1886–1978), American sculptor and painter
