= Karl A. Smith =

- Born: 1947
- Occupations: Metallurgical engineer, academic and author.

Academic background
- Education: BS., Metallurgical Engineering; MS., Metallurgical Engineering; PhD., Educational Psychology
- Alma mater: Michigan Technological University; University of Minnesota
- Website: https://karlsmithmn.org/

Karl A. Smith is an American metallurgical engineer, academic and author. He is an emeritus Cooperative Learning Professor of Engineering Education at Purdue University's School of Engineering Education, as well as an emeritus Professor of Civil, Environmental, and Geo-Engineering, Morse-Alumni Distinguished University Teaching Professor, and Faculty Member at the Technological Leadership Institute at the University of Minnesota.

Smith's work has focused on developing research and innovation capabilities in engineering education, exploring cooperation in learning and design, and managing projects and knowledge. His publications comprise research articles and eight books including Teamwork and Project Management, How to Model it: Problem Solving for the Computer Age and New Paradigms for College Teaching. He is the recipient of the University of Minnesota Distinguished Alumni Award (2006), an Honorary Doctorate from the Universiti Teknologi Malaysia (2014) along with the Chester F. Carlson Award (2001), the Distinguished Service Award (2006), and the Lifetime Achievement Award (2015), all from the American Society for Engineering Education.

Smith is a Fellow of the American Association for the Advancement of Science and the American Society for Engineering Education, where he was inducted into the Hall of Fame in 2023. He served as the Guest Editor of a Special Issue of the Journal of Engineering Education, and as the Editor-in-Chief of Annals of Research on Engineering Education (AREE).

== Education and early career ==
Smith earned a BS in Metallurgical Engineering from Michigan Technological University in 1969, subsequently working at an engineering firm in Moab, Utah. He returned to Michigan Tech to complete an M.S. degree in 1972 and then moved to Minneapolis for a research position at the University of Minnesota.

== Career ==
Smith continued his academic career as an assistant professor at the University of Minnesota in 1980, later becoming associate professor in 1986 and Professor in 2004. In 2011 he served as Distinguished Engineering Education Innovation (E^{2}I) Fellow at the Hong Kong University of Science and Technology. He retired from the University of Minnesota in 2011 and between 2006 and 2022 he served as Cooperative Learning Professor of Engineering Education at Purdue University's School of Engineering Education. Also since 2011, he has held positions as an emeritus Professor of Civil, Environmental, and Geo-Engineering, Morse-Alumni Distinguished University Teaching Professor, and Faculty Member at the Technological Leadership Institute at the University of Minnesota. Additionally, in collaboration with Tony Starfield, Alan Wassyng, Sam Sharp, and others, he developed the civil engineering systems and "How to model it" courses for upper division and first-year students, respectively, which, alongside his work in cooperative learning and teamwork with David W. and Roger T. Johnson, led to the creation of the Civil Engineering Project Management course and the Management of Technology Project and Knowledge Management course.

Between 1999 and 2004, he had a split appointment with Michigan State University where he served as a Senior Consultant to the Provost for Faculty Development. At the University of Minnesota, he was the Co-coordinator of the Bush Faculty Development Program for Excellence and Diversity in Teaching from 1996 to 1997, Director of undergraduate studies in the Department of Civil Engineering from 1999 to 2004, and executive co-director and researcher in the STEM Education Research Center from 2012 to 2018. He was inducted into the Michigan Technological University Academy for Engineering Education Leadership in 2018.

== Research ==
Smith has focused his research on mineral processing technology along with engineering education by facilitating faculty and graduate student professional growth, exploring the role of cooperation in learning and design, addressing problem formulation, modeling, and knowledge engineering, and managing projects and knowledge.

=== Engineering education ===
Smith's contributions to engineering education encompass work in cooperative learning and knowledge engineering applications. He published a paper in the Journal of Engineering Education, in 1981, introducing cooperative learning in engineering literature. During the early 1980s, he conducted some of the first randomized design empirical studies on cooperative learning in engineering classes. Subsequently, in the late 1980s, he transitioned from engineering research to education research, particularly focusing on cooperative learning and structured controversy, as his emphasis shifted towards teaching and research on project and knowledge management. This research addressed the critical needs of enhancing student learning, deepening understanding, and fostering collaborative skills. Beyond cooperative learning, his work included structured academic controversy, aimed at facilitating comprehensive understanding of complex issues through argument development and cooperative learning strategies.

Smith published books on this topic, including Active Learning: Cooperation in the College Classroom with David W. Johnson and Roger T. Johnson, providing strategies for college faculty to implement cooperative learning. They also co-authored Cooperative learning: Increasing College Faculty Instructional Productivity, in which they delved into the basics of cooperative learning, and he discussed how cooperative learning changed college teaching in New Paradigms for College Teaching that he co-edited with William E. Campbell. Later, in 2000, he wrote Teamwork and Project Management, where he emphasized key skills for engineering success, including teamwork, problem-solving, and project management.

=== Mineral processing technology ===
Smith worked on the development of technically and environmentally sound mineral and waste processing technologies. He laid the groundwork for various technical innovations, including a carbochlorination technique proposed for use in the processing of lunar anorthite. Alongside colleagues, he confirmed graphite's ability, with or without catalysts, to selectively reduce iron oxide in synthetic ilmenite, observed through isothermal weight loss over time from 850 °C to 1200 °C under argon atmosphere. Additionally, he explored reduction roasting processes using various reductants and desulfurizers to convert sulfide minerals to metallic form without sulfur dioxide emissions, capturing sulfur as either calcium sulfide or sodium sulfide.

== Awards and honors ==
- 2001 – Chester F. Carlson Award, American Society for Engineering Education
- 2006 – Distinguished Alumni Award, University of Minnesota
- 2006 – Distinguished Service Award, American Society for Engineering Education
- 2014 – Honorary Doctorate, University of Technology Malaysia
- 2015 – Lifetime Achievement Award, American Society for Engineering Education
- 2023 – Hall of Fame, American Society for Engineering Education

== Bibliography ==
=== Selected books ===
- How to model it: Problem Solving for the Computer Age (1990) ISBN 978-0-8087-7970-4
- Active Learning: Cooperation in the College Classroom (1991) ISBN 978-0-939603-14-5
- Cooperative learning: Increasing college faculty instructional productivity (1991) ISBN 978-1878380095
- New paradigms for College Teaching (1997) ISBN 978-0-939603-26-8
- Teamwork and Project Management, 4th edition, (2014) ISBN 978-0-07-353490-9

=== Selected articles ===
- Johnson, D. W., Johnson, R. T., & Smith, K. A. (1998). Cooperative learning returns to college what evidence is there that it works?. Change: the magazine of higher learning, 30(4), 26–35.
- Smith, K.A. (2000). Going deeper: Formal small-group learning in large classes. In MacGregor, J., Cooper, J., Smith, K, and Robinson, P., eds. Strategies for Energizing Large Classes: From Small Groups to Learning Communities. New Directions for Teaching and Learning, 81, 25–46. San Francisco: Jossey-Bass.
- Johnson, D.W., Johnson, R.T., and Smith, K.A. (2000). Constructive controversy: The power of intellectual conflict. Change, 32 (1), 28–37.
- Wankat, P. C., Felder, R. M., Smith, K. A., & Oreovicz, F. S. (2002). The scholarship of teaching and learning in engineering. In M.T. Huber & S.P. Morreale, eds., Disciplinary styles in the scholarship of teaching and learning, 217–237.
- Smith, K. A., Sheppard, S. D., Johnson, D. W., & Johnson, R. T. (2005). Pedagogies of engagement: Classroom‐based practices. Journal of Engineering Education, 94(1), 87–101.
- Johnson, D. W., Johnson, R. T., & Smith, K. (2007). The state of cooperative learning in postsecondary and professional settings. Educational psychology review, 19, 15–29.
- Froyd, J. E., Wankat, P. C., & Smith, K. A. (2012). Five major shifts in 100 years of engineering education. Proceedings of the IEEE, 100(Special Centennial Issue), 1344–1360.
- Singer, S. & Smith, K.A. (2013). Discipline-Based Education Research: Understanding and Improving Learning in Undergraduate Science and Engineering. Guest Editorial. Journal of Engineering Education, 102, 468–471.
- Lichtenstein, G., Chen, H.L., Smith, K.A. & Maldonado, T.A. (2013). Retention and Persistence of Women and Minorities Along the Engineering Pathway in the United States. In A. Johri & B. Olds (Eds), Cambridge Handbook on Engineering Education Research.
- Johnson, D. W., Johnson, R. T., & Smith, K. A. (2014). Cooperative learning: Improving university instruction by basing practice on validated theory. Journal on Excellence in University Teaching, 25(4), 1-26.
- Streveler, R.A. & Smith, K.A. (2020). Opinion: Course Design in the Time of Coronavirus: Put on your Designer's CAP. Advances in Engineering Education, COVID-19 Issue.
- Smith, K.A. & Starfield, A.M. (2023). Reflections on modeling and teaching modeling. The Journal of Undergraduate Mathematics and Its Applications (UMAP), 44(2).
- Smith, K.A. & Felder, R.M. (2023). Cooperative Learning in Engineering Education: The Story of an Ongoing Uphill Climb. In Robyn Gillies, Barbara Millis, and Neil Davidson, eds. Contemporary Global Perspectives on Cooperative Learning. New York: Routledge.
