= Michigan Technological University =

Public university in Houghton, Michigan, U.S.

- Former names: Michigan Mining School (1885–1897); Michigan College of Mines (1897–1927); Michigan College of Mining and Technology (1927–1964)
- Motto: Tomorrow Needs Michigan Tech
- Type: Public research university
- Established: 1885; 141 years ago
- Academic affiliations: ORAU; space-grant
- Endowment: $184.15 million (2025)
- President: Richard J. Koubek
- Provost: Andrew Storer
- Faculty: 495
- Administrative staff: 1,205
- Students: 7,429
- Undergraduates: 6,022
- Postgraduates: 1,407
- Location: Houghton, Michigan, United States; 47.12°N 88.55°W
- Campus: 925 acres (3.74 km^{2}), Rural
- Colors: Metallic silver and gold
- Nickname: Huskies
- Sporting affiliations: NCAA; Division II – GLIAC; Division I – CCHA
- Mascot: Blizzard T. Husky
- Website: mtu.edu
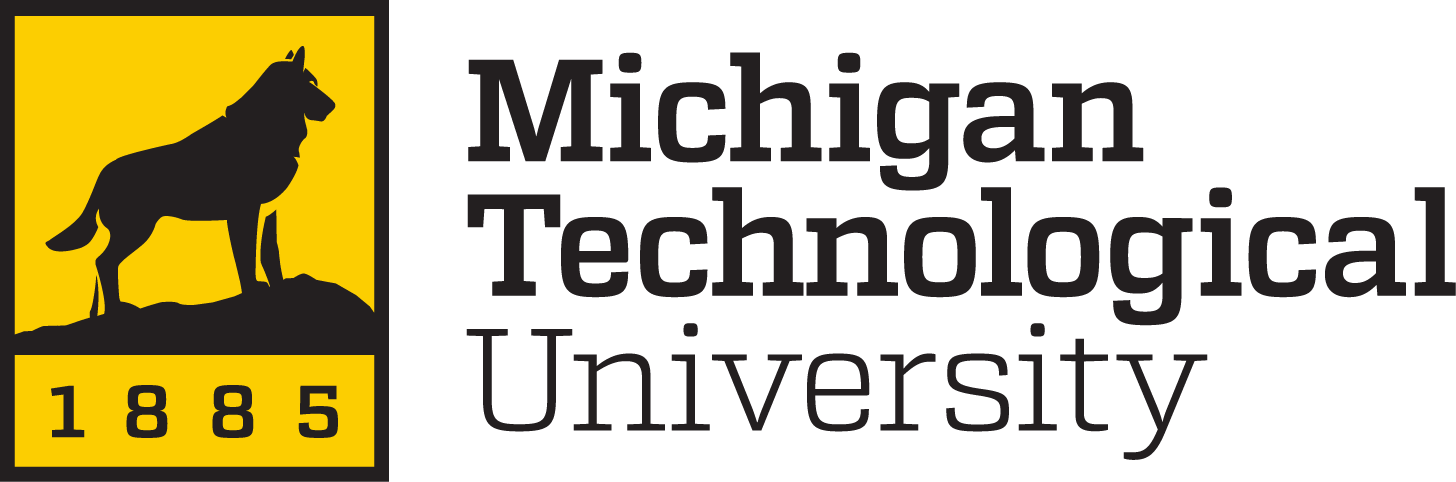

- Location within Michigan

Michigan Technological University (Michigan Tech, MTU, or simply Tech) is a public research university in Houghton, Michigan, United States. It was founded in 1885 as the Michigan Mining School, the first post-secondary institution in the Upper Peninsula of Michigan.

The university comprises five colleges and schools: the College of Engineering, the College of Computing, the College of Sciences and Arts, the College of Business, and the College of Forest Resources and Environmental Science. They offer more than 140 degree programs to nearly 7,000 graduate and undergraduate students. Its main campus sits on 925 acres (374 ha) on a bluff overlooking Portage Lake. The campus consists of 36 buildings, the first of which was built in 1908.

Michigan Tech's athletic teams are nicknamed the Huskies and compete primarily in the NCAA Division II Great Lakes Intercollegiate Athletic Conference (GLIAC). The men's hockey team competes in Division I as a member of the Central Collegiate Hockey Association (CCHA), and has won three national championships. The women's basketball team was national runner-up in 2011.

Michigan Tech is classified as a "Research 1" institution by the Carnegie Classification, the highest classification for research activity.

== History ==
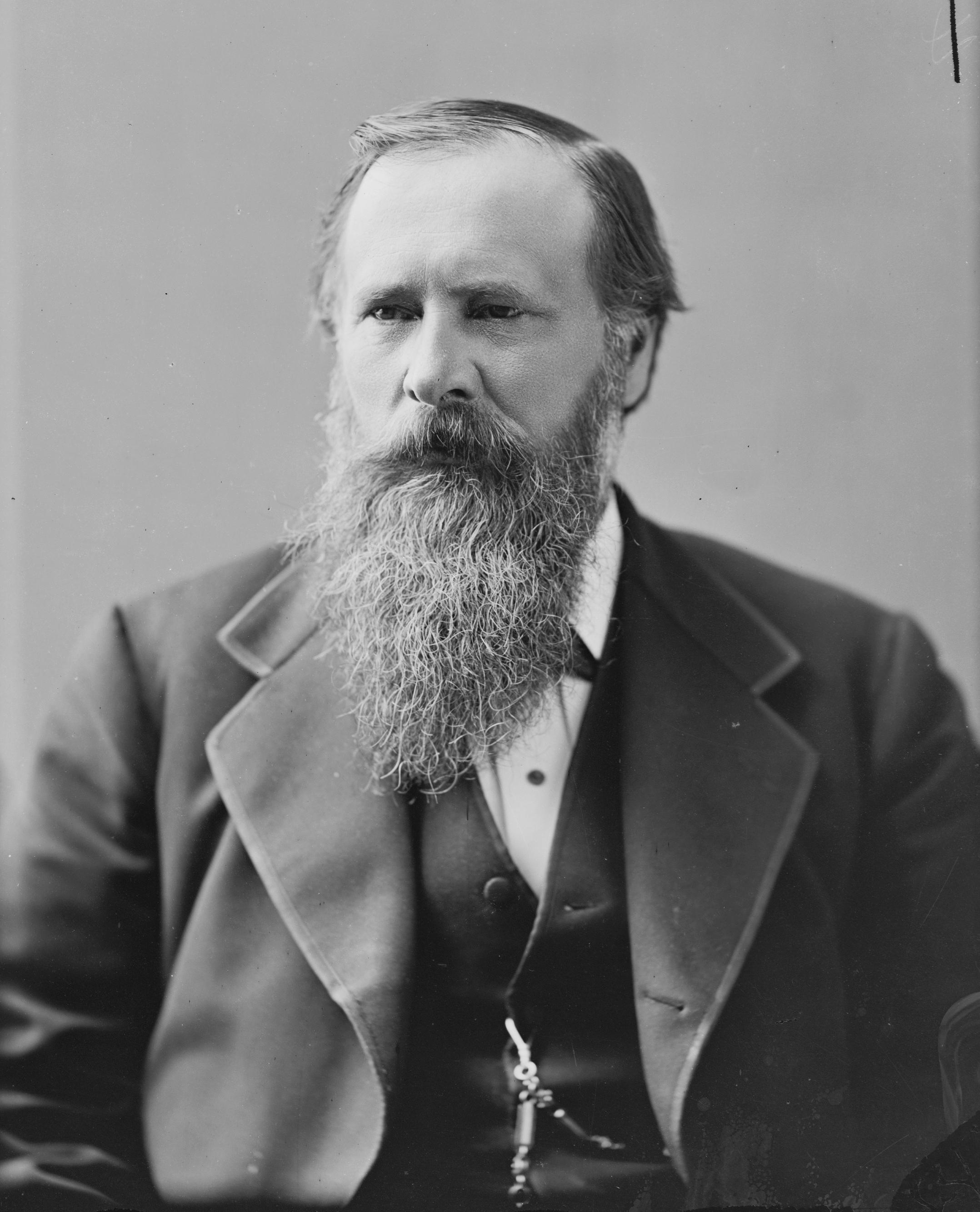
Jay Abel Hubbell, father of Michigan Tech

Michigan Tech was founded in 1885 as the Michigan Mining School. After much agitation by Jay Abel Hubbell, the state legislature established the school to train mining engineers. Hubbell donated land for the school's first buildings.

The school started with four faculty members and twenty-three students. It was housed in the Houghton Fire Hall from 1886 through 1889.

MTU's first president was Marshman E. Wadsworth (1887–1898). Enrollment grew to such a point that its name no longer reflected its purpose. The name was then changed to the Michigan College of Mines in 1897. This name lasted through World War I until 1925, but by this time the school had begun offering a wider variety of degrees and once again decided to change its name to the Michigan College of Mining and Technology in 1927.

Fred W. McNair (1899–1924) was the college's second president. By 1931, enrollment had reached nearly 600.

Under President Grover C. Dillman (1935–1956), the school underwent many notable changes, including the construction of the Memorial Union Building, the purchasing of an ice rink and a golf course as well as the procurement of the village of Alberta, Michigan.

In 1956, J. Robert Van Pelt became the new president of the university. He restarted many PhD programs and created a focus on research. This included the school's first analog computation class in 1956–57.

In 1964, one of the final years of his presidency, the school changed from a college to a university, changing its name a final time to Michigan Technological University. The change from the Michigan College of Mining and Technology was necessary for two reasons, according to Van Pelt. First, the college had expanded too greatly and the current name was no longer an accurate title. Also, including "mining" in the name of the college was misleading. The name "Michigan Technological University" was chosen in order to retain the nickname "Michigan Tech" that had already been in use since 1927. Along with its new name, the school also gained new constitutional status in 1964. This gave responsibility for control of the university to its Board of Control rather than the state legislature.

The university has historically been focused on engineering, and as of November 2022, 57% of students are enrolled in the College of Engineering. Michigan Tech offers a broad range of programs beyond engineering, with 149 undergraduate programs and 103 graduate programs offered.

=== Women at Michigan Tech ===
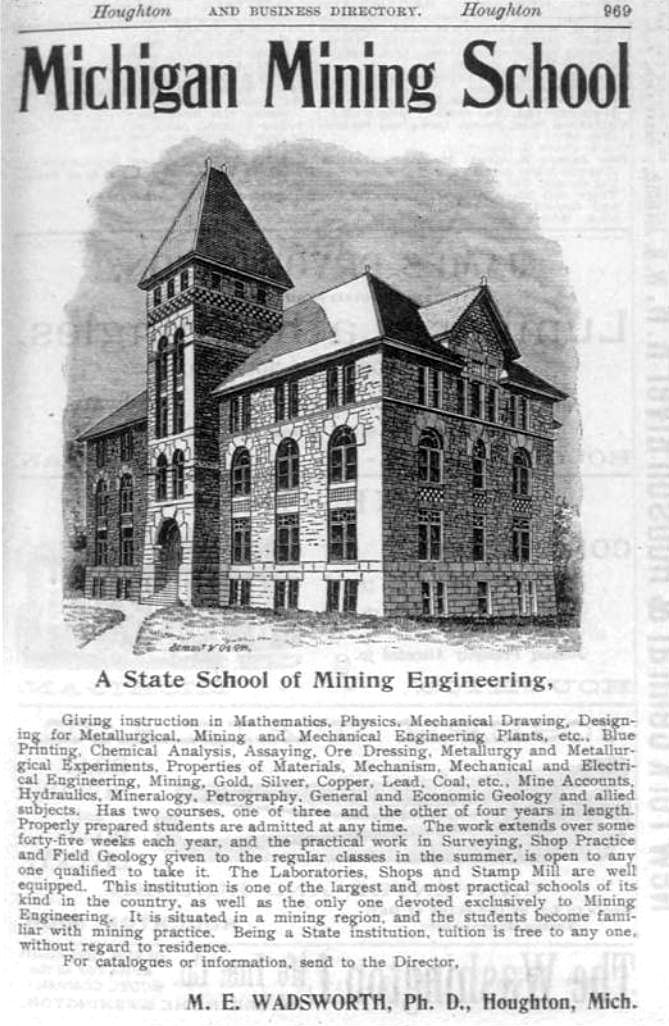
1895 advertisement for the Michigan Mining School

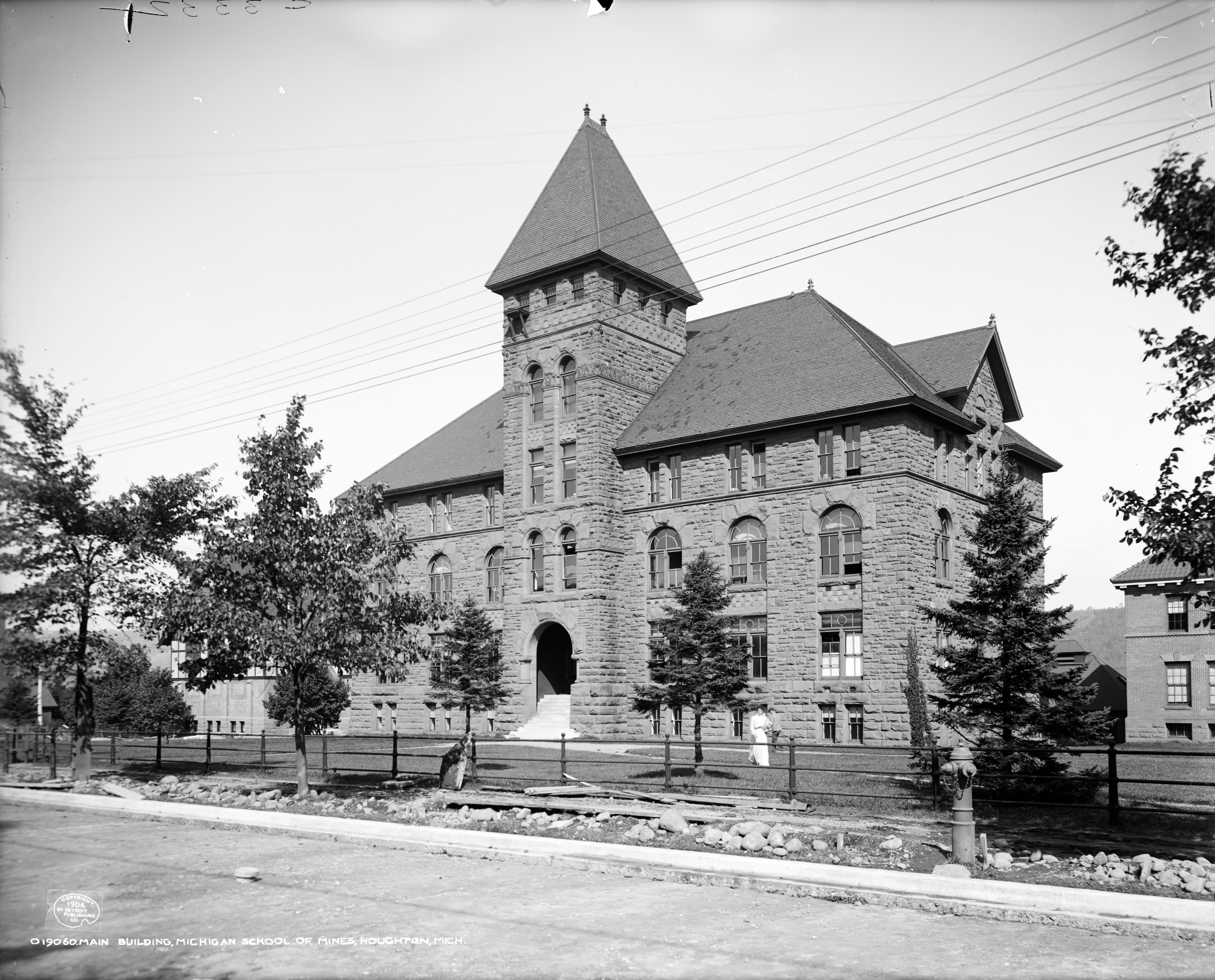
Main building, ca. 1906

Women began to attend classes at the Michigan College of Mines around 1890. The early female students were mostly daughters of professors or wealthy businessmen of the Houghton and Hancock area. They were allowed to take classes and were given special student status, which meant that they could be enrolled in courses, but were not able to receive a degree.

The first woman to receive a degree from the Michigan College of Mines was Margaret R. Holley, who was born in Lake Linden and who had received a liberal arts degree at a different university outside of the Upper Peninsula. She then moved back to Houghton to work on a chemistry degree, which she received in 1933. Two years later, she also received a master's degree in chemistry from the Michigan College of Mines.

The first female faculty member of the Michigan College of Mines was Ella Wood, who was hired as an assistant professor for the Humanities department in 1927. She was made an associate professor by 1928, a full professor by 1935, and the head of geography and languages by 1937. Wood was hired by the university five years before women were allowed to pursue degrees. She also worked in the library and taught meteorology to assist with pilot training sessions to students during WWII. Her presence encouraged many young women to apply for special student status and take classes at the school and ultimately allowed women to receive degrees at this school. As co-ed enrollment increased, she promoted women involvement on campus and co-educational programs. She also became the academic advisor to all female students and thoroughly enjoyed the role of "mother" that she was able to play here to all of her students. Wood also held the title "Dean of Women", making her the first woman to receive the title dean at the university.

Margaret Holley Chapman was the first woman to complete a degree program from Michigan College of Mining and Technology, which would become Michigan Technological University in 1964. She earned a Bachelor of Science in General Science in 1933, and another in chemistry the following year. Margaret went on to become a candidate for a master's degree in General Science. Not only was she the first woman to receive a degree from Michigan Tech, she was also the first female trustee, and requested that a scholarship be established to help other female students to finance their education. The Margaret H. Chapman Endowed Scholarship is still active to this day.

The first woman to graduate with a degree in Chemical Engineering was Alice Runge in 1942. Following shortly behind was the first woman to graduate with High Honors in Metallurgical & Materials Engineering, Lilian (Heikkinen) Beck, in 1947. She was also the first woman from Michigan Tech to be inducted into the Alpha Sigma Mu honorary fraternity of the International Metallurgical Society. One year later, Marian Ione (Smith) Scott was the first woman to earn a Bachelor of Science in Mechanical Engineering.

==== Women in athletics ====
The first female varsity athlete was Nada J. Fenton, who was a member of the rifle team during the 1950s. She was a graduate of Houghton High school and entered MTU in 1952. Nada holds the record of being the first woman to ever fire on a varsity rifle team in the world.

Today Michigan Tech has seven women's varsity sports including basketball, cross country, Nordic skiing, tennis, track and field, volleyball, and soccer.

==== Today ====
As of the fall semester in 2021, the total enrollment at Michigan Technological University is 6,977. Of those students, 2,054 of them were women (an all-time high), which means female students make up about 29% of the enrollment at Michigan Tech.

== Campus ==
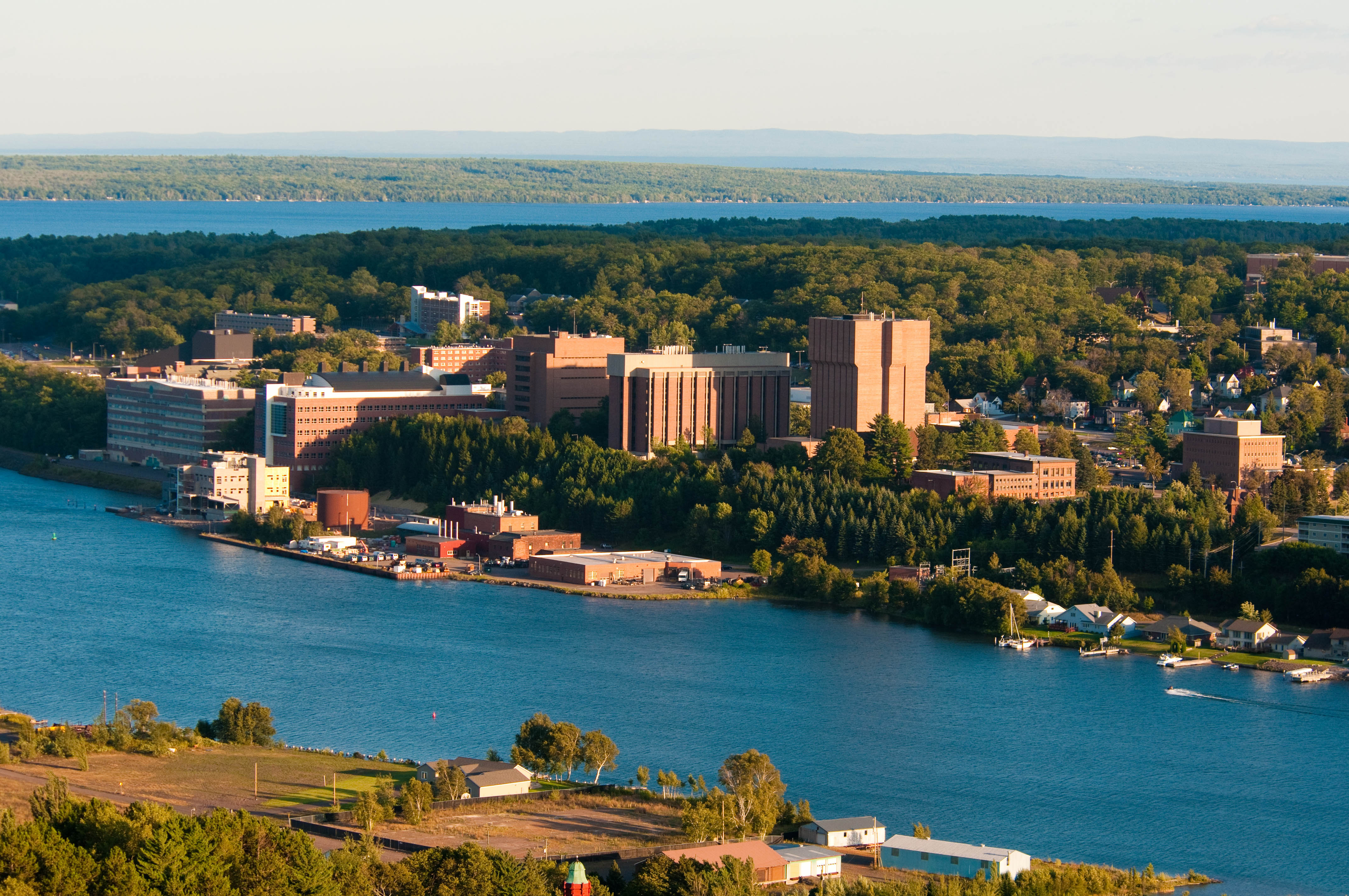
Michigan Tech's campus

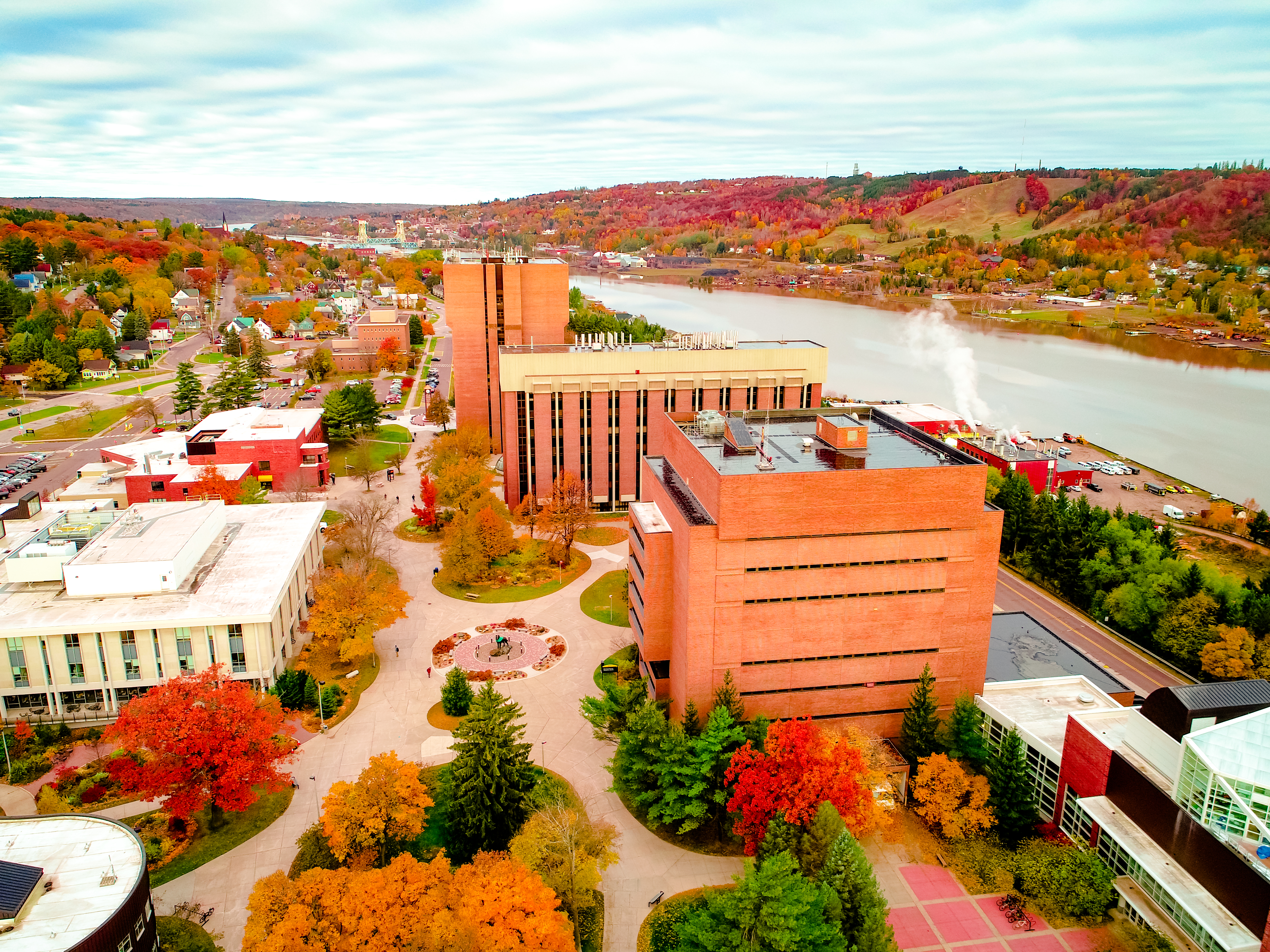
The main Michigan Tech campus is located in Houghton, Michigan—north of US 41 and south of the Portage Canal.

The main Michigan Tech campus is mainly situated on US-41 in Houghton. The main part of campus can be traversed in about 10 minutes. The Lakeshore Center in downtown Houghton houses the offices of Human Relations, Vice President for Research, and other departments. Faculty are involved in several distance education programs with clients including General Motors.

The Portage Lake Golf Course opened for play in April 1902. In 1945, the members could no longer support the needs of the course and sold it to Michigan Tech for one dollar. Since then, many improvements have been made such as the addition of another nine holes in 1969. In 1984, the new clubhouse was constructed. In 1996, a sprinkler system was installed to modernize the course and keep it playable. The Portage Lake Golf Course is located two miles (3 km) southeast of campus. With 18 holes on 160 acres, it offers two nines of distinctly different flavors and challenges.

Mont Ripley is the oldest ski area in Michigan (established in the 1900s) in the snowiest city in the Midwest. It is also university-owned, so Michigan Tech students ski or snowboard for free. Mont Ripley has twenty-two trails, a terrain park, a tubing park, sits on 112 acres, and has a scenic overlook of the Keweenaw Waterway. It is about two miles from campus; the hill is viewable from most campus buildings. In 2019, Michigan Tech's Mont Ripley earned the university a No. 13 rating on College Census' 25 Best Colleges for Skiing and Snowboarding list.

The Michigan Tech Trails, commonly referred to as Tech Trails, is a year-round trail system owned by Michigan Tech. It originally started as a simple path through the woods until 2001, when Michigan Tech implemented a plan to develop the trails as a way to secure funding for the Michigan Tech Varsity Nordic skiing program and to create facility to attract outdoor-loving students. The Michigan Tech College of Forest Resources and Environmental Science proposed that revenue could be generated from timber harvesting to support the team and upgrade the trails. The university's cross country ski trail system is located near the Student Development Complex in the Michigan Tech Recreational Forest. It includes 33 km of groomed cross country ski trails (both classic and skate sections) and 11.7 km of groomed snowshoe/bike trails. 7.5 km of the trail is lighted. The Tech Trails are nationally recognized for the quality of skiing, consistency of grooming and variety of terrain. The trail system, with the help of hundreds of volunteers, hosted the US Junior National Championships, U.S. Senior National championships, and the 2023 US Cross Country Ski Championships along with regional races. With Houghton's average snowfall of 218 inches, the season usually opens in early December and continues into April. Students ski free; community members can purchase a pass.

The Ford Center is a historical village that once owned and operated as a sawmill by Henry Ford, located 40 miles south of Michigan Tech's main campus in Alberta. The Ford Motor Company donated the Ford Center to Michigan Tech in the 1950s. Since 1954, the Ford Center has been an outdoor and environmental education center utilized by Michigan Tech students enrolled in forestry, ecology, wildlife ecology, and natural resource management. Referred to as "Fall Camp" by the students, this center boasts 4,906 acres of forest and wetlands where the students attend outdoor classes. The center also contains several buildings that the students use for their dormitory, recreation and indoor classes. The Ford Motor Company gave Michigan Tech a grant in 1996 to turn the sawmill into a museum. The museum is open to the public as well as the center itself for holding conferences and reunions.

== Academics ==
=== Undergraduate admissions ===
Undergraduate admissions statistics
- 2021 entering class
- Admit rate: 85.7 (▲ +9.3)
- Yield rate: 21.5 (▼ −10.8)

Test scores middle 50%
- SAT Total: 1138–1320 (among 70% of FTFs)
- ACT Composite: 25–31 (among 28% of FTFs)

Undergraduate admission to Michigan Tech is considered "selective" by U.S. News & World Report. For the Class of 2025 (enrolling Fall 2021), Michigan Tech received 8,041 applications and accepted 6,895 (85.7%), with 1,479 enrolling. The middle 50% range of SAT scores for enrolling freshmen was 1138–1320. The middle 50% ACT composite score range was 25–31. The average overall ACT scores for incoming students is 27.2 in fall 2017, compared to 21.2 nationally.

Fall first-time freshman statistics
	2021	2020	2019	2018	2017	2016
Applicants	8,041	7,476	5,978	5,838	5,469	5,589
Admits	6,895	5,260	4,442	4,313	4,074	4,272
Admit rate	85.7	70.4	74.3	73.9	74.5	76.4
Enrolled	1,479	1,201	1,301	1,245	1,323	1,381
Yield rate	21.5	22.8	29.3	28.9	32.5	32.3
ACT composite* (out of 36)	25–31 (28%^{†})	25–30 (38%^{†})	25–30 (41%^{†})	24–30 (43%^{†})	25–30 (57%^{†})	25–30 (97%^{†})
SAT composite* (out of 1600)	1138–1320 (70%^{†})	1160–1340 (81%^{†})	1170–1360 (81%^{†})	1170–1360 (78%^{†})	1160–1340 (69%^{†})	—
* middle 50% range^{†} percentage of first-time freshmen who chose to submit

=== Divisions ===
Michigan Tech offers more than 120 undergraduate and graduate degrees in engineering, natural and physical sciences, computing, business and economics, technology, environmental studies, arts, humanities, and social sciences. Home to the first college of computing in the state of Michigan, the university is divided into five colleges: Business; Computing; Engineering; Forest Resources and Environmental Science; and Sciences and Arts.

- The College of Engineering. A total of 17 undergraduate degrees are offered by the college, ranging from the original mining engineering degree to robotics engineering, added in 2019. The undergraduate degree programs, together with masters and doctoral degrees are offered across the college's nine departments: biomedical engineering; civil, environmental, and geospatial engineering; chemical engineering; electrical and computer engineering; geological and mining engineering and sciences; manufacturing and mechanical engineering technology; materials science and engineering; and mechanical engineering-engineering mechanics.
- The College of Computing was established in 2019. It offers undergraduate degrees in computer science, software engineering, computer network & system administration, cybersecurity, electrical engineering technology. Graduate degrees are offered in computer science, mechatronics, health informatics, and cybersecurity.
- The College of Sciences and Arts has majors in fields including bio-informatics, biological sciences, biochemistry, cheminformatics, chemistry, communication, culture and media, English, kinesiology and integrative physiology, mathematics, nursing, pharmaceutical chemistry, physics, psychology, scientific and technical communication, and social sciences. The college is also home to the visual and performing arts, Air Force ROTC, and Army ROTC programs.
- The College of Business is accredited by AACSB. Students can receive a Bachelor of Science degree in seven areas, including accounting, economics, finance, management, management information systems, marketing, and operations and systems management. The undergraduate program includes a unique Business Development Experience, where students gain real-life business experience in a mentored environment. Students also have the opportunity to join several business student organizations, including the Applied Portfolio Management Program where they invest $1 million in the stock market each year.
- The College of Forest Resources and Environmental Science maintains greenhouses, labs, and the 4,000-acre (16 km^{2}) Ford Forest and Ford Center in nearby Alberta, and celebrated its 75th year in 2011.

Michigan Tech's Enterprise Program provides students with real-world design, engineering, and entrepreneurial experiences. Enterprises develop engineering skills by allowing students to work in businesslike environments on real-world projects while completing their education. Enterprises include Open Source Technologies, Nanotechnology Innovations, Hybrid Transportation, Aerospace, Blue Marble Security, Husky Game Development, Boardsports Technologies, and Wireless Communications Enterprises.

Its three most popular undergraduate majors, by 2021–22 graduates, were Mechanical Engineering (266), Electrical Engineering (93), and Chemical Engineering (88).

=== Rankings ===
Academic rankings

National
- Forbes: 224
- U.S. News & World Report: 151
- Washington Monthly: 90

Global
- QS: 901-950

In 2024, the Foundation for Individual Rights in Education (FIRE) ranked over 248 schools and surveyed a total of 55,102 students, with Michigan Technological University achieving the top ranking for academic freedom and viewpoint tolerance.

In 2024, Washington Monthly ranked Michigan Tech 90th among 438 national universities in the U.S. based on Michigan Tech's contribution to the public good, as measured by social mobility, research, and promoting public service.

=== Research ===
Michigan Tech ranked 172nd of 600 US colleges and universities in research and development expenditures in 2007. Research expenditures exceeded $81 million in the 2021–22 school year. The university has 16 research centers and institutes and 271,962 square feet of research space and labs.

There are 12 research areas including Space Sciences, Electronics, Ecosystems, Energy, Health, Ocean Sciences, and Robotics. There are 18 research centers on and off campus including the Michigan Tech Research Institute.

== Student body ==
In the 2023–2024 academic year, 68% of Michigan Technological University students were from the state of Michigan, 22% were from other states in the US, and 10% were from other countries. The first to second year retention rate for first-time students was 84.5% and the six-year graduation rate was 72.2%. The student to faculty ratio was 13:1. In the fall of 2021, the university enrolled its largest freshman class since 1982.

The student body consisted of 7,324 students, including 1,421 graduate students and 473 faculty members. In 2017, Michigan Tech students were primarily from Michigan, Wisconsin, Minnesota, and Illinois.

Student body composition as of May 2, 2022
Race and ethnicity	Total
White	85%
Other (Note: Other consists of multiracial Americans & those who prefer to not say.)	4%
Hispanic	3%
Asian	2%
Black	1%
Foreign national	1%
Economic diversity
Low-income (Note: The percentage of students who received an income-based federal Pell grant intended for low-income students.)	19%
Affluent (Note: The percentage of students who are a part of the American middle class at the bare minimum.)	81%

== Organization and administration ==
The university is governed by an eight-member board of trustees whose members are appointed by the governor of Michigan and confirmed by the Michigan Senate.

=== Student organizations ===
Michigan Tech currently recognizes more than two hundred student organizations.

=== Greek life ===
Michigan Tech is currently host to twelve fraternities and seven sororities on campus.

=== Athletics ===
As the school mascot is the husky (specifically, Blizzard T. Husky), the school's sports teams are known as the Huskies. Michigan Tech competes primarily in the NCAA's Division II Great Lakes Intercollegiate Athletic Conference (GLIAC), while the men's hockey team competes in Division I as a member of the Central Collegiate Hockey Association (CCHA). Michigan Tech owns a downhill skiing/snowboarding hill, Mont Ripley, just across Portage Lake from campus, and maintains extensive cross-country skiing trails (used for mountain biking in summer).

==== School songs ====
Michigan Tech has both an official fight song and an official Alma Mater. At most sporting events, however, both the "Engineer's Song" and "In Heaven There Is No Beer" are played by the Huskies Pep Band.

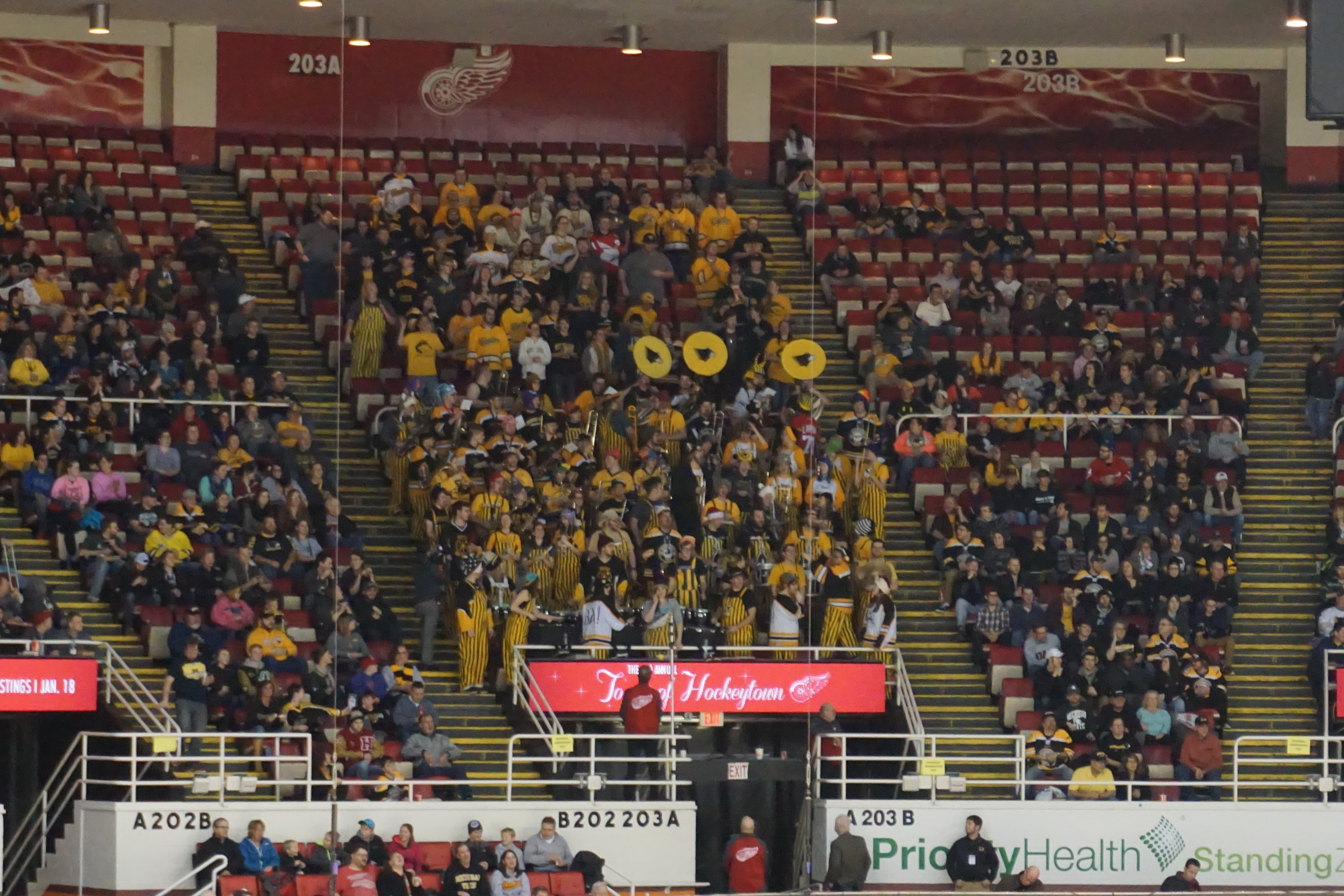
Michigan Tech Huskies Pep Band at the 2015 Great Lakes Invitational

=== Huskies Pep Band ===
The Huskies Pep Band is the university's scramble band. The Huskies Pep Band performs at all home football, basketball, volleyball, and ice hockey games, as well as parades and other local events. The band is often recognized as one of the best bands in NCAA Division 1 hockey because of their sheer power and energy, and their firm roots in tradition. The band was formed in the fall of 1928 as the Michigan Tech ROTC Band, under the baton of E. E. Melville.

They are known for performing traditional songs such as "In Heaven There Is No Beer" and "The Engineers" along with a variety of selections in popular music. Some cheers and songs have been around since the 1930s and '40s, such as the "Blue Skirt Waltz" in which the pep band (along with the audience) would link arms and sway back and forth. This tradition began during Winter Carnival in 1948 after Frankie Yankovic had recently performed there and has been since dubbed "The Copper Country Anthem." Some of the antics of the band are considered Monty Python-esque, often performing songs from the sketches themselves and shouting the phrase "Run away!" when they exit from the performance. The band also incorporates other non-traditional ensemble instruments, including electric bass guitar, bagpipes, kazoos, cowbells, accordions, an electric viola, a toaster, an oven, and at one point a large inflatable lobster.

=== Traditions ===
- K-Day (Keweenaw Day) is the first Friday of the fall term. It's a university-sponsored, half-day holiday hosted by Greek Life. Activities include a student organizations fair, games, swimming, and music. Originally K-Day was held at Fort Wilkins at Copper Harbor. From 1976 to 2017, this fair was held at Mclain State Park. This halted after severe weather damage in June 2018. "K-Day" has been held at Chassell Centennial Park in Chassell, MI since then with the exception of 2020 because of COVID.
- Homecoming has happened on campus each fall since 1929. The event is marked by a football game and a cardboard boat race in the local canal.
- Parade of Nations and multicultural festival began in 1990 as a way to acknowledge and celebrate the cultures and countries of Keweenaw residents and visitors, many of whom were Michigan Tech international students. The event occurs in September.
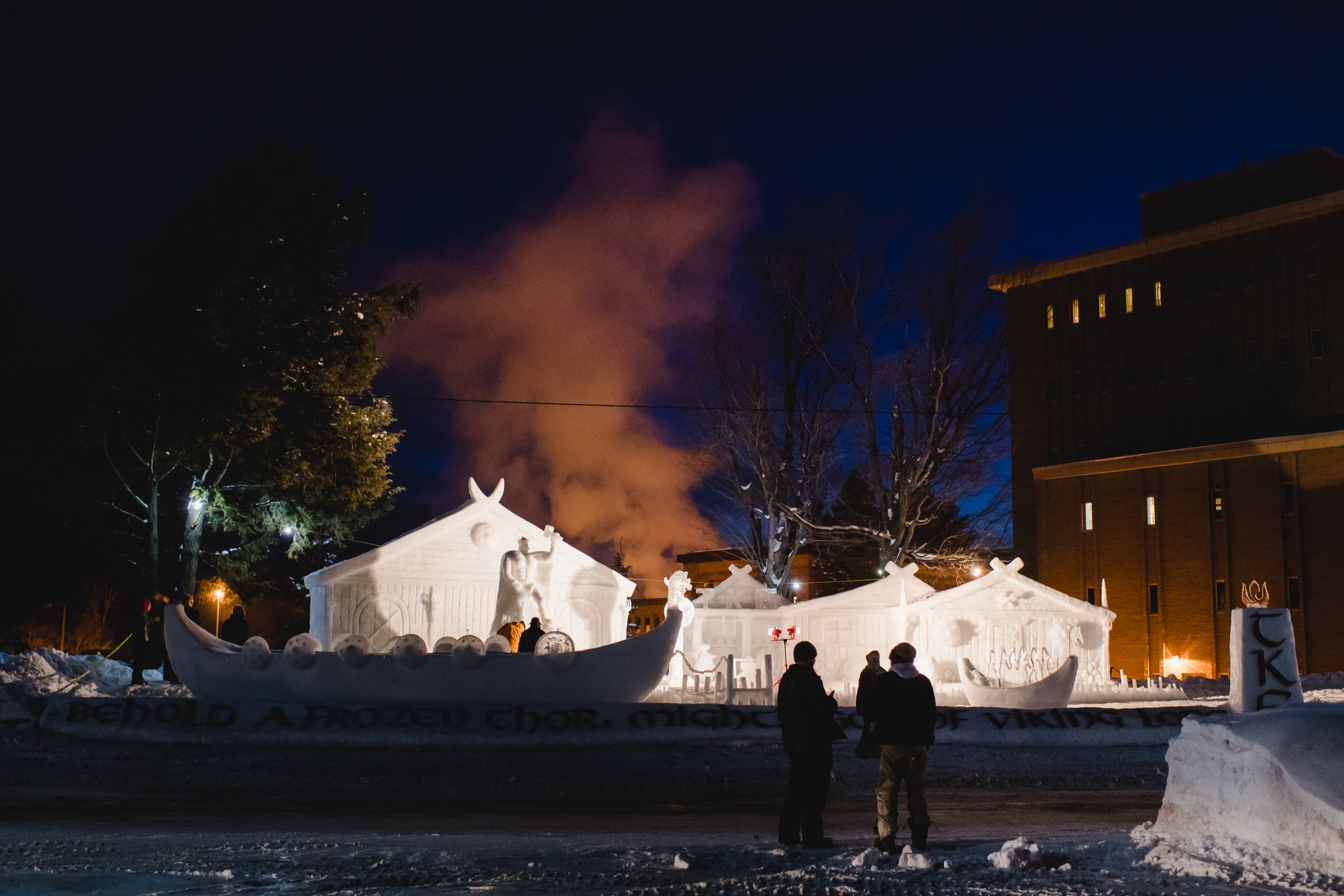
  Snow statue at the 2018 Winter Carnival
- Winter Carnival is where students compete in a variety of artistic and athletic events. The highlight of Winter Carnival is a snow statue competition in which students construct snow and ice sculptures consistent with an annual theme. Winter Carnival began in 1922.
- Spring Fling is always the Friday of Week 13 of the spring semester. Students end the academic year and welcome warmer weather by engaging in activities. Various student organizations participate in this event providing food and entertainment for a campus community eager to relax and have fun before the serious busyness of final exams begins.
- Summer Youth Programs (SYP) have been held on campus since 1972: Women in Engineering (WIE), Engineering Scholars Program (ESP), and National Summer Transportation Institute (NSTI), among many other programs, introduce middle and high school students to college opportunities.
- Film and music festivals at Michigan Tech's Rozsa Center for the Performing Arts occur throughout the year. The Rozsa is a main venue for the Pine Mountain Music Festival; The Red Jacket Jamboree, an old-time radio variety show; and the 41 N Film Festival.

=== Records ===
Michigan Tech holds a world record, the largest snowball (21' 3" circumference), which they accomplished in 2006, as verified by Guinness World Records officials.

They originally held three world records, the third of which was the largest snowball fight (3,745) and most people making snow angels simultaneously in a single venue (3,784). This latter was taken from the city of Bismarck, North Dakota, but about a year later, Bismarck took the record back with 8,962 snow angels.

In 2018, students and community members unofficially broke the world record for most snowmen in one hour (2,228).

== Notable people ==
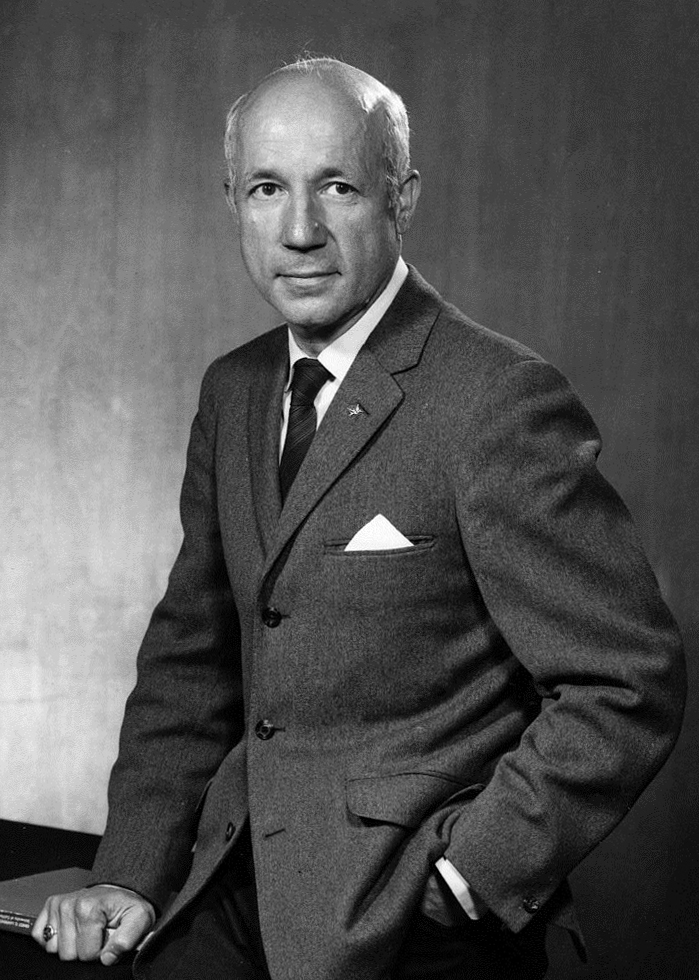
Nobel laureate Melvin Calvin earned his Bachelor of Science from the Michigan College of Mining and Technology in 1931.

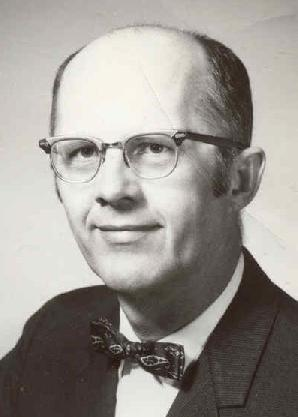
Computer scientist Donald Shell

=== Faculty ===
As of 2025, Michigan Tech has 495 faculty. Notable faculty include Elias C. Aifantis, Stephen Bowen, Margaret Burnett, Robert Schneider, Kathy Halvorsen, Lyon Bradley King, Nancy Langston, Robert J. Nemiroff, Joseph Rallo, Donald Shell, Martha E. Sloan, David R. Shonnard, and Svitlana Winnikow.

=== Alumni ===
There are over 79,000 Michigan Tech alumni living in all 50 states and over 100 countries. Some notable alumni include:

- Joe Berger, former NFL player
- Herb Boxer, first U.S.-born player drafted to the NHL
- Markus J. Buehler, material scientist and McAfee Professorship of Engineering chair at Massachusetts Institute of Technology
- Melvin Calvin, Nobel laureate and discoverer of the Calvin Cycle
- Chris Conner, NHL player
- Jill Dickman, Republican member of the Nevada Assembly
- David Edwards, biomedical engineering professor at Harvard, writer
- Tony Esposito, NHL Hall of Famer
- Roxane Gay, writer, professor, editor, blogger, and commentator
- William S. Hammack, chemical engineer and engineering educator
- David Hill, former chief engineer for the Chevrolet Corvette
- David House, Intel GM of Microcomputer Components Div for 13 years, coined the phrase "Intel Inside"
- Deedra Irwin, biathlete and Beijing 2022 Olympian
- Greg Ives, NASCAR crew chief
- Samson Jenekhe, chemical engineer, chemist, and educator
- Jujhar Khaira, Punjabi professional hockey player
- Martin Lagina, engineer and reality TV personality
- Bob Lurtsema, former NFL player
- Randy McKay, former NHL player, two-time Stanley Cup winner
- David O'Donahue, Wisconsin National Guard general
- Joseph P. Overton, conceiver of the Overton window
- Baijayant Panda, member of lower house of Indian Parliament
- Davis Payne, former head coach of the St. Louis Blues
- Mel Pearson, college ice hockey coach
- Sarah Rajala, electrical engineer and engineering educator
- Bhakta B. Rath, material physicist and Padma Bhushan recipient
- Robert I. Rees, US Army brigadier general
- Kanwal Rekhi, businessman and entrepreneurship promoter in Silicon Valley
- Damian Rhodes, former NHL player
- Ron Rolston, ice hockey coach; head coach of the Buffalo Sabres (2012–2013)
- Jarkko Ruutu, former NHL player
- Donald G. Saari, game theorist
- Alexander King Sample, 12th bishop of the Roman Catholic Diocese of Marquette; 11th archbishop of the Roman Catholic Archdiocese of Portland in Oregon
- John Scott, former NHL player; 2016 NHL All-Star captain and MVP
- Donald Shell, author of the Shell sort
- Karl A. Smith, metallurgical engineer, academic and author
- Andy Sutton, former NHL player
- Marek W. Urban, American Chemical Society fellow
- John Vartan, businessman, developer, banker, restaurateur and philanthropist
- Dave Walter, former NFL player
- Leonard C. Ward, former chief of the Army Division (National Guard Bureau)

== See also ==
- List of colleges and universities in Michigan
