= Lyon Bradley King =

American engineer

- Education: University of Michigan
- Engineering career
- Discipline: Space Propulsion; Plasma Physics; Optical Fluid Diagnostics
- Institutions: Michigan Technological University
- Awards: Richard and Elizabeth Henes Professor of Space Systems Engineering

L. Brad King is an American engineer. He is the CEO and co-founder of Orbion Space Technology, an aerospace company based in Houghton, MI, specializing in Hall-effect thrusters. He is also the CEO of Aerophysics Inc, a company based in Allouez, MI, providing "intelligence, surveillance, and reconnaissance" to the government. He is a Richard and Elizabeth Henes Endowed Professor for Space Systems in Mechanical Engineering-Engineering Mechanics at Michigan Technological University.

== Early life and education ==
King was born in Calumet, Michigan and graduated from Calumet High School in 1989. He holds a master's and a Ph.D. in Aerospace Engineering from the University of Michigan. He did a postdoctoral fellowship at the National Institute of Standards and Technology (NIST) in Boulder, Colorado.

== Career ==
King was hired at Michigan Technological University in 2000 and developed a research program centered around advance space propulsion technologies, including Hall-effect thrusters, ion engines, and arcjets.

King, along with Jason Sommervile, founded Orbion Space Technology in 2016. The company was sold to York Space Systems on March 2026.

King is the Richard and Elizabeth Henes Professor of Space Systems Engineering at Michigan Technological University.

King is a 2003 recipient of the Presidential Early Career Award from President George W. Bush and was selected as a recipient of the Society of Automotive Engineers Ralph R. Teetor Award for engineering educators in 2006.

== Research interests ==
King's research experience in the broader field of plasma physics includes such subjects as the design of the in-situ electrostatic probes, ion-energy analysis and time-of-flight mass spectrometry, Doppler laser cooling of trapped ions, optical flow diagnostics, and antimatter confinement. He holds patents for generating electrospray from a ferrofluid, self-regenerating nanotips for low-power electric propulsion cathodes, and a method and apparatus for improving efficiency of a Hall-effect thruster.

== Select publications ==
- Radiation-induced solidification of ionic liquid under extreme electric field (2016) Terhune, K.J., King, L.B., He, K., Cumings, J., Nanotechnology
- Performance Comparison Between a Magnesium- and Xenon-Fueled 2 Kilowatt Hall Thruster (2016) Hopkins, M.A. and King, L.B. Journal of Propulsion and Power
- Ionic liquid ferrofluid interface deformation and spray onset under electric and magnetic stresses (2014) B. A. Jackson, K. J. Terhune and L. B. King, Physics of FluidsJournal of Propulsion and Power
