= 2011 NCAA Division II women's basketball tournament =

- Teams: 64
- Finals site: St. Joseph Civic Arena, (Missouri) St. Joseph, MO
- Champions: Clayton State Lakers (1st title)
- Runner-up: Michigan Tech Huskies (1st title game)
- Semifinalists: Northwest Missouri State Bearcats (1st Final Four); Shaw Bears (1st Final Four)
- Winning coach: Dennis Cox (1st title)
- MOP: Teshymia Tillman (Clayton State)

The 2011 NCAA Division II women's basketball tournament involved 64 schools playing in a single-elimination tournament to determine the national champion of women's NCAA Division II college basketball as a culmination of the 2010–11 basketball season.

== Qualification and tournament format ==
The champions of the 22 basketball conferences qualified automatically. An additional 42 teams were selected as at-large participants by the selection committee. The first three rounds of the tournament were organized in regions comprising eight participants in groups of two or three conferences (two in the Central and Midwest regions). The eight regional winners then met at the Elite Eight for the final three rounds held at the St. Joseph Civic Arena in St. Joseph, Missouri.

=== Automatic qualifiers ===
The following teams automatically qualified for the tournament as the winner of their conference championships:

Team	Conference	Region
Cal Poly Pomona	CCAA	West
Goldey–Beacom	CACC	East
Shaw	CIAA	Atlantic
Barton	Conference Carolinas	Southeast
C.W. Post	ECC	East
Michigan Tech	GLIAC	Midwest
Lewis	GLVC	Midwest
Alaska Anchorage	GNAC	West
Arkansas Tech	Gulf South	South
Texas–Permian Basin	Heartland	South Central
Texas Woman's	Lone Star	South Central
Northwest Missouri State	MIAA	South Central
Bentley	Northeast-10	East
Winona State	NSIC	Central
Grand Canyon	Pacific West	West
Georgia College	Peach Belt	Southeast
Edinboro	PSAC	Atlantic
Fort Lewis	RMAC	Central
Tusculum	SAC	Southeast
Fort Valley State	SIAC	South
Florida Southern	Sunshine State	South
Glenville State	WVIAC	Atlantic

=== Qualified teams ===
South Region – Russellville, Arkansas
Seed	School	Conference	Record	Qualification
#1	Arkansas Tech	Gulf South	27–2	Conference champion
#2	Delta State	Gulf South	26–3	At-large
#3	Florida Southern	Sunshine State	25–4	Conference champion
#4	Florida Tech	Sunshine State	23–8	At-large
#5	Tampa	Sunshine State	21–7	At-large
#6	Ouachita Baptist	Gulf South	20–8	At-large
#7	North Alabama	Gulf South	21–6	At-large
#8	Fort Valley State	SIAC	22–9	Conference champion
Midwest Region – Houghton, Michigan
Seed	School	Conference	Record	Qualification
#1	Michigan Tech	GLIAC	26–2	Conference champion
#2	Quincy	GLVC	25–3	At-large
#3	Wisconsin–Parkside	GLVC	22–6	At-large
#4	Grand Valley State	GLIAC	20–7	At-large
#5	Drury	GLVC	19–9	At-large
#6	Missouri S&T	GLVC	20–7	At-large
#7	Kentucky Wesleyan	GLVC	17–9	At-large
#8	Lewis	GLVC	15–15	Conference champion
South Central Region – Tahlequah, Oklahoma
Seed	School	Conference	Record	Qualification
#1	Northeastern State	Lone Star	24–4	At-large
#2	Northwest Missouri State Bearcats	MIAA	24–4	Conference champion
#3	Tarleton State	Lone Star	24–4	At-large
#4	Washburn	MIAA	22–6	At-large
#5	Central Oklahoma	MIAA	20–9	At-large
#6	Southeastern Oklahoma State	Lone Star	20–7	At-large
#7	Texas Woman's	Lone Star	22–10	Conference champion
#8	Texas–Permian Basin	Heartland	21–7	Conference champion
West Region – Pomona, California
Seed	School	Conference	Record	Qualification
#1	Cal Poly Pomona	CCAA	25–4	Conference champion
#2	Grand Canyon	Pacific West	27–2	Conference champion
#3	Cal State Monterey Bay	CCAA	26–3	At-large
#4	Western Washington	GNAC	26–3	At-large
#5	Alaska Anchorage	GNAC	25–6	Conference champion
#6	Dixie State	Pacific West	24–3	At-large
#7	Seattle Pacific	GNAC	20–8	At-large
#8	Cal State San Bernardino	CCAA	21–7	

Central Region – Durango, Colorado
Seed	School	Conference	Record	Qualification
#1	Fort Lewis	RMAC	28–2	Conference champion
#2	Metropolitan State	RMAC	27–2	At-large
#3	Wayne State (Neb.)	NSIC	25–3	At-large
#4	Northern State	NSIC	20–8	At-large
#5	Concordia University, Saint Paul	NSIC	19–9	At-large
#6	Colorado Christian	RMAC	18–10	At-large
#7	Winona State	NSIC	21–8	Conference champion
#8	Adams State College	RMAC	21–9	At-large
Atlantic Region – Edinboro, Pennsylvania
Seed	School	Conference	Record	Qualification
#1	Edinboro	PSAC	26–3	Conference champion
#2	Johnson C. Smith	CIAA	24–4	At-large
#3	West Liberty	WVIAC	24–6	At-large
#4	Charleston (W.Va.)	WVIAC	24–7	At-large
#5	California (Pa.)	PSAC	22–7	At-large
#6	Millersville	PSAC	22–6	At-large
#7	Glenville State	WVIAC	23–8	Conference champion
#8	Shaw	CIAA	21–11	Conference champion
East Region – Waltham, Massachusetts
Seed	School	Conference	Record	Qualification
#1	Bentley	NE-10	25–4	Conference champion
#2	Holy Family	CACC	23–4	At-large
#3	Franklin Pierce	NE-10	24–7	At-large
#4	Assumption	NE-10	21–7	At-large
#5	Saint Rose	NE-10	21–7	At-large
#6	Pace	NE-10	22–8	At-large
#7	Goldey–Beacom	CACC	18–11	Conference champion
#8	Seattle Pacific	ECC	17–12	Conference champion
Southeast Region – Morrow, Georgia
Seed	School	Conference	Record	Qualification
#1	Clayton State	Peach Belt	29–1	At-large
#2	Lander	Peach Belt	27–3	At-large
#3	South Carolina Aiken	Peach Belt	26–5	At-large
#4	Georgia College	Peach Belt	22–6	Conference champion
#5	Barton	Conference Carolinas	25–4	Conference champion
#6	Tusculum	SAC	21–8	Conference champion
#7	Wingate	SAC	19–10	At-large
#8	Francis Marion	Peach Belt	18–9	At-large

== Regionals ==
=== South – Russellville, Arkansas ===
Location: Tucker Coliseum Host: Arkansas Tech University

First round Round of 64; March 11
1	Arkansas Tech	102
8	Fort Valley State	65
4	Florida Tech	56
5	Tampa	54
3	Florida Southern	87
6	Ouachita Baptist	74
2	Delta State	56
7	North Alabama	47

Second round Round of 32; March 12
1	Arkansas Tech	83
4	Florida Tech	74
3	Florida Southern	67
2	Delta State	72

Third Round; Sweet 16; March 14
1	Arkansas Tech	85
2	Delta State	77

=== Midwest – Houghton, Michigan ===
Location: Student Development Center Gymnasium Host: Michigan Technological University

First round Round of 64; March 11
1	Michigan Tech	72
8	Lewis	56
4	Grand Valley State	60
5	Drury	67
3	Wisconsin–Parkside	73
6	Missouri S&T	55
2	Quincy	85
7	Kentucky Wesleyan	72

Second round Round of 32; March 12
1	Michigan Tech	70
5	Drury	51
3	Wisconsin–Parkside	73
2	Quincy	62

Third Round; Sweet 16; March 14
1	Michigan Tech	69
3	Wisconsin–Parkside	57

=== South Central – Tahlequah, Oklahoma ===
Location: Dobbins Fieldhouse Host: Northeastern State University

First round Round of 64; March 11
1	Northeastern State	88
8	Tex. Permian Basin	68
4	Washburn	64
5	Central Okla.	65
3	Tarleton State	86
6	Southeastern Okla.	75
2	Northwest Mo. State	92
7	Texas Woman's	73

Second round Round of 32; March 12
1	Northeastern State	60
5	Central Okla.	68
3	Tarleton State	61
2	Northwest Mo. State	77

Third Round; Sweet 16; March 14
5	Central Okla.	70
2	Northwest Mo. State	82

=== West – Pomona, California ===
Location: Kellogg Gymnasium Host: California State Polytechnic University, Pomona

First round Round of 64; March 11
1	Cal Poly Pomona	71
8	Cal St. San Bern.	43
4	Western Washington	48
5	Alaska Anchorage	55
3	Cal St. Monterey Bay	68
6	Dixie State	59
2	Grand Canyon	53
7	Seattle Pacific	51

Second round Round of 32; March 12
1	Cal Poly Pomona	67
5	Alaska Anchorage	47
3	Cal St. Monterey Bay	35
2	Grand Canyon	55

Third Round; Sweet 16; March 14
1	Cal Poly Pomona	68
2	Grand Canyon	61

=== Central – Durango, Colorado ===
Location: Whalen Gymnasium Host: Fort Lewis College

First round Round of 64; March 11
1	Fort Lewis	66
8	Adams State	77
4	Northern State	74
5	Concordia–St. Paul	70
3	Wayne State (Neb.)	78
6	Colorado Christian	73
2	Metro State	70
7	Winona State	56

Second round Round of 32; March 12
8	Adams State	66
4	Northern State	49
3	Wayne State (Neb.)	55
2	Metro State	74

Third Round; Sweet 16; March 14
8	Adams State	36
2	Metro State	49

=== Atlantic – Edinboro, Pennsylvania ===
Location: McComb Fieldhouse Host: Edinboro University of Pennsylvania

First round Round of 64; March 11
1	Edinboro	51
8	Shaw	72
4	Charleston (W.Va.)	59
5	California (Pa.)	75
3	West Liberty	71
6	Millersville	68
2	Johnson C. Smith	74
7	Glenville State	69

Second round Round of 32; March 12
8	Shaw	70
5	California (Pa.)	63
3	West Liberty	72
2	Johnson C. Smith	78

Third Round; Sweet 16; March 14
8	Shaw	74
2	Johnson C. Smith	54

=== East – Waltham, Massachusetts ===
Location: Dana Center Host: Bentley College

First round Round of 64; March 11
1	Bentley	75
8	C.W. Post	67
4	Assumption	74
5	Saint Rose	64
3	Franklin Pierce	62
6	Pace	64
2	Holy Family	79
7	Goldey–Beacom	67

Second round Round of 32; March 13
1	Bentley	77
4	Assumption	64
6	Pace	89
2	Holy Family	72

Third Round; Sweet 16; March 15
1	Bentley	64
6	Pace	61

=== Southeast – Morrow, Georgia ===
Location: Athletics & Fitness Center Host: Clayton State University

First round Round of 64; March 11
1	Clayton State	79
8	Francis Marion	54
4	Georgia College	79
5	Barton	80
3	S.C. Aiken	69
6	Tusculum	66
2	Lander	86
7	Wingate	54

Second round Round of 32; March 12
1	Clayton State	97
5	Barton	71
3	S.C. Aiken	68
2	Lander	85

Third Round; Sweet 16; March 14
1	Clayton State	76
2	Lander	60

== Elite Eight – St. Joseph, Missouri ==
Location: St. Joseph Civic Arena Host: Missouri Western State University

Quarterfinals; Elite Eight; Tuesday, March 22
S1	Arkansas Tech	58
MW1	Michigan Tech	69
SC2	Northwest Mo. State	78
W1	Cal Poly Pomona	65
C2	Metro State	45
A8	Shaw	46
E1	Bentley	61
SE1	Clayton State	84

Semifinals; Final Four; Wednesday, March 23
MW1	Michigan Tech	89
SC2	Northwest Mo. State	78
A8	Shaw	46
SE1	Clayton State	63

National Championship; Friday, March 25
MW1	Michigan Tech	50
SE1	Clayton State	69

== See also ==
- 2011 NCAA Division I women's basketball tournament
- 2011 NCAA Division III women's basketball tournament
- 2011 NCAA Division II men's basketball tournament
- 2011 Women's National Invitation Tournament
- 2011 NAIA Division I women's basketball tournament
- 2011 NAIA Division II women's basketball tournament
