= Brett Engelhardt =

American ice hockey Forward

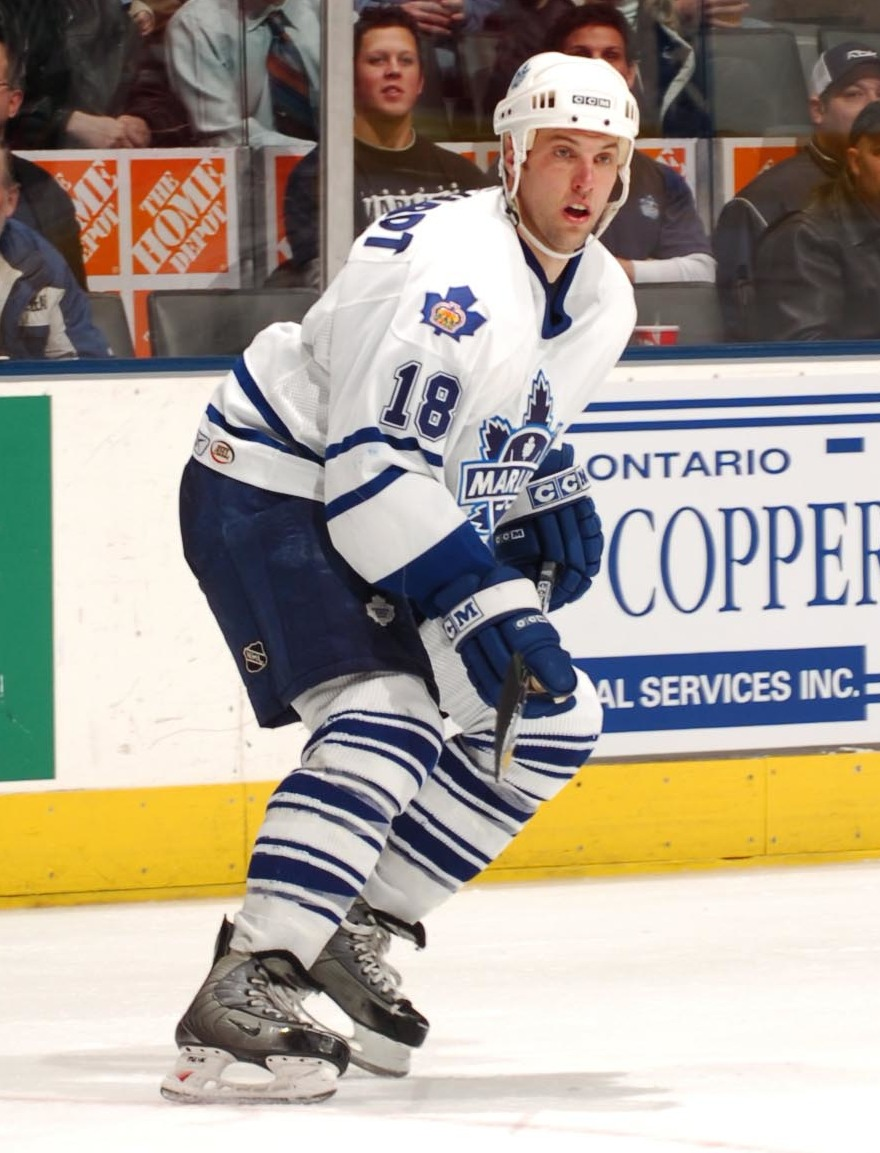
- Engelhardt with the Toronto Marlies during the 2006-07 season
- Born: August 12, 1980 (age 45) Sheboygan, Wisconsin, USA
- Height: 6 ft 2 in (188 cm)
- Weight: 211 lb (96 kg; 15 st 1 lb)
- Position: Right wing
- Shot: Right
- Played for: Philadelphia Phantoms; Toronto Marlies; Grand Rapids Griffins; Hamilton Bulldogs; Augsburger Panther; Hamburg Freezers; EHC Liwest Black Wings Linz
- NHL draft: Undrafted
- Playing career: 2004–2013

Brett Engelhardt (born August 12, 1980, in Sheboygan, Wisconsin) is an American former professional ice hockey forward who last played for EHC Liwest Black Wings Linz of the Erste Bank Eishockey Liga (EBEL).

== Playing career ==
After playing four seasons with the Michigan Tech Huskies, he began his professional career with the Philadelphia Phantoms organization. Having started the next season in the ECHL, he joined the St. Johns Maple Leafs. He followed the team when it moved to Toronto to become the Marlies. Before the beginning of the 2007-08 season, he signed a contract with the Detroit Red Wings. He did not make the team in training camp and joined the Grand Rapids Griffins. In February 2008, the Red Wings traded him to the Montreal Canadiens for center Francis Lemieux.

On May 8, 2008, Engelhardt signed a contract with German team, Augsburger Panther of the DEL for the 2008–09 season. After scoring a modest 35 points in his first season, Brett broke out offensively the following year leading the Panthers with 28 goals and scoring 54 points in only 47 games. On June 28, 2010, he then signed with fellow DEL team, the Hamburg Freezers to a one-year contract.

== Career statistics ==
			Regular Season					Playoffs
Season	Team	League	GP	G	A	Pts	PIM	GP	G	A	Pts	PIM
1997–98	U.S. National Development Team	USDP	46	3	5	8	48	—	—	—	—	—
1998–99	Green Bay Gamblers	USHL	54	12	18	30	76	6	2	0	2	8
1999–00	Green Bay Gamblers	USHL	58	24	27	51	167	14	7	8	15	28
2000–01	Michigan Tech	WCHA	35	6	10	16	73	—	—	—	—	—
2001–02	Michigan Tech	WCHA	38	16	16	32	40	—	—	—	—	—
2002–03	Michigan Tech	WCHA	38	17	15	32	67	—	—	—	—	—
2003–04	Michigan Tech	WCHA	38	12	13	25	68	—	—	—	—	—
2003–04	Philadelphia Phantoms	AHL	2	0	1	1	0	—	—	—	—	—
2004–05	Gwinnett Gladiators	ECHL	21	14	9	23	18	—	—	—	—	—
2004–05	St. John's Maple Leafs	AHL	44	7	5	12	32	4	1	0	1	2
2005–06	Toronto Marlies	AHL	71	12	32	44	89	5	1	1	2	6
2006–07	Toronto Marlies	AHL	79	25	23	48	129	—	—	—	—	—
2007–08	Grand Rapids Griffins	AHL	42	8	8	16	33	—	—	—	—	—
2007–08	Hamilton Bulldogs	AHL	25	5	5	10	29	—	—	—	—	—
2008–09	Augsburger Panther	DEL	50	16	19	35	114	4	0	1	1	2
2009–10	Augsburger Panther	DEL	47	28	26	54	97	14	4	7	11	28
2010–11	Hamburg Freezers	DEL	45	21	17	38	84	—	—	—	—	—
2011–12	Hamburg Freezers	DEL	52	23	16	39	38	5	0	0	0	4
2012–13	EHC Liwest Black Wings Linz	EBEL	53	19	19	38	64	13	2	5	7	24
DEL totals			194	88	78	166	333	23	4	8	12	34
