= David R. Shonnard =

American engineer

David Shonnard
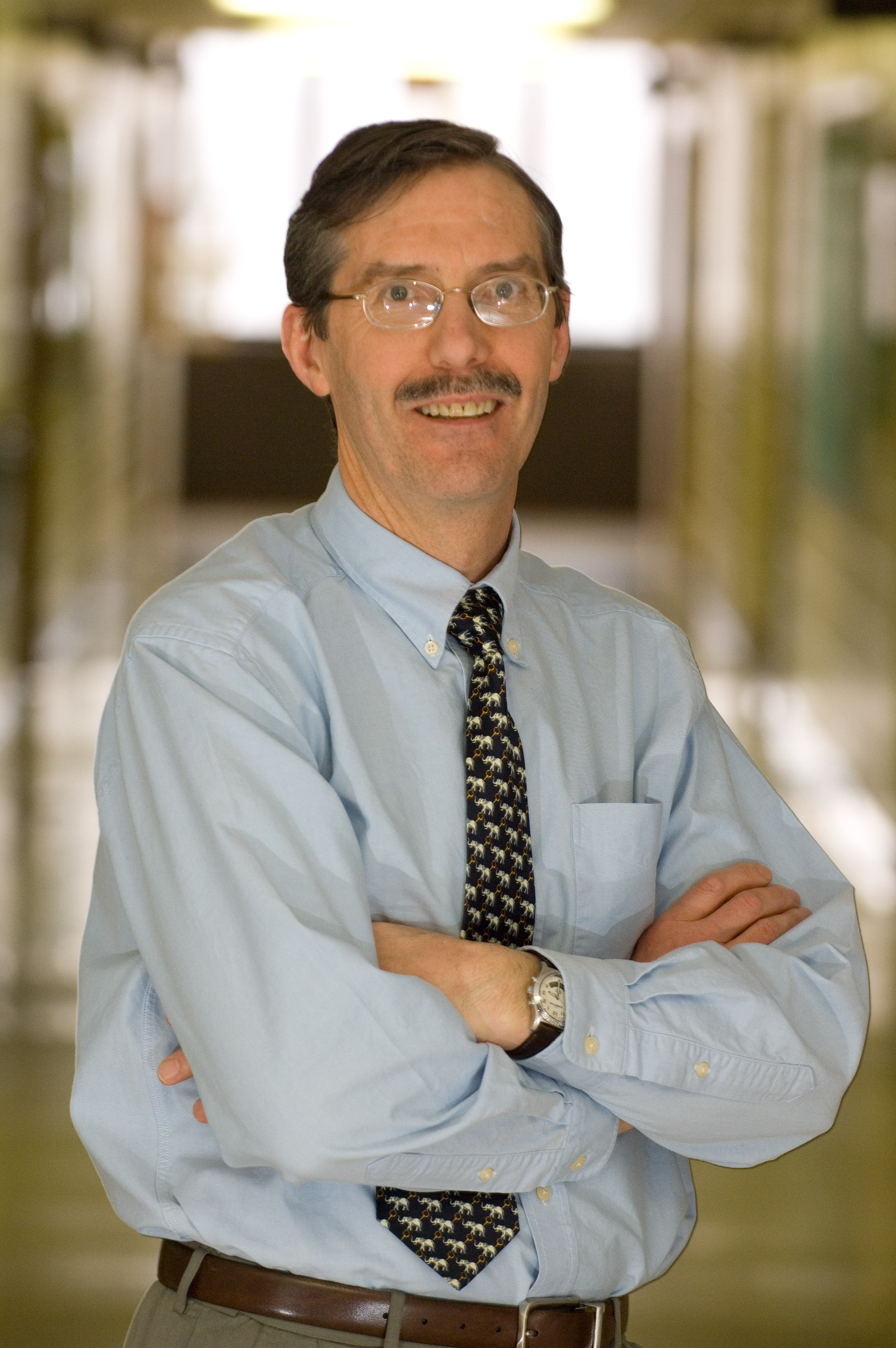
- David Shonnard (2006)
- Education: University of Nevada, Reno (BS); University of California, Davis (MS, PhD)
- Engineering career
- Discipline: Chemical Engineering; Bioprocess Engineering; Renewable Bio-Based Fuels
- Institutions: Michigan Technological University
- Awards: Richard and Bonnie Robbins Endowed Chair of Sustainable Use of Materials; ASEE ChE Division's Ray W. Fahien Award

David R. Shonnard is an American engineer. He is a Richard and Bonnie Robbins Chair in Sustainable Use of Materials and former director of the Michigan Technological University Sustainable Futures Institute. He has expertise in systems analysis for sustainability, environmental life cycle assessments of renewable energy technologies, and chemical recycling of waste plastics for a circular economy.

== Biography ==
Shonnard earned a Ph.D. from the University of California at Davis and had appointments at Lawrence Livermore National Laboratory and the University of California at Berkeley prior to joining Michigan Technological University in 1993. He has served on advisory committees for the DOE, UDSA, and the REMADE Institute in areas of biomass research and development and materials circular economy. He is co-author of two green engineering and sustainable engineering textbooks and has published over 200 works appearing in peer-reviewed research journals, technical reports, and conference proceedings.

== Research interests ==
Shonnard has broad research interests that include diffusion and adsorption of pollutants in soils, atmospheric transport of hazardous compounds, environmental risk assessment, in-situ subsurface remediation, environmentally-conscious design of chemical processes, advanced biofuels reaction engineering, and applications of pyrolysis to waste plastics recycling. Sponsors of his research program include federal (NSF, DOE, DARPA, USDA, FAA), state (MI MTRAC), and numerous industrial firms. He holds patents in enzymatic and chemical conversion technologies and is founder of a company, SuPyRec, to commercialize chemical recycling of waste plastics.

== Select publications ==
- Kulas, Daniel G.; Zolghadr, Ali; Chaudhari, Utkarsh S.; Shonnard, David R. (2023). "Economic and environmental analysis of plastics pyrolysis after secondary sortation of mixed plastic waste". Journal of Cleaner Production. 384 135542: Article 135542. Bibcode:2023JCPro.38435542K. doi:10.1016/j.jclepro.2022.135542. ISSN 0959-6526. S2CID 254386536.
- Kulas, Daniel G.; Zolghadr, Ali; Shonnard, David R. (2022). "Liquid-fed waste plastic pyrolysis pilot plant: Effect of reactor volume on product yields". Journal of Analytical and Applied Pyrolysis. 166 105601. Bibcode:2022JAAP..16605601K. doi:10.1016/j.jaap.2022.105601.
- Byrne, Emily; Schaerer, Laura G.; Kulas, Daniel G.; Ankathi, Sharath K.; Putman, Lindsay I.; Codere, Kierstyn R.; Schum, Simeon K.; Shonnard, David R.; Techtmann, Stephen M. (2022). "Pyrolysis-Aided Microbial Biodegradation of High-Density Polyethylene Plastic by Environmental Inocula Enrichment Cultures". ACS Sustainable Chemistry & Engineering. 2022, 10, 6, 2022–2033 (6): 2022–2033. Bibcode:2022ASCE...10.2022B. doi:10.1021/acssuschemeng.1c05318. S2CID 246462337.
