= Blizzard T. Husky =

Sports mascot

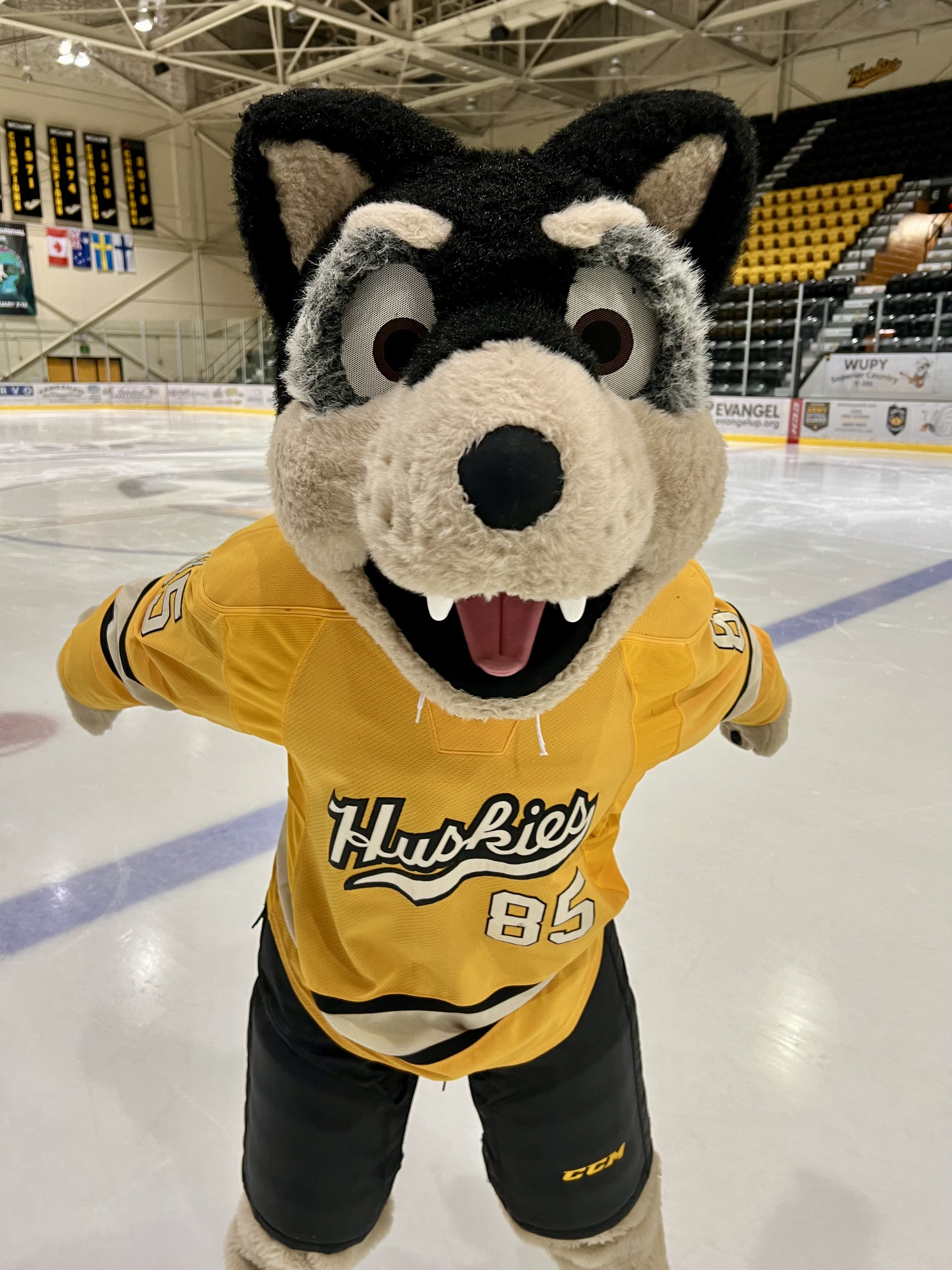
Blizzard T. Husky skating at the John MacInnes Student Ice Arena

Blizzard T. Husky is the costumed mascot of Michigan Technological University, a research university focused on science and engineering in the Upper Peninsula of the U.S. state of Michigan.

Blizzard appears at Michigan Tech home sporting events such as hockey, football, basketball, and volleyball. In addition, Blizzard often attends community and campus events throughout the year. Community members can request Blizzard to attend an event via a form on the athletics page.

Christened on January 31, 1997, Blizzard's name was chosen through a campus-wide vote. The "T" in Blizzard's name stands for "The", and their 85 jersey number represents the year MTU was founded (1885).

Blizzard occasionally travels, mostly to support critical MTU away games such as playoffs. Blizzard has also attended several Great Lakes Invitational tournaments over the years. In 2010, Blizzard became the first mascot to visit the Kennedy Space Center.
