= 2011 NAIA Division I men's basketball tournament =

College basketball tournament

- Teams: 32
- Finals site: Municipal Auditorium; Kansas City, Missouri
- Champions: Pikeville (1 title, 1 title game)
- Runner-up: Mountain State (4 title game)
- Semifinalists: Martin Methodist; Georgetown
- Chuck Taylor MVP: Trevor Setty (Pikeville)

The 2011 Buffalo Funds - NAIA Division I men's basketball tournament was held in March at Municipal Auditorium in Kansas City, Missouri. The 74th annual NAIA basketball tournament featured 32 teams playing in a single-elimination format.

== Awards and honors ==
- Leading scorer: Brandon Brown
- Leading rebounder: Ty Gough
- Coach of the Year: Kelly Wells
- Player of the Year: Trevor Setty
- Most consecutive tournament appearances: 20th, Georgetown (KY)
- Most tournament appearances: Georgetown (Ky.), 30th of 30, appearances to the NAIA Tournament

== 2011 NAIA bracket ==
First round March 16–17 | Second round March 18
1 | Robert Morris (Ill) | 77
Montana Western | 76
1 | Robert Morris | 74
16 | Lee | 55
- | Columbia (Mo.) | 67
16 | Lee (Tenn.) | 69
TOP TIER; March 16
9 | Oklahoma Baptist | 69
- | Pikeville (Ky.) | 76
- | Pikeville | 80
8 | Azusa Pacific | 75
- | Freed-Hardeman (Tenn.) | 79
8 | Azusa Pacific (Calif.) | 92
5 | Martin Methodist (Tenn.) | 84
- | William Jewell (Mo.) | 83
5 | Martin Methodist | 88
12 | Tougaloo | 77
- | Emmanuel (Ga.) | 58
12 | Tougaloo (Miss.) | 73
TOP TIER; March 17
13 | Biola (Calif.) | 59
- | Montana State-Northern | 48
13 | Biola | 71
4 | LSU Shreveport | 70
- | Life (Ga.) | 80
4 | LSU Shreveport | 106
3 | Mountain State | 83
- | Park (Mo.) | 58
3 | Mountain State | 84
- | Lindenwood | 67
- | Lindenwood (Mo.) | 78
14 | St. Catharine (Ky.) | 72
BOTTOM TIER; March 16
11 | Union (Tenn.) | 63
- | Carroll (Mont.) | 69
- | Carroll | 45
- | Rogers State | 66
- | Rogers State (Okla.) | 66
6 | Texas Wesleyan | 64
7 | Georgetown (Ky.) | 83
- | Olivet Nazarene (Ill.) | 76
7 | Georgetown | 77
- | McKendree | 59
- | McKendree (Ill.) | 75'
10 | Southern Nazarene (Okla.) | 62
BOTTOM TIER; March 17
15 | Evangel (Mo.) | 79
- | Xavier (La.) | 71
15 | Evangel | 62
2 | Concordia | 102
- | Southern Poly (Ga.) | 64
2 | Concordia (Calif.) | 96

Elite Eight; March 19
1 | Robert Morris | 77
- | Pikeville | 86
5 | Martin Methodist | 71
13 | Biola | 70
3 | Mountain State | 69
- | Rogers State | 62
7 | Georgetown | 69
2 | Concordia | 67

NAIA national semifinals March 21; 6pm & 8pm
- | Pikeville | 110
5 | Martin Methodist | 99
3 | Mountain State | 69
7 | Georgetown | 63

NAIA national championship March 22; 9pm
- | Pikeville | 83
3 | Mountain State | 76*

- * denotes overtime.

== See also ==
- 2011 NAIA Division I women's basketball tournament
- 2011 NCAA Division I men's basketball tournament
- 2011 NCAA Division II men's basketball tournament
- 2011 NCAA Division III men's basketball tournament
- 2011 NAIA Division II men's basketball tournament
