= 2011 NAIA Division I women's basketball tournament =

- Teams: 32
- Finals site: Oman Arena, Jackson, Tennessee
- Champions: Azusa Pacific Cougars (1st title, 2nd title game, 2nd Fab Four)
- Runner-up: Union University Bulldogs (8th title game, 12th Fab Four)
- Semifinalists: Freed–Hardeman Lions (3rd Fab Four); Shawnee State Bears (1st Fab Four)
- Coach of the year: T.J. Hardeman (Azusa Pacific)
- Player of the year: Whitney Ballinger; Meribeth Boehler (Campbellsville, Freed–Hardeman)
- Charles Stevenson Hustle Award: Maria Bagwell (Freed–Hardeman)
- Chuck Taylor MVP: Meribeth Boehler (Freed–Hardeman)
- Top scorer: Meribeth Boehler (Freed–Hardeman) (104 points)

The 2011 NAIA Division I women's basketball tournament was the tournament held by the NAIA to determine the national champion of women's college basketball among its Division I members in the United States and Canada for the 2010–11 basketball season.

In a rematch of the 2010 final, Azusa Pacific defeated two-time defending champions Union (TN) in the championship game, 65–59, to claim the Cougars' first NAIA national title.

The tournament was played at the Oman Arena in Jackson, Tennessee. This was the last of twenty-two consecutive tournaments played in Jackson.

== Qualification ==
The tournament field remained fixed at thirty-two teams, which were sorted into four quadrants of eight teams each. Within each quadrant, teams were seeded sequentially from one to eight based on record and season performance.

The tournament continued to utilize a simple single-elimination format.

== Bracket ==
First round
1	Oklahoma City	87
8	Montana Tech	45
5	Xavier Louisiana	63
4	Lee (TN)	53
3	Saint Xavier	60
6	Shawnee State	70
7	Texas Wesleyan	75
2	California Baptist	88
2	Westminster (UT)	60
7	Rogers State	56
6	William Woods	77
3	Biola	69
4	Olivet Nazarene	87
5	Southern Poly	79
8	Avila	37
1	Union (TN)	62
1	Azusa Pacific	75
8	Belhaven	61
5	Southern Nazarene	56
4	Lindsey Wilson	63
3	Columbia (MO)	64
6	Lubbock Christian	76
7	Evangel	38
2	Bethel (TN)	47
2	Freed–Hardeman	78
7	Shorter	62
6	Westmont	57
3	Lewis–Clark State	63
4	Langston	54
5	Vanguard	47
8	John Brown	51
1	Campbellsville	76

Second round
1	Oklahoma City	67
5	Xavier Louisiana	51
6	Shawnee State	64
2	California Baptist	58
2	Westminster (UT)	49
6	William Woods	40
4	Olivet Nazarene	69
1	Union (TN)	81
1	Azusa Pacific	71
4	Lindsey Wilson	67
6	Lubbock Christian	66
2	Bethel (TN)	60
2	Freed–Hardeman	71
3	Lewis–Clark State	50
4	Langston	67
1	Campbellsville	80

Quarterfinals
1	Oklahoma City	47
6	Shawnee State	54
2	Westminster (UT)	61
1	Union (TN)	78
1	Azusa Pacific	79
6	Lubbock Christian	54
2	Freed–Hardeman	79
1	Campbellsville	74

Semifinals
6	Shawnee State	40
1	Union (TN)	58
1	Azusa Pacific	58
2	Freed–Hardeman	46

National championship
1	Union (TN)	59
1	Azusa Pacific	65

== See also ==
- 2011 NAIA Division I men's basketball tournament
- 2011 NCAA Division I women's basketball tournament
- 2011 NCAA Division II women's basketball tournament
- 2011 NCAA Division III women's basketball tournament
- 2011 NAIA Division II women's basketball tournament
