= Structured academic controversy =

Type of cooperative learning strategy

Structured academic controversy is a type of cooperative learning strategy where controversial issues are learnt and discussed from multiple perspectives by small teams of students. It is a technique and a way discovered and designed especially for students to get engaged in a controversy and then guide them to seek consensus. Students in such teams learn about opinions and views of other people as well as put forth theirs and attempt to agree politely with what they are convinced and also try to convince people to what they disagree without hurting sentiments of the opponent teams.

== Working of SAC ==
The activity of SAC begins with the selection of a topic by the instructor with varied viewpoints (e.g., Political reign should be or not be in the hands of the youth.). The topic for discussion once selected is then imported to students who decide and divide accordingly into pairs or form groups based on the ideas they share and agree, and assigned on advocacy in the pairs. The group either receives supporting documents or researches the topic in the time available to them.
