= 2011 NCAA Division III women's basketball tournament =

- Teams: 64
- Finals site: Shirk Center, Bloomington, Illinois
- Champions: Amherst Lord Jeffs (1st title)
- Runner-up: WashU Bears (9th title game)
- Third place: Christopher Newport Captains (1st Final Four)
- Fourth place: Illinois Wesleyan Titans (1st Final Four)
- Winning coach: G.P. Gromacki (1st title)
- MOP: Caroline Stedman (Amherst)
- Attendance: 27,490

The 2011 NCAA Division III women's basketball tournament was the 30th annual tournament hosted by the NCAA to determine the national champion of Division III women's collegiate basketball in the United States.

Amherst defeated Washington University in St. Louis in the championship game, 64–55, to claim the Lord Jeffs' first Division III national title.

The championship rounds were hosted by Illinois Wesleyan University at the Shirk Center in Bloomington, Illinois.

== Bracket ==
=== Top left sectional ===
First round March 4, 2011; Regional sites
Chapman	60
Louisiana College	61
Orange, CA
George Fox	53
Occidental	46
UW Stevens Point	79
St. Norbert	69
Stevens Point, WI
Simpson	59
Concordia Moorhead	56
Coe	78
Minnesota–Morris	53
Cedar Rapids, IA
Lewis & Clark	66
Howard Payne	84
Illinois Wesleyan	82
Webster	70
Bloomington, IL
UW La Crosse	59
Wisconsin Lutheran	73

Second round March 5, 2011; Regional sites
Louisiana College	47
George Fox	63
UW Stevens Point	82
Simpson	75
Coe	79
Howard Payne	56
Illinois Wesleyan	84
Wisconsin Lutheran	69

Sectional semifinals March 11, 2011; Stevens Point, WI
George Fox	71
UW Stevens Point	63
Coe	74
Illinois Wesleyan	77

Sectional finals March 12, 2011; Stevens Point, WI
George Fox	60
Illinois Wesleyan	61

=== Bottom left sectional ===
First round March 4, 2011; Regional sites
Thomas More	53
Piedmont	44
Crestview Hills, KY
UW Whitewater	55
Mount Union	69
Hope	77
DePauw	65
Holland, MI
Denison	55
Washington St. Louis	71
Calvin	73
La Roche	37
Grand Rapids, MI
Chicago	76
Hanover	62
Juniata	62
Gallaudet	45
Huntingdon, PA
Greensboro	83
Saint Vincent	66

Second round March 5, 2011; Regional sites
Thomas More	76
Mount Union	63
Hope	52
Washington St. Louis	56
Calvin	62
Chicago	67
Juniata	55
Greensboro	57

Sectional semifinals March 11, 2011; Crestview Hills, KY
Thomas More	53
Washington St. Louis	72
Chicago	87
Greensboro	61

Sectional finals March 12, 2011; Crestview Hills, KY
Washington St. Louis	63
Chicago	58

=== Top right sectional ===
First round March 4, 2011; Regional sites
William Paterson	81
Keuka	47
Wayne, NJ
Colby	58
Stevens Tech	48
Lebanon Valley	83
Neumann	68
Annville, PA
Randolph-Macon	80
Bridgewater State	69
Christopher Newport	81
York (PA)	52
Newport News, VA
Johns Hopkins	76
Richard Stockton	68
Kean	80
Vassar	49
Union Township, NJ
Messiah	44
Western Conn. State	65

Second round March 5, 2011; Regional sites
William Paterson	58
Colby	53
Lebanon Valley	73
Randolph-Macon	56
Christopher Newport	81
Johns Hopkins	62
Kean	82
Western Conn. State	64

Sectional semifinals March 11, 2011; Annville, PA
William Paterson	61
Lebanon Valley	83
Christopher Newport	80
Kean	76

Sectional finals March 12, 2011; Annville, PA
Lebanon Valley	50
Christopher Newport	62

=== Bottom right sectional ===
First round March 4, 2011; Regional sites
Amherst	102
Husson	44
Amherst, MA
Baruch	65
Eastern Conn. State	76
Rochester	70
Daniel Webster	52
Rochester, NY
Williams	63
Muhlenberg	64
Bowdoin	74
Salve Regina	64
Brunswick, ME
Emmanuel (MA)	50
Mount Saint Mary	73
Geneseo State	62
DeSales	51
Geneseo, NY
Medaille	58
Babson	78

Second round March 5, 2011; Regional sites
Amherst	76
Eastern Conn. State	54
Rochester	69
Muhlenberg	74
Bowdoin	61
Mount Saint Mary	53
Geneseo State	53
Babson	65

Sectional semifinals March 11, 2011; Amherst, MA
Amherst	79
Muhlenberg	60
Bowdoin	58
Babson	61

Sectional finals March 12, 2011; Amherst, MA
Amherst	68
Babson	49

=== Final Four ===
Final Four; March 18, 2011; Bloomington, IL
Illinois Wesleyan	77
Washington St. Louis	87
Christopher Newport	59
Amherst	69

National championship March 19, 2011; Bloomington, IL
Washington St. Louis	55
Amherst	64
Third place
Illinois Wesleyan	58
Christopher Newport	64

== All-tournament team ==
- Caroline Stedman, Amherst
- Jaci Daigneault, Amherst
- Kathryn Berger, Washington University in St. Louis
- Chelsie Schweers, Christopher Newport
- Nikki Preston, Illinois Wesleyan

== See also ==
- 2011 NCAA Division I women's basketball tournament
- 2011 NCAA Division II women's basketball tournament
- 2011 NAIA Division I women's basketball tournament
- 2011 NAIA Division II women's basketball tournament
- 2011 NCAA Division III men's basketball tournament
