= Michigan Tech Huskies =

Intercollegiate sports teams of Michigan Technological University

- University: Michigan Technological University
- Nickname: Huskies
- NCAA: Division II; Division I (ice hockey)
- Conference: GLIAC (primary); CCHA (hockey); CCSA (Nordic skiing)
- Athletic director: Suzanne Sanregret
- Location: Houghton, Michigan
- Varsity teams: 14
- Football stadium: Sherman Field
- Basketball arena: Student Development Complex Gymnasium
- Other venues: MacInnes Student Ice Arena
- Colors: Black and gold
- Mascot: Blizzard T. Husky
- Fight song: "Fight Tech Fight!"
- Website: michigantechhuskies.com
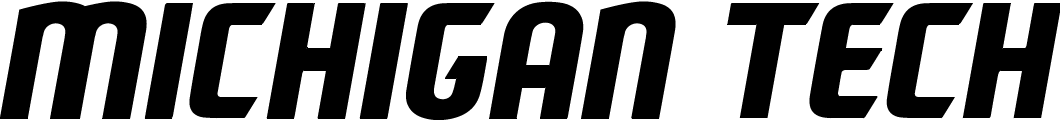

Michigan Technological University's sports teams are called the Huskies. The Huskies participate in NCAA Division II as a member of the Great Lakes Intercollegiate Athletic Conference (GLIAC), a member of the Central Collegiate Ski Association for men's and women's Nordic skiing, and NCAA Division I Central Collegiate Hockey Association for men's ice hockey.

== Varsity sports ==
Men's sports	Women's sports
Basketball	Basketball
Cross country running	Cross country
Football	Nordic skiing
Ice hockey	Soccer
Nordic skiing	Tennis
Tennis	Track & field ^{†}
Track & field^{†}	Volleyball
† – Track and field includes both indoor and outdoor.

=== Women's basketball ===
The Women's Basketball team started off the 2009–2010 season at number one, and stayed in the top five for the entire season. They went on to win the GLIAC Tournament, moving them on to the Elite 8 for two years in a row, this time in Missouri. The team also was ranked at number one for a large part of the season nationally. Along with this successful season, there were many records broken for Michigan Tech. These include: best winning percentage, most wins, most home wins, longest home winning streak, longest road winning streak, and best free throw percentage.

From his start in 2003 coaching the Women's Basketball team, head coach John Barnes lead the Huskies to success. Barnes won GLIAC coach of the year in 2005–2006 and again in 2008–2009. He was also named Women's Basketball Coaches Association Region coach of the year. Barnes holds under his belt 1 NCAA Elite 8 berth, 4 NCAA Tournament berths, 2 GLIAC North Division Championships in the 2007–2008 and 2008–2009 seasons, and 1 GLIAC Tournament Championships in the 2007–2008 season from his time with the Huskies.

Assistant coach Kim Cameron is finishing out her fifth year with the Women's Basketball team after being appointed to the position in September 2005. Cameron served as not only the recruitment and travel coordinator, but also coordinated the girls' basketball summer camps. Kim Cameron will be taking over the position of head coach for the Michigan Tech Huskies for the 2010–2011 after John Barnes resigned to become assistant coach for the Badgers at the University of Wisconsin–Madison.

Michigan Tech strongly supports their academic program. Each player on the team has at least a 3.0 grade point average. In 2009–2010, the MTU Women's Basketball team number one in the nation by the Women's Basketball Coaches Association for an overall team grade point average. The Michigan Tech Huskies had an outstanding 3.732 GPA. This was higher than any women's basketball team in any division two team.

The Michigan Tech Huskies reached the national championship (which is the farthest they've ever gone) on March 25, 2011 against the Clayton State University Lakers. They lost 69–50 at the Civic Center in St. Joseph's, MO. They did manage to fend off the Northwest Missouri State Bearcats in the final four with an 89–78 win. In the Elite Eight the Huskies managed to beat the number one ranked Arkansas Tech University Golden Suns with a 69–58 victory. All the Arkansas Tech fans were sure they were going to the championship so they had a whole section already reserved for them at the national championship game. In the Midwest Regional Championship the Michigan Tech Huskies defeated the University of Wisconsin–Parkside Rangers 69–57. In the second round Michigan Tech beat the Drury Panthers 60–51, and in the first round defeated the Lewis Flyers 72–56. This year also produced another GLIAC Championship team as they defeated the Tiffin Dragons in the first round 58–40, the Hillsdale Chargers 69–58, and the Ashland Eagles in the championship game 63–53. The Michigan Tech Huskies finished the season 31–3 with their only losses coming to Clayton State University 69–50, Concordia University–St. Paul 78–70, and Ferris State University 63–60.

The Michigan Tech Huskies are 2010–11 national Runners-up, 7-time GLIAC Champions, 25-time GLIAC Tournament Appearances, 18-time NCAA Tournament Appearances, and 4-time Midwest Region Champions.

=== Football ===
The football program at Michigan Tech began in 1920. The team plays home games at Sherman Field. On March 18, 2003 the football program was eliminated due to budgets cuts made by the university, but through alumni funding, the program was brought back ten days later. The 2004 football season brought the Huskies into the spotlight with the winning of a Great Lakes Intercollegiate Athletic Conference (GLIAC) championship. The 2004 season was also a highlight for the football program due to the "Bash at the Big House", a football game played at Michigan Stadium in Ann Arbor, Michigan against the rival Grand Valley State Lakers.

In 1981, head coach Jim Kapp retired after a six-year record of 41–30–2. During Kapp's first three years as coach and Ted Kearly's last three years the Huskies racked up a record of 52–12–1. In 1981, Ron Marciel was hired as head coach.

The winner of the annual game against the Northern Michigan Wildcats is awarded the Miner's Cup.

=== Men's ice hockey ===
The Men's ice hockey team is the only athletic program at MTU to compete in Division I athletics. The Huskies compete in the Central Collegiate Hockey Association. Michigan Tech has had a storied history from its inception in 1919, producing three national championships. The program has played in five different home arenas including the Amphidrome, Calumet Colosseum, Dee Stadium, and the MacInnes Student Ice Arena. The Husky hockey program is a charter member of the WCHA in 1951 and became a national powerhouse under the leadership of Coach John MacInnes during the 1960s, 1970s, and early 1980s. The team has won three NCAA Division I championships (1962, 1965, and 1975) and eight Western Collegiate Hockey Association championships (1962, 1965, 1969, 1971, 1974, 1976 and 2017).

The Huskies host and compete in the annual Great Lakes Invitational held in December of each year. The four-team tournament was played for the 48th year in 2012, with the Huskies defeating Western Michigan by a score of 4–0, to win their 10th GLI championship, and their first since 1980.

=== Nordic skiing ===
Like many schools in the northernmost regions of the United States MTU fields men's and women's Nordic skiing. The Huskies ski teams compete in the Central Collegiate Ski Association, an NCAA ski-only athletic conference. MTU has its own downhill ski/snowboard hill, Mont Ripley, just across Portage Lake from campus, and maintains extensive cross-country ski trails (used for mountain biking in summer).

=== Track and field ===
One of Michigan Technological University's Division II sports is men and women's outdoor track and field. The women's team came about in 1984, as an addition to the men's team. The school also funded an indoor track and field team until 1991 but had to cut its varsity status due to lack of funding for scholarship sports. Due to renovation of Sherman Field, the addition of a soccer field, and lack of support from the athletic director, the outdoor track was partially torn up and is not usable for track meets as of summer 2008. This means the current track team travels mostly in Minnesota, Wisconsin and the Lower Peninsula for meets, allowing them to continue a variety of competition.

=== Women's volleyball ===
The Women's volleyball team at Michigan Tech first formed in 1975 under Title IX. The first coach was Cheryl Depuydt, the Michigan Tech figure skating instructor. When football coach and athletic director, Ted Kearly, was in need of a women's athletic coach, Coach DePuydt, or Cheryl as she was known, volunteered to coach both the women's basketball and volleyball teams. She initially coached both teams without pay. Not only was she the first female coach at MTU, she was the first female instructor and served as chair of the department until her death in 2006, after a battle with cancer. Cheryl's work was crucial to developing Husky volleyball and is highly regarded for her role in the foundation of women's athletics at Michigan Tech.

MTU volleyball has qualified for the NCAA Women's Volleyball Championship Tournament ten times. The 2018 season was the last season the team qualified for the tournament. The Huskies advanced to the regional final three straight times from 1993 to 1996.

The program has made 18 appearances in the GLIAC Tournament, winning its sole championship in 1994.

MATT JENNINGS (2012–Present)

The Huskies are currently coached by Matt Jennings, a former NCAA D1 assistant coach at the University of Pittsburgh. Jennings is credited with rebuilding the program and was named the GLIAC Coach of the Year in 2017. He's one of two coaches in program history to be named coach of the year, Mary Kaminski being the other (1993, 1994). Jennings has led the Huskies to the NCAA Tournament in back to back seasons (2018 and 2017), falling to Lewis University in the opening round each time. In 2018, MTU volleyball cracked the AVCA Top 25 poll for the first time since 2003 and was in the top 5 in each of the Midwest regional rankings that season.

The Huskies have a 110–100 overall record under Jennings and have gone 69–52 in the GLIAC in the seven seasons he's coached the team.

ORLANDO GONZALES (2009–2011)

The team was coached by Orlando Gonzalez for 3 seasons. Gonzales and the Huskies advanced to the NCAA Tournament in 2009. His final year saw the team only win two matches overall, zero in conference. His three-year record at Tech was 21–61 overall and 13–41 in the GLIAC. Previous to coaching at Tech he coached at Rutgers University from 2005 to 2007. He also spent almost 10 years at head coach to an elite high-level club, USA Michigan Volleyball.

KRISTA MIKESCH (1999–2008)

The previous coach for the Huskies was Krista Mikesch, who was a former player at Tech. She was an outstanding athlete and was an All-American setter from 1993 to 1996. She started all four years that she attended MTU and her freshman year she helped the Huskies to a first ever NCAA tournament bid. Mikesch holds the school records for assists in a season (1,421) and career (5,093). She led the Huskies to the best season in school history in 1994 with a 30–3 record and a GLIAC title.

She coached two seasons as an assistant at Michigan Tech starting in April 1999 and then spent ten seasons as the head coach. Krista Mikesch resigned as head volleyball coach after the 2008 season, in which the Huskies finished with a 19–11 record and finished the year in the first round of the NCAA tournament. The Huskies qualified for the NCAA twice during her ten seasons as head coach, first in 2006 and then again in 2008, her final season at Tech.

Mikesch left Michigan Tech with an overall record of 137–165 overall and 81–97 in the GLIAC in her 11 seasons.

Mikesch was inducted into the Michigan Tech Athletics Hall of Fame on October 8, 2011.

ALAN SEGAL (1997–1998)

Alan Segal served as the head coach of the Huskies for two seasons, going 40–32 overall. In his first season, the Huskies won 23 times and advanced to the NCAA tournament.

MARY KAMINSKY (1984–1996)

With a career record of 258–202, Mary Kaminsky is the winningest coach in program history. Kaminsky was the 1994 AVCA DII National Coach of the Year, the only coach to have ever earned that honor. The 1994 season stands as the best in program history. At 30–3 overall, the Huskies won their only GLIAC championship that year and advanced to the regional final where they fell to UP rival Northern Michigan. NMU went on to win the 1994 national championship.

Michigan Tech played in four straight NCAA Tournaments (1993–96) and advanced to the regional championship in three of those seasons. Kaminsky had ten winning seasons as coach of the Huskies and during the mid 1990s had turned the program into a national power.

Kaminsky was inducted into the Michigan Tech Athletics Hall of Fame in November 2001.

All Americans

2018 – Olivia Ghormley (3rd), Laura DeMarchi (HM)

2008 – Jen Jung (HM)

1997 – Marisol Mosquera (1st)

1996 – Marisol Mosquera (1st)

1995 – Kristan Schuster (2nd)

1994 – Kim Hoppes (1st), Krista Valdivia (1st), Kristan Schuster (2nd)

1993 – Kim Hoppes (2nd)

Academic Honors

The volleyball team has had a reputation of having a great academic standing in the GLIAC conference. Well over 100 players have earned Great Lakes Intercollegiate Athletic Conference All-Academic Honors. Four players have been named Academic All American and two have earned the GLIAC's prestigious Commissioner's Award.

=== Cheer team ===
The Tech cheer team is a Coed noncompetitive squad that stunts, dances, and cheers on the sidelines of home women's and men's basketball games, and at Sherman Field for home football games.

== Notable athletic alumni ==
=== Hockey players ===
==== National Hockey League players ====
- Lou Angotti
- Garry Bauman
- Tom Bissett
- Chris Cichocki
- Steve Coates
- Chris Conner
- Pheonix Copley
- Chris Durno
- Tony Esposito
- John Grisdale
- Steve Jensen
- Al Karlander
- Tanner Kero
- Jujhar Khaira
- Geoff Kinrade
- Joel L'Esperance
- Michael Lauen
- Bob Lorimer
- George Lyle
- Darcy Martini
- Jim Mayer
- Randy McKay
- Al McLeod
- Gord McRae
- Glenn Merkosky
- Lyle Moffat
- Rob Murray
- Jim Nahrgang
- Davis Payne
- Brent Peterson
- Blake Pietila
- Jamie Ram
- Dave Reierson
- Mitch Reinke
- Damian Rhodes
- Matt Roy
- Jarkko Ruutu
- Geoff Sarjeant
- Andre Savage
- John Scott
- Lorne Stamler
- Tony Stiles
- Jim Storm
- Andy Sutton
- Bill Terry
- Tim Watters
- Brian Watts
- Clay Wilson
- Warren Young
- Mike Zuke

==== Other hockey players ====
- Greg Amadio – American Hockey League
- Herb Boxer – International Hockey League
- Paul Coppo – 1964 United States Olympic team
- Ken Desjardine – World Hockey Association
- Brett Engelhardt – American Hockey League
- Lars Helminen – SM-liiga
- Colin Murphy – American Hockey League
- Riley Nelson – American Hockey League
- Rob Nolan – ECHL
- Brett Olson – American Hockey League
- Bill Prentice – World Hockey Association
- Ron Rolston – ECHL
- Jimmy Roy – International Hockey League
- Tyler Shelast – American Hockey League

=== Football players ===
- Joe Berger – National Football League player
- Bobby Slowik - Houston Texans offensive coordinator

== Seasons ==
- 2021 Michigan Tech Huskies football team

== See also ==
- Blizzard T. Husky
- Huskies Pep Band
