= Brusseau =

Brusseau is a French surname. Notable people with the surname include:

- Gaëtan Brusseau (born 1965), French footballer
- James Brusseau, French philosopher
- Thierry Brusseau (born 1964), French athlete

== See also ==
- Brosseau
