= Brousseau =

Brousseau is a French surname. It can refer to the following people:

- Alfred Brousseau (1907 – 1988), American educator, photographer and mathematician
- Caleb Brousseau (born 1988), Canadian para-alpine skier
- Gino Brousseau (born 1966), Canadian volleyball player
- Jean-Baptiste Brousseau (1841 – 1925), Canadian lawyer, journalist and political figure in Quebec
- Jean-Docile Brousseau (1825 – 1908), Canadian politician and newspaper owner
- Joseph Brousseau (1733–1797), French architect
- Julie Brousseau (born 2006), Canadian swimmer
- Kate Brousseau (1862–1938), American professor and researcher
- Paul Brousseau (b. 1973), retired professional ice hockey player
- Raymond Brousseau (1938–2021), Canadian film director and artist

== See also ==
- Brosseau
