= List of The Curse of Oak Island episodes =

The Curse of Oak Island is a reality television series that premiered on January 5, 2014. The program features the Oak Island mystery. As of November 4, 2025, 231 episodes of The Curse of Oak Island have aired. The thirteenth season premiered on November 4, 2025.

== Series overview ==
=== Original series ===
Season	Episodes	Originally released	
Season	Episodes	First released	Last released
1	5	January 5, 2014	February 9, 2014
2	10	November 4, 2014	January 13, 2015
3	13	November 10, 2015	February 2, 2016
4	16	November 15, 2016	February 21, 2017
5	16	November 7, 2017	March 6, 2018
6	22	November 13, 2018	May 7, 2019
7	23	November 2, 2019	April 28, 2020
8	25	November 10, 2020	May 4, 2021
9	25	November 2, 2021	May 3, 2022
10	25	November 15, 2022	May 16, 2023
11	25	November 7, 2023	April 30, 2024
12	25	November 12, 2024	May 20, 2025
13	25	November 4, 2025	May 2026

=== Series spin-off: Beyond Oak Island ===
Season	Episodes	Originally released	
Season	Episodes	First released	Last released
1	8	November 17, 2020	January 26, 2021
2	8	January 4, 2022	March 15, 2022
3	12	October 4, 2022	January 31, 2023

== Episodes ==
=== Season 1 (2014) ===
No. overall	No. in season	Title	Original release date	U.S. viewers (millions)
1	1	"What Lies Below"	January 5, 2014	2.53
Brothers Marty and Rick Lagina travel from Michigan to Oak Island, determined to resume the search for treasure on the island and solve the Oak Island mystery. They begin drilling in the area of the famed "money pit" and discover pottery from far underground. Five months later they return to explore an abandoned shaft called Borehole 10–X, dug by Dan Blankenship in the 1970s with a video camera. While using an airlift to recover artifacts at 10-X, Rick discovers a wooden "tusk" poking out of the water at Smiths Cove. A small piece of metal is recovered from the 10–X spoils.
2	2	"The Mystery of Smith's Cove"	January 12, 2014	2.35
A scuba team that includes Marty and his son Alex prepares to dive the water around Smith's Cove. At 10–X, small bones thought to be from cats are found in the 10–X spoils. The dive team at Smiths Cove find anomalous stones pointing to the money pit. Later, while digging on the shore at Smiths Cove, the team find coconut fibres. Craig Tester has the fibres tested and the result is that they are dated to between 1260 and 1400 A.D. with 95% confidence.
3	3	"Voices from the Grave"	January 19, 2014	2.33
During a meeting at Dan Blankenship's house, the team discusses a plank that Fred Nolan believes is in the Oak Island swamp. Dan says that there are also oak tree stumps in the swamp and that he believes the swamp is man-made. The team then clear away trees so that the swamp can be drained. Rick receives a telephone call from Lee Lamb, daughter of Robert Restall, who died with his son Rick in 1965 while searching for the Oak Island treasure. Lee visits the island with Andrew Demont, who was the only survivor of the accident that killed the Restalls. At Smiths Cove, Andrew Demont explains to Lee Lamb how her father and brother died. Later, Lee gives Rick a map made by her brother and loans Rick her brother's journals detailing the time that he spent on the island. The narrator explains how the Restalls discovered a spiral tunnel near the money pit but died before they could investigate it. Later, paranormal investigators are invited to the island. The team begins to drain the swamp.
4	4	"The Secret of Solomon's Temple"	January 26, 2014	2.72
While the swamp drains, a Norwegian writer, Petter Amundsen presents the team with his claim that the first edition of the works of William Shakespeare includes clues leading the reader to Oak Island and also describes the treasure, which includes the menorah of King Solomon. His theory is put to the test and shows some promise so the team decides to investigate a part of the swamp designated the "Mercy point". Marty and Rick bring in some metal detecting experts who examine the swamp. Rick believes that they have found the treasure vault.
5	5	"The Find"	February 9, 2014	2.97
Data from the metal detection indicates there are interesting targets at the Mercy point. While local diver, Tony Sampson, is preparing to dive in the swamp, an antique Spanish 8 maravedí copper coin is found. Tony Sampson is unable to find anything else except strange, flat stones. The team shows the coin to Dan Blankenship. At a meeting in the war room, the team decides to continue the quest.

=== Season 2 (2014–2015) ===
No. overall	No. in season	Title	Original release date	U.S. viewers (millions)
6	1	"Once In, Forever In"	November 4, 2014	2.60
The Spanish coin found last season is cleaned and dated to 1652. After advice from experts, the team returns to Oak Island and begins searching the swamp with a metal detector again while it is covered with ice and snow. A large target is identified. Diver Tony Sampson discovers a tree stump in the swamp which is strange, as oak trees cannot grow in the swamp. In the war room, which is no longer at Dave Blankenship's house, the team receives news that proposed changes to current legislation may detrimentally affect attempts to recover the Oak Island treasure. With this news, it is decided to start drilling at the money pit.
7	2	"Return To The Money Pit"	November 11, 2014	2.15
The team drills in the area of the money pit but is unable to drill through underground debris. Dan Blankenship suggests a new place to dig. Paul Troutman, son of a previous treasure hunter, visits the island and talks to the team in the war room. He shows them a film of the devastation to the island during the Dunfield excavations in 1965/66. In the film, his father stands in front of the camera and points to a mysterious piece of wood. While metal detecting on the shoreline, Gary Drayton uncovers a 17th century military button. At another location, he discovers what appears to be another coin. Drilling at the money pit area is suspended when the drill rig is found to be insufficient for the task. Treasure hunter J. Hutton Pulitzer and his cousin meet with the team at a local pub in the evening to discuss his theory that treasures from Solomon's Temple could be buried on Oak Island and later shows them alleged evidence to support his claim.
8	3	"The Eight-Pointed Star"	November 18, 2014	2.23
J. Hutton Pulitzer and his cousin meet with the team at the war room to continue his theory that Phoenicians visited the island over 2,500 years ago and left behind the Ark of the Covenant. At the money pit, drilling begins with an aim to reach a tunnel made by The Halifax Company in 1867. On the south shore, team members search for coins and metal artifacts with a metal detector. They find two 18th century British coins but little else to validate J. Hutton Pulitzer's theory. The team gets new information that the proposed legislation that threatened treasure hunting on the island has been defeated. Drilling at the money pit continues to be unsuccessful.
9	4	"The Breakthrough"	November 25, 2014	2.15
At the money pit area, the team is drilling, trying to find the location of the original money pit, which has been lost over time, along with a mysterious structure known as the "Chappell vault". In the war room, Rick announces that they have received permits to drain and excavate the swamp. Marty is not happy about going back to the swamp but is outvoted by the rest of the team. A local tree expert is called in to examine the tree stump that was found earlier in the season in the swamp. His opinion is that the tree would not have grown in water and must have been above it at some stage. At the money pit site, drilling has reached 140 ft (43 m) and a core that is extracted contains wood and possibly concrete, leading to the belief that the Chappell vault may have been found. When he is presented with the core, Dan Blankenship agrees.
10	5	"The 90-Foot Stone"	December 2, 2014	2.46
When another core sample is found to be full of wood, the team decides that continuing may damage the Chappell vault. Daniel Ronnstam, an amateur cryptographer, visits the island to discuss his theory that the inscription on the 90-foot stone contains a second message that explains how to disable the flood tunnels. The team agrees that they need to find the 90-foot stone in order to verify Daniel's theory . The narrator explains that freemasons have been heavily involved in the various searches for the treasure. Charles Barkhouse announces that he is a mason and says that he will try to get access to archives in the Halifax Grand Lodge. There, a link to the Knights Templar is discussed and freemasonry links to the Oak Island treasure hunts are discovered. In the war room, a coin found earlier in the season is cleaned and what appears to be a Templar cross is revealed. At the swamp, Rick, Daniel Ronnstam and a metal detector expert investigate the "Mercy point". Almost immediately, Tony Sampson finds a line of rocks, similar to those found last season. The team decides to conduct a dye test in 10–X.
11	6	"Seven Must Dye"	December 9, 2014	2.90
Marty and Alex Lagina travel to France to see author Kathleen McGowan who claims that she can prove what the treasure is and its origin. She takes them to see the Château de Montségur where she claims the treasure was originally located before ultimately being moved to Oak Island. The next stop is Rennes-le-Château, where they meet a 21st century Knight Templar who believes the treasure is on the island. They then visit the church of Saint Mary Magdalene in the village. In Alet-les-Bains Alex and Marty are shown various points of interest. On Oak Island, dye and sea water are poured into 10–X with the hope that observers around the island, in the air and on the water will be able to see where any of the dye leaves the island, proving that the flood tunnel system exists. The test is unsuccessful.
12	7	"The Trail of the Templars"	December 16, 2014	2.47
While the swamp drains, the team travels to Saltcoats in Scotland where it is believed that the Templar treasure was brought after being removed from France. They then travel to Kilwinning Abbey where the treasure was allegedly kept for a time. After that they are taken to Rosslyn Chapel to be shown stone carvings of what appear to be corn and other vegetation that was unknown in Europe at the time the chapel was built. Later, at a local pub, author Alan Butler presents a theory that Oak Island is a copy of Solomon's Temple and the entrance to the money pit is 996 ft (303.6 m) to the west in the Oak Island swamp. Back on Oak Island, Jack Begley and Dan Blankenship visit a treeless area called "the bald spot" where Dan uses dowsing to find hidden tunnels. The area is excavated to a depth of 12 ft (4 m) but nothing is found.
13	8	"X Marks the Spot"	December 23, 2014	2.72
The team search the swamp with ground-penetrating radar (GPR), looking for anomalies. At the money pit, Marty has the precise location of their shaft determined and then looks for the point 996 ft (303.6 m) to the west in the swamp that was suggested by Alan Butler. Marty decides to designate the spot the Enochian chamber. Other members of the team decide to check out the "Mercy point". However, it is not drained so they must wait. The GPR locates anomalies at the Enochian chamber but nothing substantive is found. J. Hutton Pulitzer offers to help the team by sending two of his divers to the bottom of 10–X. A diving platform must be built around the shaft and the old, rusted ladder removed for safety reasons before the dive can happen.
14	9	"A Dangerous Dive"	January 6, 2015	2.59
The team removes the old, rusted ladder from borehole 10–X then, via video-conference, receive news from Craig Tester that the tree stump found earlier in the season has been carbon dated to between 1450 and 1640 AD while wood found in the core from the Chappell vault dates from 1665 to the 1900s. Craig suggests that this may mean that the island was used multiple times to hide treasure. J. Hutton Pulitzer and one of his divers meet with the team in the war room to discuss his dive plan, which includes mapping the shaft with sonar. This is done while the divers are preparing for the dive and reveals that there is 4 ft (1.2 m) of debris covering the 27 in (686 mm) diameter section of the shaft. The divers are eventually lowered into the shaft, albeit with some difficulty.
15	10	"The Big Reveal"	January 13, 2015	3.06
The divers start their descent but, when one of them becomes stuck temporarily, the dive is aborted. In the war room the decision is made to scan the bottom of 10–X with sonar before sending divers down again. The scan reveals what appears to be a chamber and possible man-made objects, prompting a second dive. However, due to safety concerns, Marty convinces other members of the team that the dive should be cancelled. Days later, the team is presented with a 3D rendering of the chamber which seems to confirm what Dan Blankenship believes he saw when he dived to the bottom in the 1970s.

=== Season 3 (2015–2016) ===
No. overall	No. in season	Title	Original release date	U.S. viewers (millions)
16	1	"The Hole Truth"	November 10, 2015	2.26
The team removes a corroded riser pipe from borehole 10–X to make the shaft safe for another dive. A high-definition camera is lowered into the shaft to map it and the subterranean chamber. That and subsequent sonar scans seem to confirm what Dan Blankenship believes he saw in 1971. In the war room, treasure hunters Robert and Bob Leonard present a map that they claim to have prepared from nuclear magnetic resonance imaging scans that show the island is hiding a web of tunnels and treasure. The Leonards, along with Charles Barkhouse and Jack Begley try to confirm their data using electrical resistivity and conductivity, with promising results.
17	2	"Pipe Down"	November 17, 2015	2.56
Various scans have indicated the possibility of man-made objects in the chamber at the bottom of 10–X so it is decided to remove rusted pipes and debris in the shaft in order to make it possible to safely dive to the chamber. While doing so, a 140 ft (43 m) section of riser pipe drops back into the shaft. A pump is inserted into nearby borehole 201–X to draw the water down and expose the lost riser. It and another riser are eventually removed. Elsewhere, team members search for treasure that was indicated on the map recently provided by the Leonards.
18	3	"Time to Dig"	November 24, 2015	2.60
The team goes shopping for excavation equipment. After returning to the island, they test a theory that was provided to them in the United States by researcher Robert Markus by digging at a certain point near Smiths Cove. A piece of wood and blue clay is found but nothing to confirm the theory. At the money pit, the team try to find the Hedden shaft.
19	4	"The Overton Stone"	December 1, 2015	3.05
Work continues to accurately locate the Hedden shaft. Later, the team travels to Overton, Nova Scotia to examine a stone mentioned by Robert Markus. There they meet Terry Deveau, a local historian, who guides them to the "Overton stone". He believes the carving on the stone could be 500-years-old, while local Miꞌkmaq people believe that association with Europeans dates back even further. The cross on the stone appears to be that of the Portuguese Knights of Christ rather than the Knights Templar from England and Scotland. At borehole 10–X, divers successfully remove debris from the shaft but an attempt to remove a 6 ft (1.8 m) section of 27 in (686 mm) casing fails meaning that the hole cannot be expanded to 32 in (813 mm) diameter.
20	5	"Disappearing Act"	December 8, 2015	3.22
Jack Begley, and Craig and Drake Tester start metal-detecting on lot 6 on the island, where ex-slave Samuel Ball once lived, eventually becoming one of the richest men in the area. After finding some metal artifacts they find what appear to be low stone walls. One of the stones is triangular in shape with a flat surface on one side which draws the attention of the three. Meanwhile, Marty and Rick fill in the hole made while searching for the Hedden shaft. Historian Terry Deveau is taken to see the triangular stone. He notes that a piece of the stone seems to have been added. A remotely operated underwater vehicle (ROV) is sent down borehole 10–X. On its way to the cavern it passes a lost, 20 ft (6.1 m) long drill bar. The ROV sees two apparent wooden posts but is unable to locate tunnels. Based on the ROV data, it is decided to postpone a dive into the pit.
21	6	"Carved in Stone"	December 15, 2015	2.47
With work on borehole 10–X temporarily suspended, rock carvings that have been found on the island over the years are investigated. The team searches for the remains of an engraved boulder found in 1921 that was destroyed with dynamite so that treasure hunters could dig underneath. They discover parts of the boulder concreted to the floor of the old Oak Island Museum. The current owner allows the team to return them to the island. Historian Terry Deveau examines the rocks and mysterious clues are found. At the money pit, a scanning sonar is dropped down borehole Valley–3 but it is unable to get a clear image. Author John O'Brien visits the island to discuss his theory that the Aztecs may have visited the island in the past. He takes the team to the south shore where he claims a mine was dug. At the bottom of the megalithic cross discovered by Fred Nolan, he tells the team that this is near where the Aztecs buried their treasure. Before testing this theory, the team have to enter into an agreement with Fred Nolan to access his land, which is where the Aztec treasure is allegedly buried.
22	7	"The Missing Peace"	December 22, 2015	3.40
A deal with Fred Nolan is struck and he becomes part of the Oak Island team. This gives the team access to almost all of the island. In the war room, Fred shares his detailed maps with the team and drilling is started at a site where he believes a cavern exists approximately 10 ft (3 m) underground. While drilling, there is an indication that the drill has struck metal at approximately 11 ft (3 m). Marty digs with the excavator but is unable to find metal, but a sharpened piece of wood is found. Author David MacDonald, who wrote the January 1965 Reader's Digest story that first attracted Dan Blankenship and Marty and Rick Lagina to Oak Island, visits Oak Island. Near to the Oak Island bicentennial memorial, the team buries a time capsule in which are contributions from each member of the team as well as from David MacDonald.
23	8	"Phantoms of the Deep"	December 29, 2015	3.30
In Michigan, Marty, Alex and Craig meet with side-scan sonar experts who believe there is a submerged wreck near Oak Island. On the island, drilling commences near Fred Nolan's house at the northern point of the swamp. At a depth of 106 ft (32 m), a 5 ft (1.5 m) deep void in the slate is encountered. Jack, Alex and Charles travel to the Bedford Institute of Oceanography to investigate claims that Fred Nolan had told the team about the south shore. Some anomalies are visible in underwater bathymetry. After their return to the island they conduct a side-scan sonar sweep of the waters surrounding Oak Island finding a triangular shaped stone on top of which is another triangle shape pointing to the money pit. On the island, Rick, Dan Henskee and Dave excavate the land between the south shore road and the swamp unsuccessfully searching for a wall that Fred Nolan claims to have found 30 years ago.
24	9	"Columbus Day"	January 5, 2016	2.79
Members of the team board Tony Sampson's boat in order to examine the triangular object by diving to it. A marine archeologist locates and examines the stone, confirming that it points due north. Marty, Alex and Tony Sampson dive on the rock but when Marty and Alex return to the boat, Tony Sampson continues to explore. He discovers another, larger triangular rock due north of the first approximately 66 ft (20 m) closer to shore. At 10–X, Rick and Dave drop a probe into the shaft, trying to locate the drill bar that was lost many years ago. They successfully locate the top of the drill bar at 204 ft (62.3 m). In the war room, the team hears a theory about Christopher Columbus visiting the island. Later, divers are sent down 10–X. Almost immediately, communications fail.
25	10	"Silence in the Dark"	January 12, 2016	3.11
Communication difficulties continue during the dive in 10–X. The dive is aborted and the safety diver is recovered but the other diver remains out of contact. Eventually he surfaces and the team and divers debrief in the war room. A second dive is later called off because of problems with the diver's mask. Four days later, another dive is made, with the lost drill bar being reached. Jack and Rick investigate the rocks that form Nolan's cross. At the boulder on the shore near Fred Nolan's house they find an old pulley buried. In the war room, Charles Barkhouse presents the team with a Roman sword that was allegedly found in the waters off Oak Island in the 1940s.
26	11	"Sword Play"	January 19, 2016	2.82
The team has the Roman sword examined by an expert and find that it is a modern reproduction. Chemist Christa Brosseau determines that it dates to the late 1800s. At Smiths Cove, team members search for eelgrass that was used, along with coconut fibre, to cover box drains discovered in the 1800s. The eelgrass that they find dates to 1470–1650. In the war room, team members discuss diving 10–X with diver John Chatterton via videoconference. Later they meet with relatives of treasure hunter Laverne Johnson, who believed the treasure was actually buried 200–300 ft (61–91 m) north of the money pit. While trying to locate the spot where Laverne Johnson believed the treasure was buried, Jack Begley discovers a rock with a large hole drilled in it. One of the core samples recovered in the area contains wood but none is found in a subsequent core.
27	12	"Voices from Below"	January 26, 2016	3.17
At the money pit, drilling starts at a point suggested by Charles Barkhouse. At 171 ft (52 m) the drill bit enters a void that continues down to 192 ft (59 m) in borehole C–1. In the spoils from the shaft, Jack Begley finds a small piece of metal. Relatives of Maynard Kaiser, who fell to his death in the money pit in 1897, visit the island. John Chatterton arrives on the island to dive 10–X. He successfully reaches the subterranean chamber.
28	13	"Secrets and Revelations"	February 2, 2016	3.41
The diving investigation of borehole 10–X concludes with nothing found. Joan, Jean and Joyce McGinnis, three sisters who are descendants of Daniel McGinnis, one of the boys who originally found the money pit, visit the island. They are given a tour of the island, including the foundations of the McGinnis home. They then tell the team that they boys found 3 treasure chests and each boy took one, before presenting the team with a small gold cross that they claim came from one of the chests. Later, a camera is sent down borehole C–1 and a shiny metallic object is seen in the void.

=== Season 4 (2016–2017) ===
No. overall	No. in season	Title	Original release date	U.S. viewers (millions)
29	1	"Going for Broke"	November 15, 2016	2.62
The team agrees on a plan for this season. Although John Chatterton said the cavern at the bottom of 10–X seemed to be natural, Dan Blankenship is resolute in his belief and presents man-made objects that he had retrieved from the shaft. At the money pit, old casings are removed to enable further drilling. Theorist Zena Halpern presents a handmade copy of what she claims is a French map from 1347 of Oak Island. The map shows locations for a "hatch", a "valve" and "anchors" on the island. A theory is presented based on a purported decoding of a cipher that Joab at the time of King David transported the Ark of the Covenant to North Africa from which it was later transported onward by the Knights Templar to Oak Island. Members of the team travel to New Ross, Nova Scotia to a home that is thought to be the site of a Templar castle. They are shown a stone that appears to have a Templar cross carved on it and an old well that they send a camera into. The team decides to try to locate the "hatch" shown on Zena Halpern's map.
30	2	"Always Forward"	November 22, 2016	2.66
The team locates a rectangular hole in the rock on Dave Blankenship's property that may be the "hatch". They decide to have it inspected by archeologist Laird Niven. Preparations are made for large scale drilling in the money pit at shafts C–1 and Valley–3 requiring significant rework of the ground around the money pit. Meanwhile, members of the team travel back to New Ross so that Tony Sampson can dive the well that they visited previously. He finds a triangle carved into one of the stones near the top of the well and then, while under water, locates an engraved broad arrow. While discussing matters in the war room, Rick notifies team members that Fred Nolan has died. Marty, Rick, Craig Tester and Dave Blankenship visit Dan Blankenship to inform him of Fred's death.
31	3	"Swamp Things"	November 29, 2016	2.97
Rick, Dave Blankenship and Charles Barkhouse return from Fred Nolan's funeral. While earthworks are being carried out at the money pit area, Rick and Charles discover timbers and pottery on the surface, likely from the Dunfield spoils. Charles discovers a piece of stone which appears to have an X with a hook, as used by the Templars, inscribed on it. A metal detection expert meets with the team in the war room to discuss further testing he had carried out in the swamp. Tony Sampson is asked to dive in the swamp at points of interest, one of which is where he previously found a stump that was later dated to between 1450 and 1640 AD. One of Fred Nolan's survey markers is found under the stump. At the other point, a long plank is found. A geologist examines the stone found earlier at the money pit and determines that the "X" is man-made. In the war room Craig tells the team that the plank has been carbon dated to between 1680 and 1735.
32	4	"No Stone Unturned"	December 6, 2016	2.95
Equipment starts arriving so that Irving Equipment can begin drilling in the money pit area. Part of the team unsuccessfully attempts to track down the "90-foot stone" in nearby Halifax at the building where it was displayed in the early 1900s. After finding nothing in that building, The Halifax Club is inspected after a rumour that the stone was embedded in the floor is presented. At Smith's Cove the ground is scanned with ground-penetrating radar (GPR) with the aim of locating box drains first discovered in 1850. Lee Lamb returns to the island with her children. She brings the "1704 stone" discovered by her father below the surface of the beach in Smith's Cove in the 1960s. When Irving Equipment is ready to start drilling in the money pit, the Oak Island team insist that Dan Blankenship starts the process.
33	5	"Bullseye"	December 11, 2016	2.82
Using a device known as a "casing oscillator" a 40 in (101.6 cm) diameter caisson is driven into the ground at the site of the Valley–3 borehole. Spoils are then carefully checked for artifacts and debris. At a local resort, members of the team meet with author Randall Sullivan who is researching a book he is writing called "The Curse of Oak Island". He is invited to visit the island where he first sees the money pit and then discusses the possibility of Inca treasure being on the island with Dan Blankenship. Members of the team return to "the hatch" to investigate further. At the money pit, the caisson reaches the depth where a wooden structure was found two years ago and wood is brought up in the spoils.
34	6	"Circles in Wood"	December 20, 2016	3.44
Attempts to use an air lift to recover items from the Chappell vault are unsuccessful. When the hammer-grab is used pieces of wood are recovered, one of which is the same piece from which a core sample was retrieved two years earlier. Another hammer-grab pulls up large pieces of wood that have been cut with a circular saw, indicating the wood is not ancient. When presented to Dan Blankenship, he believes the wood is from Chappell's shaft, not the vault. The team decides to drill in borehole C–1. Alex Lagina, Jack Begley and metal detection expert Gary Drayton start metal detecting on Lot 6, where Samuel Ball once lived. They unearth a large section of chain, a copper ring and a coin.
35	7	"All That Glitters"	December 27, 2016	3.68
While drilling at the C-1 borehole continues, the swamp is drained and then searched with a metal detector. When they are unable to locate targets, the team decides to rescan the swamp with a better metal detector. Gary Drayton is called in to search and finds a decking spike. Charles Barkhouse and Randall Sullivan travel to Lunenburg to conduct genealogical research into people who have lived on Oak Island. They view an official 1883 map that has "Kidd's Treasure" written on Oak Island and find a book that details the deathbed confession of an old sailor who said he helped bury Captain Kidd's treasure on an island. At the money pit, drilling reaches the target depth of 170 ft (52 m) where a previously inserted camera may have seen something shiny and gold coloured.
36	8	"The Mystery of Samuel Ball"	January 3, 2017	3.43
A camera is sent down borehole C-1 but the shiny, gold coloured object is not seen. Hammer grabs are taken and bring up wood. The team decides to further explore the void with sonar and John Chatterton agrees to make a dive in the shaft. Charles Barkhouse and Gary Drayton metal detect Lot 24, one of the lots previously owned by Samuel Ball, a former slave turned cabbage farmer who mysteriously became one of the richest men in the area. They find a button, British coins from the 1700s, a metal tag with a name on it, and a lead ingot used for making musket balls. In the war room, Randall Sullivan indicates that his research has led him to believe that Francis Bacon buried the treasure and wanted it to be found by someone else.
37	9	"Echoes from the Deep"	January 10, 2017	3.35
A scanning sonar device is sent down 10–X and verifies the results of John Chatterton's dive. Some of the team are in denial and insist there is still some point in exploring 10–X further on the basis that as Dan Blankenship spent so much time on it, it must be the key to the alleged puzzle. A different device is sent down the 43 in (109.2 cm) diameter C–1 shaft and indicates the void is approximately 10 ft (3 m) square and 7 ft (2 m) high. John Chatterton is lowered into the shaft and examines the void, confirming there appears to be a tunnel leading from the void. Diver Mike Huntley is sent down to conduct metal detecting and further exploration and finds a metallic object.
38	10	"About Face"	January 17, 2017	3.04
In the void at the bottom of borehole C–1, diver Mike Huntley reports multiple hits on the metal detector before he has to return to the surface. John Chatterton makes another dive and while he gets some hits, he is unable to locate the metallic objects. Historian Terry Deveau shows Charles Barkhouse and Rick to Peggy's Cove to show them a boulder that has been reworked to resemble a face that looks toward Oak Island. The team decides to do a new examination of borehole 10–X and drill another shaft in the money pit area.
39	11	"Presidential Secrets"	January 24, 2017	3.20
After an airlift is used in 10–X the spoils are thoroughly checked for artifacts. Several things are found, including old wood and a bone. A temporary cofferdam, made from inflatable bladders, is laid out in Smiths Cove. However, before it is complete, one of the bladders ruptures and a new one must be procured. Rick and Alex Lagina head to the Franklin D. Roosevelt Presidential Library and Museum to meet researcher Paul Troutman and learn why the late President was interested in Oak Island.
40	12	"Hyde Park & Seek"	January 31, 2017	3.15
At the Franklin D. Roosevelt Presidential Library, it is revealed that Roosevelt believed that the lost jewels of Marie Antoinette are buried on Oak Island. Rick Lagina and researcher Doug Cowell meet with Zena Halpern to discuss the theory that she presented earlier in the season. A new cofferdam is laid out at Smith's Cove and the beach is excavated. Pieces of blackened wood are discovered under the beach, shortly followed by a structure. At Dan Blankenship's home them team examine Dan's records with a view to determining the location of a new hole at the money pit. There is some disagreement as to the location so the team allows Craig Tester to determine the location of borehole T–1.
41	13	"One Of Seven"	February 7, 2017	3.24
Members of the team speak to a professor of computer sciences at the University of Southern California who has been trying to decrypt the "Le formule" cypher given to them by Zena Halpern. They have determined that the cipher was meant to be decrypted into French and have made an initial translation which is incomplete because they only have 1/7th of the cipher. At Smiths Cove, stones that look stacked by size are found. Dan Blankenship believes it looks like a French drain. Further digging indicates that drain continues under the cofferdam and the permit time is running out so it is decided to end digging for this year. In the war room, treasure hunter Gary Clayton, who owns nearby Little Mash Island claims that his island is connected underwater to Oak Island. He believes there are artifacts, including several hundred tons of gold, in chambers underneath his island although he provides no proof. He offers to be a consultant to the team for a year, taking 15% of anything they find. In the money pit area, wood starts being found in T–1 at 102 ft (31 m). Some of the timbers are very large.
42	14	"Sticks and Stones"	February 14, 2017	3.20
An oak wedge that doesn't look like any of the other wood that has been recovered is taken from T–1 and shown to Dan Blankenship. Samples of the wood from T–1 are dated from 1670 to 1780 and 1655 to 1695. Stonemasons examine the central stone of Nolan's Cross and then the stone at the base of the cross, which appears to have worked somehow. Digging in T–1 ends with no more wood found. Rick, Marty and Craig decide to dig another hole which the brothers name GAL–1 after their parents, George and Anne Lagina.
43	15	"Blood is Thicker"	February 21, 2017	3.79
Much wood is recovered from GAL–1 including some coated in resin. Sheets of metal are recovered from 154 ft (47 m). A solid corner plate, large washer, and hex nut are recovered from 160 ft (49 m). The caisson is now stuck so digging at GAL–1 is suspended. From the spoils, Gary Drayton recovers a sailcloth needle, a button, and a piece of metal with a square hole in it. Joan and Jean McGinnis return to the island with some of the ashes of their sister Joyce so that they can inter them in the foundations of the home built by Daniel McGinnis. They also bring the gold cross that they previously showed the team to be examined by expert Dr. Lori Verderame who believes the cross was cast in the Spanish West Indies between 1550 and 1700. Other artifacts are appraised including an iron spike. She determines that the spike was used as a finishing nail for a Spanish galleon and dates to between 1575 and 1600. The British military button found in the spoils dates to between 1575 and 1812. The corner plate is a type used in the construction of treasure chests and dates to a similar period. Note: This episode aired as a two-hour special.
44	16	"Drilling Down. A Look Ahead."	February 28, 2017	1.72
The season is recapped and the team is interviewed at the end of season. The wood from borehole 10–X is carbon dated as being from 1670–1780. A new cipher is decoded leading the team to once again believe that there is a "hatch" somewhere on the island. The team wants to continue searching the swamp, proposes pumping borehole 10–X dry to enable yet another round of searches, and wants to search more of the island with metal detectors in the future. Note: This is a special episode.

=== Season 5 (2017–2018) ===
No. overall	No. in season	Title	Original release date	U.S. viewers (millions)
45	1	"Forever Family"	November 7, 2017	2.95
Severe winter storms have wrought havoc on the island, with trees knocked down and the south shore road destroyed. The road is rebuilt. It is revealed that Craig's son, Drake, has died. Gary Drayton and Peter Fornetti begin metal-detecting at Isaac's Point on the eastern end of the island. A metal axe blade and an old coin are found. A camera is sent down borehole C–1. Objects that may be man-made are seen. The video is examined prior to sending a diver down the shaft. Mike Huntley descends into the chamber but is unable to locate the items previously seem. He brings samples of the mud but nothing is found. On Lot 18, spoils from GAL–1 are examined. A pre-1780 rosehead nail is found. The episode ends with a memorial to Drake Tester. Note: This is a two-hour episode.
46	2	"Dead Man's Chest"	November 14, 2017	2.98
Drilling of multiple holes, a system called "Geotech", begins at the money pit, based on a grid laid out by Rick. While drilling in one of the holes, salt water starts erupting from borehole C–1. The team travels to Saint Mary's University in Halifax to have the spike found in the GAL–1 spoils examined under a Scanning electron microscope. Based on the lack of manganese and sulphur in the spike, it is consistent with being older than the 1800s. Historian Doug Crowell has been researching the ownership of Lot 26 before Samuel Ball purchased it and found it was owned by privateer James Anderson. The team meets with one of his descendants who allows them to examine Anderson's sea chest. Inside they discover proof that Anderson was a freemason. Gary Drayton, Jack Begley and Peter Fornetti start metal detecting on Isaac's Point. A musket ball and a cut maravedí are found.
47	3	"Obstruction"	November 21, 2017	2.85
Drilling in the money pit continues. In one of the shafts, several chunks of metal are brought up from 162 ft (49 m). Nearby, on Lot 16, the team metal detect the Dunfield spoils pile, finding 17th century coins. A letter arrives from the Department Of Communities, Culture And Heritage that has the potential to significantly curtail exploration on the island. As a compromise, the government requests that an archeologist be on-site on Oak Island as an adviser to the treasure hunters. Archaeologist Laird Niven joins the Oak Island team. The team starts metal detecting on Lot 24 where artifacts were found previously. The bowl of a spoon, a chunk of metal, rocks that may be part of a foundation, and part of a pewter spoon are found. Based on the rocks and the spoon pieces, Marty Lagina concludes that "Something definitely happened at this spot right here."
48	4	"Close Call"	November 28, 2017	3.36
Drilling below bedrock at 169 ft (52 m), the team discovers a void in the rock, and then another at 179 ft (55 m), reminiscent of the experience of Robert Restall, who believed he had drilled into a spiral tunnel. A sudden explosion, caused by a high pressure hose blowing out of its coupling, injures the left wrist and right knee of Max Williamson, one of the drilling crew. Paramedics arrive and transport the injured worker to hospital. Drilling is halted for over a week. Rick Lagina and Charles Barkhouse review their Geotech plan. On Isaac's Point, a toy gun is found. Rick suggests it was probably Rick Restall's toy and then announces that Lee Lamb wishes to return to the island. Lee arrives with her brother, Rick Restall, who has only been to the island once since his father and brother's death. He confirms that the toy gun is his. Drilling at the money pit area resumes soon after.
49	5	"Bone Dry"	December 5, 2017	3.16
John Wonnacot, who developed the Geotech system, meets with the team at the money pit to discuss the drilling plan. At the Beaton Institute near Sydney, Nova Scotia, Alex Lagina, Charles Barkhouse, Peter Fornetti and Doug Crowell are researching documents donated by M.R. Chappell, son of William Chappell. They find a sworn affidavit by Frederick Blair confirming that there was "unmistakeable evidence of [the drill bit] having gone through or into gold". They also find that the bottom of the Chappell shaft was 10–12 ft (3–4 m) north of the top, which will affect the Geotech plan. The first of the new holes to be drilled is designated H–8. A piece of bone is recovered from 160–165 ft (49–50 m) while pieces of pottery are found at 190–195 ft (58–59 m). Laird Niven's estimation is that the pottery is from the 18th century. Marty, Dave, and Gary start metal detecting on the boulderless beach. An 18th-century iron spike is found.
50	6	"Remains of the Day"	December 12, 2017	3.01
While examining the H–8 spoils, Jack Begley finds another piece of pottery and a mystery piece. Rick, Marty and Craig drive to Saint Mary's University to have Dr Christa Brosseau test what has been recovered from H–8. Examination under a scanning electron microscope shows the mystery item to be bone. Meanwhile, Jack Begley and Dan Henskee discover a piece of leather and what appears to be a piece of parchment. At the money pit, geophysicist Mike West begins a scan of the recently drilled shafts trying to identify anomalies. However, Rick Lagina is missing. Marty finds that Rick has a rash and has had a headache for four days. He is diagnosed as having lyme disease and has to rest. Back at the money pit, H-8 is scanned and an anomaly is detected around 160 ft (49 m). After returning to the island, Rick informs the team that the bone fragments are human and from two different individuals. It is decided to have the bone fragments carbon dated.
51	7	"The Lot Thickens"	December 19, 2017	3.13
Irving Equipment representatives return to the island to plan a large scale dig at H–8. On Lot 26, a rectangular depression is found. It is later excavated but nothing is found. The parchment found earlier is analysed and the initial assumption that it was parchment is confirmed to be correct. The leather that was found at the same time is scanned and appears to be part of a book binding. Further testing has been carried out on the pieces of bone found earlier. One is from a person who originated in Europe while the other is from the Middle East. Equipment starts to arrive in preparation for expanding H–8.
52	8	"Dan's Breakthrough"	January 2, 2018	3.31
The bone fragments found earlier have been carbon dated, the Middle Eastern bone to between 1682 and 1736 and the European bone to between 1678 and 1764. Doug Crowell notes that Zena Halpern's map mentions the French family name "La Rochefoucauld", a notable French noble family and asks for help researching further. Alex, Peter and Charles travel to the Centre of Geographic Sciences to help him. While researching, Doug claims that Samuel de Champlain, a noted cartographer, appears to have left Mahone Bay, where Oak Island and more than 360 other islands are located, off his map for unknown reasons. De Champlain worked for Pierre Dugua, Sieur de Mons who was related to the La Rochefoucauld family and it is theorized that de Champlain was directed to leave Mahone Bay off the map. The team decides to send members to France for further investigation of the theory. While metal detecting on Lot 16, Rick, Marty, Dave and Gary discover part of a small horseshoe, several depressions in the ground, a piece of grapeshot and a coin. Irving Equipment starts putting a 50 in (127 cm) caisson down into borehole H–8 using a custom-built oscillator.
53	9	"The French Connection"	January 9, 2018	3.02
Team members travel to France and meet Sonia Matossian, a member of the Rochefoucauld family, at the Château de La Rochefoucauld. Although unable to positively establish a link between the family and the Templars, it is found that the English translations on Zena Halpern's map are incorrect. They then examine the rock on which the castle is built. After leaving the castle they travel to Domme to visit the prison where the Knights Templar were held. There they observe a carving they claim is similar to an upside-down version of the Rochefoucauld family coat of arms. Another carving appears similar to the "Tree of Life". Their guide shows them graffiti crosses that are similar to the cross on the H+O stone, which was part of the inscribed boulder found in 1921. On the island, the team begin an examination of the Lot 24 "foundation" under the guidance of Laird Niven. A piece of pottery is found but it is determined the foundation is too small to be part of a house. After team members have returned from France, they discuss what they had found in a war room meeting.
54	10	"The Signs Of A Cross"	January 16, 2018	3.34
Wood from what the team assumes is the Chappell shaft continues to be extracted from the excavation of H–8 while no dirt is recovered. A spike, pottery, glass and another piece of bone are recovered from the shaft before an obstruction is encountered at 170 ft (52 m). The team meets in the war room to discuss how to proceed. In the war room, Doug Crowell presents what he believes is a transcript of an incomplete log of an unnamed ship from the Duc d'Anville Nova Scotia expedition of 1746. The Duc d'Anville's was a member of the Rochefoucauld family. The story in the log fits very well with the Oak Island mystery. At Smith's Cove, Rick and Gary metal detect on the beach. They find a small lead cross with a square hole in it. Rick claims that the shape is similar to a carving that he saw at Domme Prison in France. Gary believes it dates from 1200 to 1600.
55	11	"Moving Targets"	January 23, 2018	3.32
The team assembles in the war room where they show the lead cross to Laird Niven. The large caisson in H–8 is replaced by a smaller 50 in (127 cm) caisson. At 150 ft (46 m), more pottery, leather, and a piece of bone are found. The team theorize that whatever previously obstructed the borehole at 170 ft (52 m) has now been pushed down and out of the way by the caisson. At Smith's Cove, Rick and Gary continue metal detecting. They find a lead spoon handle and a piece of brass. In the war room, geophysicist Mike West presents the results of the scan he did earlier. They indicate a significant anomaly around H–8 at 170 ft (52 m). Craig announces that he will be leaving and not coming back this year. After more discussion the team decides to drill another hole, called DMT after Drake Tester.
56	12	"A Key to the Mystery"	January 30, 2018	3.25
In the war room, the team talk to the expert who helped the team at Domme prison and he believes the lead cross might date to the 13th century. Rick and Charles travel to meet Tom Nolan, Fred's son. He gives them access to Fred Nolan's survey maps of the island although they have difficulty interpreting them. He also gives them a folding, metal skeleton key. Searching for a local dumpsite, the team digs a trench on Lot 12 near the former house of Fred Nolan. Several pottery fragments are found in the trench. Alex and Jack meet a bookbinding expert. He verifies the parchment and leather found in H–8. Rick and Gary visit Dan Blankenship to show him the lead cross. Drilling of shaft DMT begins in the money pit area.
57	13	"Unhinged"	February 6, 2018	3.32
The team sends a photo of the lead cross to Zena Halpern who claims it is not a cross, but the symbol of the Phoenician goddess Tanit and dates to 1200 BC. She further makes the unsupported claim that the Knights Templar worshipped Tanit. The team drain the northern part of the swamp near Fred Nolan's house. Rick finds an axe-cut wooden stake similar to those found by Fred Nolan. At the old dumpsite, Gary and Charles each find a decorative metal hinge while Jack finds pottery. As borehole DMT reaches 77 ft (924 in) an O-ring on the oscillator fails and hydraulic fluid leaks out. While the oscillator is being repaired, the hammer grab tool is obstructed. Removing the obstruction proves difficult. Gary finds teeth from the drilling caisson in the spoils. At least 12 of the 36 teeth are found.
58	14	"Steel Trapped"	February 20, 2018	2.99
Author Kathleen McGowan Coppens visits the island and is shown the lead cross in the war room. She presents a theory that Templars would smuggle gold by covering it in lead and wearing it as a necklace. She believes that lead cross may have been the central piece in one of these necklaces. She also notes that Sarlat-la-Canéda in France is next to Domme, where the Templars were held. On Lot 8, Marty, Rick and Gary find a decorative keyhole plate. Water is removed from borehole DMT and a camera is then sent down. The exposed surface of the drilling obstruction at the money pit appears to be rocks and clay soil. Before further examination can be made, the borehole suddenly fills with water. The team considers sending a diver into the borehole.
59	15	"Seeing Red"	February 27, 2018	3.02
The team arranges for diver Mike Huntley to dive borehole DMT. Smith's Cove is excavated in the area where the cross was found. Axe-cut wood is found well below the surface and sent for testing. Team members visit the family of Harold Bishop, who was a crane operator for Robert Dunfield in 1965. The family presents a large piece of wood found by Bishop in the money pit. John Wonnacot joins team members in the war room where Marty and Craig inform them that the wood from Smith's Cove was dated to between 1684 and 1732 while the wood found by Harold Bishop was dated to between 1646 and 1690. The team plans a larger excavation at Smith's Cove. Rick and Gary start metal detecting on Lot 9, where they found the decorative keyhole plate. They find a button that Gary believes is from the late 1700s. A brooch that contains what looks like a ruby is also found.
60	16	"Amazing Discoveries"	March 6, 2018	2.89
The stone in the brooch is determined to be a 400–500 year old rhodolite garnet in a silver setting, determined by a gemologist and based on the cut of the stone. Mike Huntley arrives to dive borehole DMT. Flocculant that was poured into the shaft to improve visibility has not worked and has created a buoyant gel at the bottom that stops Mike from reaching the bottom. After adding dive weights, he discovers that the caisson is sitting on a very hard surface that appears to be a steel plate. Another diver is sent down and he finds that the obstruction is granite. Drilling is ended for this season. In the war room, the year's finds have been laid out on the table where they are discussed by the team.

=== Season 6 (2018–2019) ===
No. overall	No. in season	Title	Original release date	U.S. viewers (millions)
61	1	"Rick's Big Bang Theory"	November 13, 2018	2.92
A new war room has been built. The team plans to build a large coffer dam in Smith's Cove and to conduct seismic testing at the money pit. Eagle Canada, a seismic testing company, carries out a test run and successfully identifies the Halifax tunnel. They subsequently make a larger run covering the whole money pit area. An iron spike and some lead sheet are found at Smith's Cove. Laser ablation testing is conducted on the lead cross and it is determined that the cross is not from North America. A copper cartwheel twopence coin is found next to a moss-covered boulder Lot 2. A stone with holes drilled into it and an embedded iron spike is found. Further examination reveals more holes and an engraved triangle. At Smith's Cove, geophysicist Mike West conducts a deep, up to 20 ft (6 m), scan of the area. Rick, Craig and Dave travel to Irving Equipment's headquarters where an augmented reality demonstration shows them how the coffer dam will be constructed. On Lot 21, where Daniel McGinnis built a home, Rick and Gary find an old hinge and a jewelled brooch. Note: This is a two-hour episode.
62	2	"Gold Rush"	November 20, 2018	2.91
Rick and Gary show Marty and Dan the brooch that they found before having it checked by Laird Niven. Marty, Rick and Dave take both brooches to a gemologist. He confirms that the gem in the brooch found last season is a garnet while the "gem" in the recently found brooch is leaded glass. However, its setting is made using a technique that dates the brooch back to the 14th century and when imaged by a scanning electron microscope, gold is identified. Eagle Canada finishes its seismic scan of the money pit. Irving Equipment arrives to prepare for construction of the Smith's Cove coffer dam.
63	3	"Depth Perception"	November 27, 2018	3.41
Construction of the Smith's Cove coffer dam begins. Marty, Rick, Craig, Dave and Charles travel to the headquarters of Eagle Canada in Calgary to receive results of the seismic scan, which reveal the existence of a mysterious underground chamber and other anomalies. On Lot 26, Gary, Jack and Mike West start metal detecting on the beach. They find an old, square metal spike, a hook and the remains of a crossbow bolt. Choice Drilling arrives on the island to commence taking cores using sonic drilling. The first drilling location is designated DE6. Wood is recovered from 83 ft (25 m).
64	4	"A Legacy Revealed"	December 4, 2018	3.30
In the war room the team examine the crossbow bolt. Later, an antiquities expert claims that the bolt is actually from a Roman pilum. Drilling of borehole DE6 continues until something hard stops the drill at 203 ft (62 m). Drilling is moved to another location. A single thread of what looks to be coconut fibre is recovered from 160 ft (49 m). Ten feet down from that, axe-cut wood is recovered. Marty, Craig and Alex travel to Saint Mary's University to have the crossbow bolt examined by Dr Brosseau. In the war room, Rick lets everyone know that Zena Halpern has died. Rick and Peter travel to New York to collect all of her research, which she has bequeathed to Rick.
65	5	"Homecoming"	December 11, 2018	3.22
Drilling is moved to another site and wood is found at approximately 118 ft (36 m). In the war room, Rick discusses Zena's research and proposes that a research centre be established. Irving Equipment has arranged for the temporary donation of a prefabricated homes as a research centre. Zena Halpern's son, Davin, visits the island to see the centre and brings a gift. Jack, Peter and Gary return to Lot 21, where a brooch was recently found. Part of a cap badge is found, shortly before the other part is found. Coring continues at a different site in the money pit. At 118 ft (36 m), wood that may be from the shaft 6 tunnel is recovered.
66	6	"Precious Metal"	December 18, 2018	3.16
The team speaks with Tobias Skowronek, a geochemist at the German Mining Museum, who tells them that if they can send him the isotope data for the lead cross, he may be able to determine where and when the lead was mined. Comparing the isotope data to his database he determines that the lead was mined in southern France prior to the 1500s from deposits near Rennes-le-Château, where Marty and Alex had previously visited. Choice Drilling starts coring northeast of the money pit in an area called the "mega-bin". At 99.5 ft (30 m) the drill hits bedrock. Rick and the team take Dan Blankenship to Smith's Cove to show him the coffer dam. In the war room, the team meets with Judi Rudebusch, who worked with Zena Halpern for 10 years before her death. She introduces them to Gretchen Cornwall and John Temple, Temple being a hereditary descendant of Templars. Gretchen explains their theory that the money pit is of Templar origin and that Nolan's Cross is a Templar signpost and mathematically identifies the location of the treasure.
67	7	"Rock Solid"	January 1, 2019	3.01
The team decides to go back to Halifax to conduct a further search for the 90-foot stone. They find a similar size stone and return it to Oak Island. A second-hand wash plant is purchased so that the team can more easily sort spoils from the Smith's Cove excavation. Gary, Alex and Peter start metal detecting on Lot 24, which has now been cleared. They find a musket ramrod, pieces of bone and pottery, and a latch. Laird Niven is called in to conduct an archaeological excavation of the area and finds evidence of a man-made structure. Rick and Craig inspect the coffer dam and find several leaks so repairs are implemented. Mike Jardine from Irving Equipment examines the site and notices that there is a large amount of water coming from the beach. Engineer, astrophysicist and scientist Travis Taylor helps the team by compiling all of the data that they have. He explains how it may be possible to identify voids underneath the island using Radon testing. He further explains his theory of what happened on the island using archeo-astronomy. Examination of the island demonstrates some credibility to his theory. Excavation work begins in Smith's Cove. Note: This is a special, two-hour episode.
68	8	"Unearthed"	January 8, 2019	3.27
Pottery is found in the Smith's Cove spoils while the team attempts to find the U-shaped structure that was unearthed by Dan Blankenship in 1971. They find a hand-forged iron spike and what appears to be a gold coin. Later, a wooden structure with Roman numerals engraved into it is uncovered. Laird and other members of the team discuss how to bring out the inscription of the "90-foot stone" that was recovered from a basement in Halifax. A 3D LIDAR scan of the stone is conducted. The archeological examination at Lot 24 begins. Laird finds pottery and a clay pipe stem. Marty theorizes that it may be the work of Samuel Ball, who previously owned the lot. At the money pit, a core taken from 118 ft (36 m) contains wood, indicating that the shaft 6 tunnel has been found.
69	9	"As Above, So Below"	January 15, 2019	3.52
Excavation of the U-shaped structure in Smith's Cove continues. It appears to have been intentionally waterproofed with packed blue clay. Jack theorizes that it may have been a form of coffer dam. The 3D LIDAR scan of the "90-foot stone" has identified "LN" engraved on the stone. Rotated 180 degrees the "N" becomes an "A". Gary, Jack and Tony Sampson visit nearby Apple Island to further test Travis Taylor's theory finding three large boulders. While metal detecting on the uninhabited island, they find potential ferrous and non-ferrous targets. At the money pit, wood that may be from shaft 6 is recovered from 118 ft (36 m). In Smith's Cove, a wooden wall is uncovered.
70	10	"Fingers Made of Stone"	January 22, 2019	3.63
Team members travel to the Lordly House in Chester to examine the collection of Oak Island documents kept there. They find a description of the finger drains from 1863. At the money pit, Tory Martin, a gyro survey expert, starts determining how straight the boreholes are so the team can get accurate locations for artifacts they have recovered. In Smith's Cove, what may be one of the finger drains, is unearthed. While Laird is excavating the finger drain, Charles discovers a large amount of coconut fibre. During subsequent investigation, another structure is found. Rocks in the area all seem to be of roughly the same size, which the team thinks is unusual. Tory Martin finds a carved stone near the money pit. The stone is taken to the research centre and 3D LIDAR scanned.
71	11	"Wharfs and All"	January 29, 2019	3.56
Excavation of the latest structure at Smith's Cove continues, with the belief that it may be the L-shaped structure found by Dan Blankenship. Gary finds a lead bracelet near where he found the lead cross. Another structure that may be a slipway that Gilbert Hedden found is uncovered. In the war room, the team examines the stone found by Tory Martin. They theorize that the carvings may be a runic inscription, left by Vikings. Still looking for the shaft 6 tunnel, the team decides to resume the treasure hunt in H–8. ROC Equipment, who had previously worked with Irving Equipment, returns to the island with CEO Vanessa Lucido overseeing operations. Irving Equipment is also present. Alex Lagina and Paul Troutman travel to Yarmouth County Museum to view an alleged Viking stone found in the area.
72	12	"Slipway When Wet"	February 5, 2019	3.12
Debris continues to be removed from the H–8 shaft, which Marty believes is in the money pit. The caisson is lifted to 170 ft (52 m) and a submersible ROV is deployed to examine the area under the caisson. A right-angle corner is seen on the sonar returns. Video, sonar and comms is lost so the ROV is recovered. When it is found to be flooded, operations are suspended. As work continues to excavate the slipway in Smith's Cove, Gary finds a wrought iron object. In the war room, the team talks with Runology expert Lilla Kopar about the recently discovered stone. Later, she reports that the inscription is not runic but she did consider that the inscription may be a Gothic script. However, her final opinion is that is a decorative architectural piece. Returning to the site where the stone was found, Gary finds an old coin. Rick receives a call from Laird informing him that an undocumented concrete structure has been found.
73	13	"The Paper Chase"	February 12, 2019	3.70
While excavating the concrete wall in Smith's Cove, Laird exposes two plugged rubber pipes. Rick and Dave visit Dan Blankenship but he can shed no light on the concrete wall. At the money pit, the hammer grab starts recovering wood from below 170 ft (52 m). Jack finds what looks like parchment as well as some paper in the spoils. In the research centre, the parchment and paper are checked under a microscope. Dan Henskee finds what is possibly a piece of bone. Randall Sullivan returns to the island. He gives Marty and Rick each a signed copy of his new book and confirms that he still believes in the Francis Bacon theory.
74	14	"Voyage to the Bottom of the Cenote"	February 26, 2019	3.31
Craig and Jack meet with staff from the Centre of Geographic Sciences (COGS) to scan the waters around Oak Island looking for the possibility that there are additional flood tunnels to the south of the island. A peculiar rock formation is identified, along with some other formations. In the war room, items recovered from H–8 are laid out on the table. Via videoconference, Christa Brosseau explains that what was believed to be bone is actually slag, the "leather" is plant material, and the parchment is rag paper. Pottery, leather and a square nail are found in the spoils from the H–8 shaft. At the Nova Scotia School of Art and Design, bookbinding expert Joe Landry examines the paper and parchment recovered from H–8. Both appear to be from the 18th century. Later, Marty Lagina and Doug Crowell neet with Joe Landry at Saint Mary's University to examine the materials under a microscope. The pigments used indicate that the document may be of medieval origin. At the H–8 site, the caisson suddenly drops as the ground starts caving in. Oscillation is stopped. Later that night, the cave-in starts expanding. All work is suspended pending an engineer's assessment.
75	15	"Dye Harder"	March 5, 2019	3.51
Irving and ROC staff determine how to proceed after the collapse around H–8. They decide to use a vibro-hammer to shake the earth around the H–8 caisson, stabilizing the ground. At Smith's Cove the team searches for remains of the box drains, but only find an old metal bucket. The team decides to re-run the dye test carried out previously. This time, the dye will be introduced into borehole C–1, with members of the team stationed on the shore and in Tony Sampson's boat to watch. Aiding them, three drones will be launched. After a false start, caused by a twisted hose, dye starts flowing down C–1. Dan Blankenship arrives to view the process. In Smith's Cove, Gary observes an increasing flow of rust coloured in an area that was previously dry. Samples of the water are taken to the research centre for analysis, which proves positive. Team members travel to the COGS to find out the results of the recent scan. Two possible vents have been found, along with a number of points of interest.
76	16	"Detour"	March 12, 2019	3.46
The team determines that they need to dig under the crane pad that was built to construct the coffer dam. Meanwhile, Gary finds another iron object in Smith's Cove. In the money pit area, repairs to the ground around H–8 are completed but drilling has to stop because the shaft is now considered unstable. The team decides to concentrate on shaft 6. In the war room, the team shows Tony Sampson some underwater anomalies identified by the recent COGS scan and discusses diving on them. Tony and Alex dive on the anomalies while Jack stays on the boat as a safety diver. The first anomaly is found and determined to be pointing toward the money pit. The second anomaly is identified to be just two rocks, not an anchor. In the research centre, team members consult surveyor Steve Guptil about finding shaft 6. Back at Smith's Cove, Laird has completed uncovering the slipway, while Gary finds a large hinge piece. It and other artifacts are taken to New Ross to be appraised by blacksmith Carmen Legge. He assesses to hinge to have been made before 1800 and after the early 1600s while other items are crib spikes.
77	17	"Clue or False?"	March 19, 2019	3.64
The team intends to document, disassemble and remove the slipway so they can dig underneath. After some of the logs have been removed, Gary finds something iron underneath. He also finds an old coin. In the war room, Steve Guptil shows the team the results of his work compiling all of the digging data and where shaft 6 is most likely to be. At the money pit, drilling of shaft S–6 begins. Wood brought up from around 100 ft (30 m) is consistent with the shaft 6 tunnel. A large piece of leather, a piece of chain link and a bone are found in the spoils. At 110 ft (34 m) large oak timbers are found. Mike West returns to Smith's Cove and his scans identify several targets.
78	18	"Heavy Metal"	March 26, 2019	3.50
Billy gives Rick items that have been recovered from the S–6 spoils. They include pottery and a pipe stem and are later shown to Laird who says that most of the items date from the 1800s but one piece of pottery could be from the early 1700s. Eventually, S–6 reaches bedrock and drilling is stopped. A new shaft is chosen, but Rick chooses to allow Vanessa Lucido to name the new hole which she does, after her daughter Grace. The hole is named GG–1. Billy starts deconstructing the crane pad at Smith's Cove. Gary and Jack start metal detecting on Lot 21. They find a decorated piece of lead that is sent for analysis. Tobias Skowronek tells the team that the isotope data is identical to the cross found by Gary and is therefore pre-fifteenth century.
79	19	"Striking Distance"	April 2, 2019	3.34
Very old oak timbers are recovered from about 100 ft (30 m) down borehole GG–1. At 159 ft (48 m) with nothing substantial being recovered from the shaft, the team shuts down drilling. Gary and Jack start metal detecting on Lot 25. They find a lock plate from a box. In the war room, theorist Richard Moats, who had worked with Zena Halpern, explains his theory that Nolan's Cross was constructed by the Knights Templar and that it is part of a treasure map that points to the money pit. A new borehole is started at a site identified by Richard Moats. Hand cut timbers are recovered from the borehole, which has been designated site 3. In the spoils, pottery and purple wood are found. Next day, the team arrives at the money pit to find no activity due to the crane operators being on strike. At Smith's Cove, Billy finds water flowing out from under the crane pad. Rick pulls a number of planks out of the hole. When Billy excavates further, another structure is found.
80	20	"Short Days and Tall Knights"	April 9, 2019	3.05
Billy continues to excavate the most recently found structure at Smith's Cove. Wood samples are taken from the structures for testing using dendrochronology. On the shore of Lot 1, at the western side of the island, Gary and Jack find pottery and a military cuff button from the 1700s, both of which are similar to finds from the money pit area. In the war room, author and historian James McQuiston, whose research has convinced him that members of the Knights Templar deposited treasure on the island over a period of 400 years. He also presents a copy of a page from an ancient book describing the treasure. Marty and Gary explore a recently found well on Lot 16 near the money pit. Gary recovers a decorated piece of lead and a modern Canadian dollar coin.
81	21	"Seismic Matters"	April 16, 2019	3.16
With only two weeks left in the season Rick, Marty and Craig debate what they will do while the crane operators are on strike. They decide to conduct seismic testing in the swamp. At Smith's Cove, another wooden structure is found and excavation of that begins. A rust coloured patch of packed rocks with water flowing out is found. In the war room, members of the team meet with researcher Chris Donah who contacted them about the swamp and its relationship with the constellation Virgo. Eagle Canada returns to the island to conduct seismic testing in the swamp using 2,025 charges and 4,000 geophones. On Lot 27, Gary and Marty metal detect the spoils from a previous excavation of the swamp. They find a button, a coin or token with a square hole in it. In the war room, the dendrochronology results are revealed. The samples date to around 1770 with a 99.99% confidence.
82	22	"Lost and Founding"	April 30, 2019	3.32
Marty, Rick and Dave meet with Dan Blankenship to appraise him of the dendrochronology results. At Smith's Cove, Laird uncovers a wooden wall, packed with clay on both sides. Behind it, Rick finds another wall. Billy later uncovers a third wall. Meanwhile, Eagle Canada completes its seismic testing of the swamp. In the war room, researchers Bruce and Cort Lindahl and treasure hunter Justin Cannady explain Cort Lindahl's theory regarding Oak Island. Part of this involves the Appeal to Heaven flag, a copy of which is carved into a rock on the island's north shore. This provides a link to some of the Founding Fathers of the United States. The team has now run out of time and discusses what they have found in the war room before breaking for the winter. Note: This is the final episode in which Dan Blankenship appears.

=== Season 7 (2019–2020) ===
No. overall	No. in season	Title	Original release date	U.S. viewers (millions)
83	1	"The Torch Is Passed"	November 5, 2019	2.92
The narrator announces that Dan Blankenship has died. The first meeting in the war room acknowledges his absence. This year's objectives are discussed – looking for the large anomaly in the swamp, further drilling in the money pit area and extending the Smith's Cove coffer dam. Gary and Charles start metal detecting on Isaac's Point. They find a silver button that conservator Kelly Bourassa dates to a period between 1726 and 1776. Gary and Alex later find a hand mirror and an iron spike. Rick and Gary take the spike to Carmen Legge who explains that it is a pre-1800 hand-point chisel, stonemasons tool. In the swamp, Tony Sampson finds something solid, like a path. The position is compared with that of the large anomaly by Steve Guptil. The team decides to drill into the anomaly and subsequently meet there with Tom, Fred Nolan's son, and Brennan McMahon from Choice Drilling. Tom has now become part of the Oak Island team. A drilling barge is assembled and begins drilling in the swamp. At Smith's Cove, team members meet Mike Jardine from Irving Equipment to prepare a 120 ft × 50 ft (37 m × 15 m) extension (called a bump-out) to the coffer dam. Note: This is a two-hour episode.
84	2	"Core Values"	November 12, 2019	3.15
The first cores extracted from the swamp contain dry clay at about 20 ft (6 m). After the drill is stopped by something hard, it is decided to move to another site. At Smith's Cove, ground penetrating radar is used on the upper beach in search of the box drains. Near the cave-in pit two anomalies are found 82 ft (25 m) and 92 ft (28 m) down. Gary, Rick and Dan Henskee start metal detecting on Lot 21. They find two similar iron objects that appear to be sledgehammer heads. Marty and Rick meet with geoscientist Dr Ian Spooner. He examines the cores taken from the swamp and states his belief to be that the swamp was once open ocean and is not as old as it seems. In the war room, Carmen Legge examines a number of items recovered on the island including the iron objects recently found on Lot 21, which he explains are swages from the late 1400s, used for sharpening rock drills. This leads to the theory that a major mining or tunnelling operation was carried out on the island. Based on the coring results it seems that the swamp anomaly is not a ship, but may be a tunnel.
85	3	"Eye of the Swamp"	November 19, 2019	3.22
In the war room, Ian Spooner explains that the swamp could be only 300–400 years old. His examination of the northern part of the swamp revealed a possible rock wall around the eye of the swamp. When the team investigates, Gary uses his pinpointer and finds iron underwater as well as rock. The team decides to excavate the swamp. Alex, Peter and Charles travel to Saint Mary's University to have the swages tested. After examination under a scanning electron microscope, Christa Brosseau says that they appear to be pre-1840. At the Smith's Cove upper beach, Choice Drilling starts extracting cores in an attempt to find the flood tunnels. A core from 99 ft (30 m) contains pieces of dynamite from an attempt to destroy the flood tunnels in 1897–1898.
86	4	"The Lucky Thirteen"	November 26, 2019	3.14
Wood is recovered from 51 ft (16 m) down in one of the holes being bored in the Smith's Cove upper beach. C-14 testing dates the wood to between 1735 and 1784. Rick, Craig and Tom Nolan discuss excavation of the swamp, with Tom providing information on the explorations made by him and his father 30 years ago. Later, using an inflatable coffer dam, as they did in Smith's Cove, is considered. Gary and Charles return to Lot 21 and find an 1800s half penny coin, prior to uncovering a brooch. Alex and Laird travel to Acadia University to have Kelly Bourassa clean and examine the brooch. The cleaned brooch is shown to the team. Marty discovers that the tree on the brooch has 13 branches like the Appeal to Heaven flag.
87	5	"Tunnel Visions"	December 3, 2019	3.21
Still looking for the flood tunnels, a core from 99–109 ft (30–33 m) contains 4 ft (1.2 m) of sand, which suggests it may be from the flood tunnel. A core taken from 5 ft (1.5 m) away does not contain the same sand so coring is halted and Eagle Canada is tasked with seismic testing of most of the eastern drumlin. On Lot 27, which was once owned by Daniel McGinnis, an old chisel is found. Ground penetrating radar is used on Lot 21 where Daniel McGinnis built his home. As the foundation is considered a "special place", Laird is in control of the operation. A 4 ft (1.2 m) wide anomaly is detected 4 ft (1.2 m) down near an old well. In the war room, naval historian Chip Reid presents his theory that the structures in Smith's Cove may be part of a French military fortification called a "water battery". Similarity between the L-shaped structure and part of the water battery is immediately obvious. The team starts looking for a tunnel from shaft 9 to the south shore, which was dug to facilitate draining of the water from the money pit. The 159-year-old sluiceway is found to still be working.
88	6	"Closing In"	December 10, 2019	3.46
The team continues excavating the sluiceway. Steve Guptil determines the direction of the sluiceway using GPS. Using this information, they find a shaft near the money pit, which is believed to be shaft 9. Continued digging unearths the shaft 9 tunnel. Eagle Canada starts seismic testing at the cave-in pit, then in the highlands between the swamp and the money pit area. Gary and Peter metal detect on the shore of Lot 32, finding decking and cribbing spikes. In the war room, researcher D'arcy O'Connor discusses his theory that a lost Spanish galleon was the source of the Oak Island treasure. Carmen Legge examines the spikes found on Lot 32. He dates the deck spike to pre-1820. Eagle Canada completes its testing on the east end of the island.
89	7	"Things That Go Bump-Out"	December 17, 2019	3.30
Irving equipment starts construction of the coffer dam extension. Mike Jardine reports that he has found a wooden structure that is 10 ft (3 m) underwater at high tide in the bump-out area. In the research centre, Doug Crowell explains to Rick that he believes he has found the site of shaft 2 while examining old photos. Knowing this should enable the team to triangulate the position of the money pit. Choice Drilling starts drilling at the supposed location of shaft 2. Disturbed soil and wood is recovered from 33 ft (10 m) indicating that it is very likely that they are drilling in shaft 2. Rick, Doug, Alex and Billy travel to the Helen Creighton Heritage Museum in Dartmouth to follow up on a lead about the 90-foot stone given to Rick at Dan Blankenship's funeral. The team searches for the stone but is unable to find it. Gary and Jack search the beach areas on Lot 6 finding two small iron pins and a large cribbing spike that may have been used in an ancient wharf. With the bump-out completed, the team starts excavating and find a new structure covered with tar paper next to stacked rocks.
90	8	"Triptych"	January 7, 2020	3.07
The team continues to excavate the structure in the Smith's Cove bump-out area. Gary finds a cribbing spike. The footprint keeps extending which compromises the teams ability to excavate elsewhere in the bump-out so excavation is suspended for the time being. In the war room, researchers Corjan Mol and Christopher Morford present their theory that Nicolas Poussin left clues to the location of the Oak Island treasure in his paintings. At the swamp, Rick, Steve Guptil, Tony Sampson and ground penetrating radar experts scan the swamp looking for the location marked by Corjan Mol and Christopher Morford. They detect a 20 ft (6 m) wide anomaly. In the money pit area the team starts looking for shaft 2. They recover wood that contains a box joint, indicating they have touched a corner of a shaft. Two walls of the shaft are eventually located. One week later, Craig reports that the wood has been tested and has been dated to 1796.
91	9	"An Eye For An Eye"	January 14, 2020	3.40
With apparent confirmation that they have found shaft 2, the team decides to dig another hole designated F-14 in order to find the tunnel that was built from shaft 2 toward the money pit. At Smith's Cove, the area beyond the end of the slipway is examined and another wooden structure made of oak is found 10 ft (3 m) below normal sea level. It is later found to be similar in construction to the U-shaped structure. Rick theorizes that the slipway may have been built over an older structure. Back at the money pit, wood that may be from the shaft 2 tunnel at around 100 ft (30 m) deep is recovered from borehole F-14. In the war room, Corjan Mol and Christopher Morford expand on their theory after further research, now focussing on the "eye" of the swamp. The next day, geoscientist Ian Spooner and his students collect more data, including core samples, from the swamp. His analysis of the core samples causes him to believe the eye of the swamp was manipulated by humans in the 17th century while the swamp itself was made in 1220 AD.
92	10	"Gary Strikes Again"	January 21, 2020	3.26
The team examines the large structure that was found in the bump-out area at Smith's Cove. Laird wants it hand dug initially. Rick, Peter and Gary start metal detecting. Gary finds a rectangular piece of metal that he thinks is silver, but which Christa Brosseau later reports to be impure lead. After further testing it is found that the lead is 10% tin and is likely from the western Mediterranean region. Hand-sawn wood is recovered from 108 ft (33 m) in the money pit area, suggesting this is from the shaft 2 tunnel. The swamp is drained again and a long-reach tracked excavator is brought in to dig the swamp.
93	11	"The Eye of the Storm"	January 28, 2020	3.31
While excavating the swamp, ancient survey stakes similar to the ones Fred Nolan found are uncovered as Hurricane Dorian approaches Nova Scotia. Turning their focus to the area of the stone causeway there are problems with water flowing into the area that is being excavated. In Smith's Cove, Gary and Jack are metal-detecting. They find another wrought iron cribbing spike which they take, along with other cribbing spikes they have found, to blacksmith Carmen Legge for his appraisal. He believes the spikes date from the 1600s to 1820. A sample is taken from the recently discovered structure for dendrochronological testing. Another borehole is drilled in the money pit area to trace the shaft 2 tunnel back to the money pit. At 106 ft (32 m) very old, axe-cut wood that is possibly from the original money pit, is found. Activity is stopped so the team can prepare the island for the hurricane. When Dorian hits, the causeway to the island is damaged and the swamp is refilled. The team starts cleaning up and emptying the swamp.
94	12	"Fortified"	February 4, 2020	2.78
In the war room, Craig reports that the wood sample from Smith's Cove is red spruce from 1741, making it 20 years older than the slipway. Since Chip Reid believed that the Smith's Cove structures were part of a French military fortification, Rick and Doug travel to Fort Louisbourg to see if they can establish a connection. At the fortress they meet historian Sarah MacInnes who shows them a counter mine that was built under marshy land. The plans of the counter mine show it to be in the shape of a cross. Jack, Peter and Gary continue metal detecting on Lot 27. They find a lead sprue from musketball manufacture. On the beach they find an encrusted conglomerate with an axe in it. The swamp has been emptied and digging has recommenced, excavating mud and water that was washed in during the hurricane. Terry Matheson arrives and notes that he would expect to see boulders in the paved area laid out as they are 120 ft (37 m) down, not near the surface. Ian Spooner does not believe there is a natural process that would have resulted in such a formation. Laird believes it is man made.
95	13	"Bromancing the Stones"	February 11, 2020	3.23
Rick and Tom examine the paved area in the swamp. In the war room, it is compared to the drainage area at Fort Louisbourg. Ian Spooner discovers a stick between the rocks of the paved area, which means that the rocks could not have been laid down by a glacier. He takes the stick for scientific testing. Gary and Jack search the spoils around the paved area and find that it is a lot bigger than they thought. At the money pit, the latest core contains undisturbed soil meaning it is not from the money pit. Members of the team travel to Helen Creighton Heritage Museum in Dartmouth to conduct a more extensive search for the 90-foot stone. Despite their efforts, the stone is not found. Near the eye of the swamp, Gary and Jack find an old iron pick axe head and an ancient spade next to it. The wood that was found just before the hurricane and which was thought to be from the original money pit was C-14 dated and found to be from between 1626 and 1680. The latter date coincides with Ian Spooner's belief that the swamp was manipulated in the late 17th century.
96	14	"Burnt Offering"	February 25, 2020	3.13
News that the wood from borehole FG-12 could pre-date the money pit by more than 150 years encourages the team to put down a large caisson. At Smith's Cove the team discusses how best to excavate the recently found structure in the bump-out area. As Jack and Craig hand-dig near the structure, a large amount of dirt collapses. Later, part of the structure itself collapses so digging is stopped. In the swamp, Gary finds an iron strap that is shown to Laird, who suggests it should be examined by Carmen Legge. In the uplands, between Smith's Cove and the money pit, excavation in search of flood tunnels uncovers a wooden structure 15 ft (5 m) down. In a large log in the structure, a square-cut nail is found. Carmen Legge examines recent finds and says that the "spade" is more likely a cover for something and the pick-axe is from the mid-18th century. He believes the iron strap is from an old sailing ship and was common between 1710 and 1790. He reveals that it was in a very hot, sustained fire.
97	15	"Surely Templar"	March 3, 2020	3.21
While the team continues to dig in the swamp, finding a wooden survey stake, Marty and Craig talk with ROC Equipment's CEO, Vanessa Lucido, about putting down an 8 ft (2 m) diameter caisson in the money pit area. Meanwhile, while metal detecting in the swamp, Gary and Jack find a metal point that would have been on the end of a wooden shaft. Digging elsewhere in the swamp stops when extremely hard clay halts progress. In the war room James McQuiston expands upon his theory regarding the Knights Baronet and their links to the Knights Templar and freemasonry. A near surface archeological dig with Laird in charge is commenced on Lot 21 at the site of the McGinnis foundation. At the Smith's Cove uplands, a tunnel is uncovered. Jack discovers a large amount of what is later confirmed by Ian Spooner to be coconut fibre. Excavation of the collapsed tunnel continues until water starts pouring out of a deep shaft. Marty, Alex and Gary visit Carmen Legge who tells them that the point found in the swamp is a pike point and would have been used on a sailing ship.
98	16	"Water Logged"	March 10, 2020	3.19
Continuing the search for the original flood tunnel, Billy recovers hand-carved timbers from the trench in the uplands, followed by numerous timbers that indicate that the team has uncovered an old shaft. In the war room, Marty and Craig say that Eagle Canada's seismic testing has identified anomalies in the uplands about 60 ft (18 m) deep. A long-reach excavator is hired to dig deeper. At about 50 ft (15 m), more wood is recovered before water starts pouring in from the uphill side. The hole starts collapsing so Billy has to back-fill the hole to stabilize it. While the eye of the swamp is drained, Gary and Rick head to the shore of Lot 17. They discover a piece of scrap lead. Back at the swamp, boulders are found. Also found are large tree stumps, one of which has an iron rod embedded in it. Later, very large boulders are found on top of a layer of smaller rocks. Craig, Alex and Charles take the spikes found earlier in the week to Halifax to have them analysed by Christa Brosseau. Because of the level of phosphorus in the iron, she determines that the iron is pre-1840s and likely of European origin.
99	17	"To Boulderly Go"	March 17, 2020	3.52
Ian Spooner examines some recently uncovered boulders in the swamp that he says are similar to the paved area. Archaeologist Laird Niven concurs. Meanwhile, Marty discusses removal of the coffer dam with Irving Equipment. At the uplands, Billy continues excavating, recovering much wood from a searcher shaft. Further down, he recovers large pieces of axe-cut wood that are similar to wood used in the U-shaped structure. After Marty sees what appears to be a tunnel in the hole, a camera is lowered into the hole to get a better view of the structure. On Lot 21, Laird continues his archaeological dig at the McGinnis foundation. He discovers a wall that appears to have been part of a building next to the house and later comes to the conclusion that the root cellar included a trap door. In the war room, geochemistry professor Chris McFarlane tells the team that laser ablation testing of a recently found lead artifact reveals that the artifact has had Mercury and Tin introduced and it appears to have originated in Greece, Cyprus or Turkey.`With work in Smith's Cove and the uplands suspended, Irving Equipment starts removing the coffer dam.
100	18	"The Turning Point"	March 24, 2020	3.52
ROC Equipment and Irving Equipment, led by Vanessa Lucido, arrive on the island to install 8 ft (2.4 m) diameter caissons. At the swamp, Ian Spooner reveals that samples taken from the eye of the swamp have a high Mercury content. His colleague, archaeologist Aaron Taylor, joins the group to examine the stone structures at the eye of the swamp and the paved area. Together, they hypothesize that the eye of the swamp was a clay mine and the paved area provided access by horses and carts. While excavating to see how far the paved area extends, water starts pouring in the excavated area. A sample of the muddy water is taken and Rick tastes it, claiming that it is salty. When Ian Spooner examines it, he believes that it is connected to the paved area. On Lot 25, where Samuel Ball built his house, GPR is used to scan the area. Anomalies 6 ft (2 m) apart that may be walls are discovered. At the money pit, Dave Blankenship and Dan Henskee start the process of driving the 8 ft (2.4 m) caissons into the ground.
101	19	"Lords of the Ring"	March 31, 2020	3.59
102	20	"Springing the Trap"	April 7, 2020	3.49
103	21	"A Leaf of Faith"	April 14, 2020	3.46
104	22	"Marks X the Spot"	April 21, 2020	3.62
105	23	"Timeline"	April 28, 2020	3.41

=== Season 8 (2020–2021) ===
No. overall	No. in season	Title	Original release date	U.S. viewers (millions)
106	1	"Remote Control"	November 10, 2020	2.85
107	2	"The Boys are Back"	November 17, 2020	2.81
108	3	"If the Ox Shoes Fit"	November 24, 2020	2.86
The team decides to excavate. Jack Begley and Gary Drayton find iron remnants of oxen crossing the island near site 15. The Lagina brothers and the team meet with Irving Equipment to discuss the efficacy of a steel structure build out across the swamp to drain it. They hope to discover a possible man-made structure sitting underneath. Craig Tester seemed sceptical of the proposal, but was pacified by the acknowledgement of Irving that the team would be able to examine the northern end of the swamp during construction. Ultimately, Marty drove the conversation forward noting that if the quote from Irving was acceptable, construction could begin in a month.
109	4	"Alignment"	December 1, 2020	2.74
110	5	"The Master Plan"	December 8, 2020	2.76
111	6	"Seaing is Believing"	December 15, 2020	2.85
112	7	"Mounding Evidence"	December 22, 2020	2.81
113	8	"High On The Bog"	December 29, 2020	3.11
114	9	"Rock, Paper, Serpents"	January 5, 2021	2.99
Billy Gerhardt, Jack Begley, Gary Drayton, Rick Lagina, and Dr. Spooner investigate the mysterious stone structure in the southeastern corner of the swamp. They have obtained the necessary permits to begin excavating, so they have drained the water out of the southeastern corner of the swamp near the structure. As they dig, they discover more of the structure and see angled rocks pointing towards the Money Pit. Gary and Jack go metal detecting and find a plumb bob near the structure. Gary also finds blue pottery and charcoal. Meanwhile, Doug Crowell discusses theories about how the serpent mound could be created by members of the Knights Templar, and this is supported when Craig Tester reveals that the charcoal dated from the serpent mound structure has been dated to 1320 to 1440.
115	10	"Connecting the Lots"	January 12, 2021	2.93
116	11	"Rocky Road"	January 19, 2021	2.92
117	12	"Digging Their Heels In"	January 26, 2021	3.12
118	13	"The Fellowship of the Ringbolt"	February 9, 2021	2.84
119	14	"A Bend In The Road"	February 16, 2021	2.79
120	15	"Cask And You Shall Receive"	February 23, 2021	2.95
121	16	"Leather Bound"	March 2, 2021	2.89
The team uncovers more evidence of a possible connection.
122	17	"Staking Their Claim"	March 9, 2021	2.87
123	18	"Cannon Fodder"	March 16, 2021	2.95
124	19	"A Loose Cannonball"	March 23, 2021	3.18
125	20	"Fire in the Hole"	March 30, 2021	2.99
126	21	"Off the Railing"	April 6, 2021	2.78
127	22	"Be There or T-Square"	April 13, 2021	2.78
128	23	"Old Wharf's Tale"	April 20, 2021	2.93
129	24	"Silver Lining"	April 27, 2021	2.87
130	25	"The Silver Spooner"	May 4, 2021	2.85

=== Season 9 (2021–2022) ===
No. overall	No. in season	Title	Original release date	U.S. viewers (millions)
131	1	"Going for the Gold"	November 2, 2021	2.11
132	2	"The Gold Metal"	November 9, 2021	2.32
133	3	"Stone Roadblock"	November 16, 2021	2.50
134	4	"Spoils Alert"	November 23, 2021	2.43
135	5	"Hatching the Plan"	November 30, 2021	2.49
136	6	"The Root Cause"	December 7, 2021	2.60
137	7	"It All Adze Up"	December 14, 2021	2.58
138	8	"Deeper Digs, Bigger Stakes"	December 21, 2021	2.61
139	9	"The Unusual Suspects"	January 4, 2022	2.24
140	10	"Chamber of Secrets"	January 11, 2022	2.51
141	11	"A Boatload of Clues"	January 18, 2022	2.78
142	12	"The Silver Liner"	January 25, 2022	2.75
143	13	"Go Big or Go Home"	February 1, 2022	2.59
144	14	"Premier of the Dig"	February 8, 2022	2.51
145	15	"Eyes and Boot in the Ground"	February 15, 2022	2.69
146	16	"Gold Diggers"	March 1, 2022	2.49
147	17	"Blast from the Past"	March 8, 2022	2.61
148	18	"Playing the Dunfield"	March 15, 2022	2.52
149	19	"Shoal Me the Money"	March 22, 2022	2.68
150	20	"The Hedden Truth"	March 29, 2022	2.58
151	21	"A Lot of Secrets"	April 5, 2022	2.54
152	22	"Yes We Can"	April 12, 2022	2.64
153	23	"Follow the Cobblestone Road"	April 19, 2022	2.73
154	24	"On the Road"	April 26, 2022	2.47
155	25	"Treasure Island"	May 3, 2022	2.58

=== Season 10 (2022–2023) ===
No. overall	No. in season	Title	Original release date	U.S. viewers (millions)
156	1	"On Their Marks"	November 15, 2022	2.06
The fellowship gets a clear look at an underground structure as they continue beyond a decade of search.
157	2	"Across the Pond"	November 22, 2022	2.00
Marty and Alex find a shocking Templar connection when researching Royston Cave in England.
158	3	"Bubbling Over"	November 29, 2022	2.50
The team tries to get a member underground when they obtain scientific evidence of tunnels connected to the Garden shaft.
159	4	"Wharf and Pieces"	December 6, 2022	2.43
Marty may prove his off-set chamber theory, Gary unearths a lot of artefacts close to the ship's wharf.
160	5	"Duc It Out"	December 13, 2022	2.40
Ship logs may prove that a french armada may have visited the island, led by the Duc D'Anville.
161	6	"Over the Muon"	December 20, 2022	2.59
The team finds out they are chasing multiple tunnels to the garden shaft. Gary finds a new artefact.
162	7	"Norsing Around"	January 3, 2023	2.41
More evidence of a sunken ship; The team finds a collapsed tunnel in the money pit area.
163	8	"A Lot To Be Desired"	January 10, 2023	2.41
The team find what could be the missing piece of the mystery.
164	9	"A Damming Clue"	January 17, 2023	2.55
The team finds proof for two theories; Fred Nolan and Zena Halpern's.
165	10	"The Blob"	January 24, 2023	2.49
Scientific research narrows down the location of high-trace evidence of gold.
166	11	"Oh, Well!"	January 31, 2023	2.58
There is a man-made stone foundation of Lot 5, among other search activity.
167	12	"Beware the Blob"	February 7, 2023	2.24
The team tries to decipher why a 900-year old well is on Lot 26, the team finds a direct tunnel into the Garden shaft.
168	13	"All's Well"	February 14, 2023	2.51
More work to get members of the fellowship underground; Nolan's Cross may point to where the treasure is.
169	14	"Getting the Shaft"	February 21, 2023	2.70
Rick Lagina goes underground, the scientists narrow down the gold to "Baby Blob".
170	15	"Wood You Believe It?"	February 28, 2023	2.54
Closer to the gold... Confidence grows.
171	16	"Striking Gold"	March 7, 2023	2.59
Probe drilling in the money pit begins and reveals an offset chamber.
172	17	"A Well of Secrets"	March 14, 2023	2.56
The deeper the team goes in the Garden shaft, more gold traces are found.
173	18	"A Quadrilateral Move"	March 28, 2023	2.56
The team continues to probe drill, but also they find an ancient safe.
174	19	"Ramping Up"	April 4, 2023	2.30
Nova Scotia community culture and heritage reopens the swamp for investigation. The cobblestones could connect all together as a network.
175	20	"A Barrel Full of Clues"	April 11, 2023	2.49
The fellowship tries to rewrite North American history.
176	21	"Roman Around"	April 18, 2023	2.51
The team investigates a stone structure not unlike the money pit, and finds shocking ties to Italy.
177	22	"Starry Knights"	April 25, 2023	2.63
Harsh weather blows in and time is running out. The team goes to Italy and is shocked by the historical connections.
178	23	"The Italian Job"	May 2, 2023	2.56
A new discovery in the swamp; a cryptic connection between the HO stone and Knight's Templar in Italy.
179	24	"Down the Hatch"	May 9, 2023	2.57
The Garden shaft may warrant groundbreaking conclusive evidence, but time is running out.
180	25	"And The Hits Keep Coming"	May 16, 2023	2.60
Work wraps up, and Rick, Marty and Gary find metal detector hits at the base of the Garden shaft.

=== Season 11 (2023–2024) ===
No. overall	No. in season	Title	Original release date	U.S. viewers (millions)
181	1	"On the Money"	November 7, 2023	2.08
Time to relaunch the investigation. 4 coins are found on Lot 5, and time for the flooded Garden shaft to be pumped. Additions to the lab include the XRF scanning, run by Emma Culligan.
182	2	"Heavy Lifting"	November 14, 2023	2.07
Tests confirm gold and silver runs below the Garden Shaft. Lot 5 has a connection to English Privateer William Phipps.
183	3	"Taking Their Shot"	November 21, 2023	2.03
On Smith's cove, Rick and Gary find an artefact with roman numerals on it.
184	4	"Shear Mystery"	November 28, 2023	2.45
Evidence of multiple depositing operations in the money pit.
185	5	"Muon the Horizon"	December 5, 2023	2.34
Two years later, Muon tomography divulges a cavity known as Alladin's Cave and other areas on interest in the Money pit.
186	6	"The Grand Opening"	December 12, 2023	2.39
There are now man-made entrances in the Alladin's cave.
187	7	"The Great Flood"	December 19, 2023	2.23
As the Garden shaft reopens, the team may be jeopardized by a flood tunnel filling it up.
188	8	"A Void At All Costs"	January 2, 2024	2.53
A breakthrough comes after a setback.
189	9	"Filling Cavities"	January 9, 2024	2.43
While stopping water in the Garden shaft, Lot 5 reveals more strong ties to William Phipps and the Templars.
190	10	"Chain Reaction"	January 16, 2024	2.46
Returning to the swamp warrants discovery of large cargo being deposited on it.
191	11	"Plugged Up"	January 23, 2024	2.33
The fellowship finds another structure in the swamp and may have intercepted the Chappell Vault.
192	12	"Digging Back In"	January 30, 2024	2.37
There are clues on Lot 5 connected to William Phipps, evidence of off-loading in the swamp, and the team still chases the elusive hidden tunnel in the money pit.
193	13	"Tea Time"	February 6, 2024	2.48
The team begins to probe drill in the Garden shaft, having reached a target depth of 95ft. Gary finds more discoveries in the swamp.
194	14	"Rick and Mortar"	February 13, 2024	2.44
Science has irrevocably connected Lot 5 and the Money pit.
195	15	"On Target"	February 20, 2024	2.48
196	16	"Dark and Stormy"	February 27, 2024	2.45
197	17	"Piling On"	March 5, 2024	2.43
198	18	"May The Norse Be With You"	March 12, 2024	2.42
199	19	"Hi Ho Silver"	March 19, 2024	2.42
200	20	"Wet and Wild"	March 26, 2024	2.50
201	21	"Straight as an Arrow"	April 2, 2024	2.44
202	22	"Abbey road"	April 9, 2024	2.17
203	23	"Cone E island"	April 16, 2024	2.21
204	24	"Hairy situation"	April 23, 2024	2.09
205	25	"Worth the Weight"	April 30, 2024	2.06

=== Season 12 (2024–2025) ===
No. overall	No. in season	Title	Original release date	U.S. viewers (millions)
206	1	"The New Digs"	November 12, 2024	1.44
The team returns with renewed confidence and Billy excavates Shaft 2 in the money pit area. There are new archaeologists who will help on Lot 5 and also investigating Stone cairns on Lot 23.
207	2	"Whistle While You Work"	November 19, 2024	1.65
208	3	"The Saga Continues"	November 25, 2024	1.75
The team visits L'Anse aux Meadows in Newfoundland, the site of the only confirmed Viking settlement in North America, to compare the site there with the newly revealed structures on Oak Island.
209	4	"Concrete Evidence"	December 3, 2024	1.81
Renewed digging in Smith's Cove, intended to find the flood tunnel system, produces evidence of concrete used by previous searchers in attempts to plug the flood tunnels.
210	5	"A Flood of Secrets"	December 10, 2024	1.62
211	6	"Hide and Seek"	December 17, 2024	1.77
212	7	"It's All Your Vault"	January 7, 2025	1.72
213	8	"A Bead on the Target"	January 13, 2025	1.65
214	9	"Brick by Brick"	January 21, 2025	1.82
In the swamp, the team uncovers a previously unknown structure remarkably resembling a container. And after weeks of chasing the elusive Chappell Vault, the Fellowship hits a void deep in the Money Pit.
215	10	"Graves Concerns"	January 28, 2025	1.66
216	11	"Best Caisson Scenario"	February 4, 2025	1.76
217	12	"Mapping It Out"	February 11, 2025	1.75
218	13	"Caissons Ho!"	February 25, 2025	1.71
219	14	"Sinking In"	March 4, 2025	1.45
220	15	"Channeling the Solution"	March 11, 2025	1.78
221	16	"Open Sesame"	March 18, 2025	1.67
222	17	"Boots on the Ground"	March 25, 2025	1.74
223	18	"If the Shoe Phips"	April 1, 2025	1.67
224	19	"Barreling Forward"	April 8, 2025	1.72
.
225	20	"Just Bead It"	April 15, 2025	1.66
226	21	"The Solution Solution"	April 22, 2025	1.699
227	22	"Knight After Knight"	April 29, 2025	TBD
228	23	"Family Ties"	May 6, 2025	TBD
229	24	"Into the Void"	May 13, 2025	TBD
230	25	"Uplifting Discoveries"	May 20, 2025	TBD

=== Season 13 (2025-2026) ===
No. overall	No. in season	Title	Original release date	U.S. viewers (millions)
231	1	"The Comeback"	November 4, 2025	N/A
New
232	2	"Billion Dollar Baby"	November 11, 2025	N/A
233	3	"Medieval Intentions"	November 18, 2025	N/A
234	4	"The Smoking Gun"	November 25, 2025	N/A

== Specials ==
No. in series	Featured season	Title	Original release date	U.S. viewers (millions)
1	5	"The Journey So Far"	November 7, 2017	1.94
Prior to the start of the fifth season, this episode recaps the exploration of Oak Island over the past four seasons, hosted by Matty Blake with commentary by Marty and Rick Lagina.
2	5	"The Templar Connection"	February 13, 2018	2.34
A history of the Knights Templar is presented along with speculative theories about how they might have been involved with Oak Island.
3	5	"A Family Album"	February 27, 2018	1.98
The episode details the history of the Oak Island search and includes accounts of activities on the Oak Island by family and descendants of Daniel McGinnis, Samuel Ball, William Chappell, Robert Restall and Robert Dunfield. The Blankenship/Nolan dispute on Oak Island is discussed. The episode ends with a short history of the Lagina brothers' interest in Oak Island.
4	7	"The Top 25 Finds"	October 8, 2019	1.07
This episode lists the top 25 Oak Island finds since the first discovery of the money pit in 1795. The episode reveals the results of the seismic testing carried out last season in the swamp. A 200 ft (61 m) long and 25–40 ft (8–12 m) wide anomaly was found at the bottom of the swamp.
5	7	"The Top 25 Theories"	October 15, 2019	0.97
Hosted by Matty Blake, this episode investigates the top 25 theories about the island, as determined by Marty, Rick and the Oak Island team, the producers of the program and Oak Island tourists, starting with Captain Kidd's treasure. Theories include links to other famous historical individuals including Sir Francis Drake, Franklin D. Roosevelt, Marie Antoinette, Francis Bacon, William Shakespeare and Christopher Columbus. Also addressed are the connections to the Knights Templar and freemasonry.
6	7	"The Top 25 Moments"	October 22, 2019	0.72
Matty Blake hosts this episode which recaps the top 25 moments of the series from the first 6 seasons.
7	7	"The Top 25 Moments You Never Saw"	October 29, 2019	1.03
Matty Blake hosts this special episode which reveals the top 25 moments, as picked by the producers and writers, that were never shown on screen in previous episodes.
8	7	"The Top 10 Finds"	April 26, 2020	0.89
9	7	"The Top 10 Moments You Never Saw"	April 26, 2020	0.88
10	7	"The Top 10 Theories"	April 27, 2020	0.97
11	7	"The Top 10 Moments"	April 27, 2020	0.82
12	9	"The Top Ten Finds You Never Saw"	October 5, 2021	0.76
13	9	"The Top Ten Templar Ties"	October 12, 2021	0.77
14	9	"The Top Ten Signs of Buried Treasure"	October 19, 2021	0.68
15	9	"The Fellowship's Top 10 Finds"	October 26, 2021	0.75
16	9	"First Look: Going for the Gold"	November 1, 2021	N/A
17	10	"Oak Island's Top Ten Suspects"	October 11, 2022	0.78
18	10	"The Fellowship's Top Ten Swamp Revelations"	October 18, 2022	0.72
19	10	"The Top Ten Portuguese Connections"	October 25, 2022	0.71
20	10	"The Fellowship's Top Ten Money Pit Discoveries"	November 1, 2022	0.64
21	10	"First Look: On Their Marks"	November 14, 2022	N/A

== Series spin-offs and extended episodes ==
=== The Curse of Oak Island: Drilling Down ===
No. in series	Title	Original release date	U.S. viewers (millions)
1	"No known subtitle"	November 10, 2015	N/A
2	"No known subtitle"	January 5, 2016	1.74
3	"No known subtitle"	January 12, 2016	1.60
4	"No known subtitle"	January 19, 2016	1.32
5	"No known subtitle"	January 26, 2016	1.61
6	"No known subtitle"	February 9, 2016	1.15
7	"The Boys are Back"	November 15, 2016	1.54
8	"The Journey Continues"	November 14, 2017	1.56
9	"The Puzzle Takes Shape"	March 13, 2018	1.31
10	"Nothing Will Stop Them"	November 13, 2018	1.91
11	"Putting the Pieces Together"	January 2, 2019	0.69
12	"The Truth Behind the Curse"	February 19, 2019	2.40
Matty Blake examines the history of Oak Island, trying to determine the validity of the curse. It is revealed that Fred Nolan never spent a night on the island, a mysterious fireball once approached the island but disappeared without trace, Dan Henskee was once "possessed", a four-year-old girl observed the ghosts of several British soldiers, and other mysterious things have happened over time. A parapsychologist conducts an investigation at several points on the island.
13	"The Pirates of Oak Island"	March 19, 2019	1.69
14	"The Secret Weapons"	April 23, 2019	2.08
15	"Legacy"	May 7, 2019	1.61
16	"Finding Answers"	November 5, 2019	1.93
17	"The Great Feud"	January 21, 2020	1.73
18	"William Shatner Meets Oak Island"	February 25, 2020	2.02
19	"The Shakespeare Connection"	April 28, 2020	1.78
20	"Closer Than Ever"	May 5, 2020	1.58
21	"Oak Island and the Founding Fathers"	May 12, 2020	1.29
22	"Hold on To Your Seats"	November 10, 2020	1.76
23	"Gary Drayton's Top 10 Finds"	January 5, 2021	1.46
24	"Dave Blankenship's Oak Island"	February 2, 2021	1.67
25	"The Oak Island Connection"	February 23, 2021	1.41
26	"The Making Of"	April 27, 2021	1.16
27	"Theories Galore"	May 4, 2021	1.34
28	"The Best Is Yet To Come"	May 11, 2021	1.14
29	"Rick and Marty's Top Moments"	May 18, 2021	0.81
30	"Dawn of the Dig"	November 2, 2021	1.45
31	"Behind the Quest"	December 28, 2021	1.54
32	"Preserving the Hunt"	January 4, 2022	1.32
33	"The Ultimate Timeline"	February 15, 2022	1.20
34	"The Sea-crets of Oak Island"	March 29, 2022	1.23
35	"The Freemason Factor"	May 3, 2022	1.22
36	"Always Forward"	May 10, 2022	0.98
37	"The Ultimate Answers"	May 17, 2022	0.86
38	"The Game is Afoot"	November 15, 2022	1.26
39	"Decoding the Money Pit"	December 27, 2022	1.61
40	"Deep Inside the Dig"	March 21, 2023	1.30
41	"European Connections"	April 11, 2023	1.18
42	"Closing In"	May 23, 2023	N/A

=== Behind the Dig ===
No. in series	Title	Original release date	U.S. viewers (millions)
1	"Rick's Big Bang Theory"	November 20, 2018	1.42
2	"Gold Rush"	November 27, 2018	1.80
3	"Depth Perception"	December 4, 2018	1.62
4	"A Legacy Revealed"	December 11, 2018	1.49
5	"Homecoming"	December 18, 2018	1.62

=== The Curse of Oak Island: Digging Deeper ===
No. in series	Title	Original release date	U.S. viewers (millions)
1	"Rock Solid"	January 8, 2019	N/A
2	"As Above, So Below"	January 22, 2019	N/A
3	"Fingers Made of Stone"	January 29, 2019	N/A

=== Tales From Oak Island ===
No. in series	Title	Original release date	U.S. viewers (millions)
1	"The Article"	November 19, 2024	N/A
2	"The Legend of Samuel Ball"	November 26, 2024	N/A
3	"The Secrets of Sir William Phips"	December 3, 2024	N/A
4	"The Trail of the Templar Cross"	December 10, 2024	N/A
5	"Decoding the Duc D'Anville"	December 17, 2024	N/A
6	"Hedden's Hunt"	December 17, 2024	N/A

== Beyond Oak Island ==
=== Season 1 (2020–2021) ===
No. overall	No. in season	Title	Original release date	U.S. viewers (millions)
1	1	"Pirate Treasures"	November 17, 2020	1.85
When a young treasure hunter tells Rick and Marty he is hunting for the long lost treasure of pirate Jean Lafitte, the brothers are so intrigued they send Matty Blake to assist in a dangerous dive to further the search.
2	2	"Wild West Gold"	November 24, 2020	1.56
Oak Island metal detection expert, Gary Drayton joins a relative of Butch Cassidy on a treasure hunt to the legendary robber's roost and unearths a piece of outlaw treasure history.
3	3	"Finders Keepers"	December 1, 2020	1.71
After personally investing in a treasure hunt off the coast of Florida, Marty Lagina and Craig Tester are thrilled when their search uncovers rare and historical artifacts. But the duo must quickly come to terms with the complicated world of treasure ownership.
4	4	"The Lost Dutchman Curse"	December 8, 2020	1.54
The Laginas are astounded to learn that on a trip to Arizona, Gary Drayton may have gotten to the bottom of one of the biggest treasure mysteries of all time, one that has resulted in countless deaths and disappearance for those obsessed with finding it.
5	5	"Deep Water Gold"	December 15, 2020	1.48
Rick and Marty's good friend and world class wreck diver, John Chatterton, heads south to search for a never recovered Spanish ship off the coast of Florida, and Gary Drayton shares with the brothers his most compelling, and valuable, find ever.
6	6	"Civil War Gold"	December 22, 2020	1.50
Things get dicey when the Laginas deploy Matty Blake to the wild west, where he assists in a dangerous investigation with a local treasure hunter to uncover the secrets of missing Civil War gold.
7	7	"Midwest Millions"	December 29, 2020	1.72
Marty's childhood dreams are realized when he's invited to join the search for a lost treasure off the coast of an abandoned, and dangerous, island in Lake Michigan.
8	8	"Montezuma's Treasure"	January 26, 2021	1.69
Marty's fascination is piqued when a fellow energy entrepreneur shares evidence that suggests his Utah ranch has been the Aztec hiding place of Montezuma's treasure for centuries.

=== Season 2 (2022) ===
No. overall	No. in season	Title	Original release date	U.S. viewers (millions)
9	1	"The 1715 Treasure Fleet"	January 4, 2022	1.37
Rick and Marty Lagina, along with Matty Blake, head to Florida and join Gary Drayton to hunt for millions in gold, silver and jewels from the shipwrecks of the famed 1715 Spanish Treasure Fleet.
10	2	"Riverboat Riches"	January 11, 2022	1.53
Marty Lagina and Matty Blake travel to Kansas City, Missouri, to assist river-boat enthusiast David Hawley as he searches for two 19th century wrecks loaded with lost riches and American history.
11	3	"The Buried Loot of Sam Bass"	January 18, 2022	1.46
The Laginas and Matty Blake help treasure hunters Donna McCauley and Gypsy Jewels search two hideouts in Mineral Springs, Texas where the legendary outlaw Sam Bass is believed to have stashed more than a million dollars in stolen gold.
12	4	"The 1715 Treasure Fleet Part II"	January 25, 2022	1.39
Matty Blake heads back to Florida's famed Treasure Coast, to team up with professional treasure salvager John Brandon and his team as they dive on the wrecks of the famed 1715 Spanish Treasure Fleet.
13	5	"The Lost Josephine Mine"	February 1, 2022	1.50
The Laginas and Matty Blake offer their help to a team of treasure hunters in Utah, as they search deep underground for billions in gold at a site believed to be the legendary Lost Josephine Mine.
14	6	"The Search for the San Saba Mine"	February 8, 2022	1.39
The Laginas head to Texas with Matty Blake to help treasure hunter Hoppy Eubanks and his team search for the legendary lost San Saba Mine and over a billion dollars in silver.
15	7	"Pancho Villa's Plunder"	March 1, 2022	1.21
The Laginas and Matty Blake help a team in El Paso, Texas hunt for buried treasure at the stash house of the notorious Mexican revolutionary, Pancho Villa, leading to a number of historic discoveries.
16	8	"Peter Easton's Plunder"	March 15, 2022	1.24
Rick Lagina and Matty Blake brave the waters of Newfoundland with diver Tony Sampson and a team to look for sunken treasure connected to the notorious pirate, Peter Easton.

=== Season 3 (2022–2023) ===
No. overall	No. in season	Title	Original release date	U.S. viewers (millions)
SP1	Special–1	"First Look: The Atocha's Emerald City"	September 27, 2022	N/A
17	1	"The Atocha's Emerald City"	October 4, 2022	0.84
Rick, Marty and Matty go diving in Key West Florida to search for the emeralds of the Atocha shipwreck.
18	2	"The Best of Beyond Oak Island"	October 4, 2022	0.57
Rick, Marty and Matty Blake take a look at the best missions of Beyond Oak island.
19	3	"The Riches of Poverty Island"	October 11, 2022	0.88
Marty Latina goes back to Poverty Island in Lake Michigan to hunt for an elusive shipwreck.
20	4	"Aury's Treasure"	October 18, 2022	0.85
Marty Lagina and Matty Blake go in search of the buried treasure of Captain Louis Aury on a beach in Florida.
21	5	"The Atocha: Secrets of the Sterncastle"	October 25, 2022	0.90
Matty Blake and diver Tony Sampson return to Atocha for the hunt of the sterncastle.
22	6	"Return to Poverty Island"	November 1, 2022	0.85
Marty and Rick go back to Poverty Island to look for another shipwreck in helicopter.
23	7	"North Carolina Gold"	November 8, 2022	0.76
Matty Blake and metal detector Nikolone Bohr help a father and son team in North Carolina look for gold in a swamp.
24	8	"The Booty of 'Black Sam' Bellamy"	January 3, 2023	1.25
Matty Blake and The Laginas go looking for a treasure on the legendary Whydah shipwreck.
25	9	"The Lost Cache of Cornwallis"	January 10, 2023	1.23
Matty Blake goes black water river diving with Matt Howell.
26	10	"The Legend of Oderin Island"	January 17, 2023	1.38
Marty Blake, Marty Lagina and diver Tony Sampson go hunting for a treasure in Newfoundland.
27	11	"Return to the Wydah"	January 24, 2023	1.26
Matty Blake and diver Tony Sampson return to Samuel Bellamy's shipwreck off the coast of Poverty Island with a research couple who fly in a helicopter.
28	12	"Treasured Adventures"	January 31, 2023	1.18
Matty Blake reviews the missions made in 2022 with Rick and Marty Lagina. Last Episode

== See also ==
- The Curse of Oak Island personnel
