= Kathleen McGowan =

American author (born 1963)

- Born: Kathleen Harkey-Smith; March 22, 1963 (age 63)
- Occupation: Author
- Spouse(s): Peter McGowan (divorced 2010) Philip Coppens (m. 2011; died 2012) Nasser Abo Nazer (m. 2023)
- Children: 3
- Website: kathleenmcgowan.com

Kathleen McGowan (born March 22, 1963) is an American author. Born Kathleen Harkey-Smith, her first book was Tragic Kingdom: Inside Michael Eisner’s Disney. As Kathleen McGowan, her novel The Expected One sold over a million copies worldwide and has appeared in over fifty languages. She claims to be a descendant of Jesus Christ and Mary Magdalene.

== The Magdalene Line series ==
The Magdalene Line is a series of novels, featuring both fictitious and historical female characters which the author believes history has either misrepresented or obliterated.

Kathleen McGowan began working on the first novel The Expected One in 1989. Focusing on the role of Mary Magdalene, it was self-published in 2005, and sold 2,500 copies. On July 25, 2006, the book was re-published by Simon & Schuster under the Touchstone imprint and became a New York Times Best Seller.

The second novel of the series is The Book of Love, published in 2009, focusing on the life of Mathilda of Canossa which is also a NYT Best Seller.

The third novel of the series is The Poet Prince, published in 2010, focusing on the life of Lorenzo de Medici which is also a NYT best seller.

Each novel of the series features the fictitious heroine Maureen Paschal, who is tasked with uncovering alleged historical and Christian enigmas. Other fictitious characters include Berenger Sinclair and Tamara Wisdom, as well as the enigmatic character Destino.

== The Source of Miracles ==
The Source of Miracles is a self-help book, based on the Lord's Prayer and offering the reader seven steps to transform their life. The process is based on the six-petalled rose depicted at the center of the Chartres Cathedral labyrinth.

== Works ==
- The Boleyn Heresy: The Time Will Come, 2022
- The Poet Prince, 2010
- The Source of Miracles: Seven Steps to Transforming Your Life Through the Lord's Prayer, Fireside, 2009.ISBN 978-1-4391-3765-9
- The Book of Love, 2009.
- The Expected One, Touchstone, 2006. ISBN 0-7432-9942-6
- Sherdhana's Hand (lyrics)
- The St Patrick's Day Song (lyrics)
- Tragic kingdom: Inside Michael Eisner's Disney (as Kathleen Harkey-Smith), 1997 ISBN 978-1-55972-444-9

== Television appearances ==
She has appeared as a presenter on the History Channel and H2 television series Ancient Aliens. She has also appeared as a presenter on Bible Secrets Revealed, and made appearances in episodes during season 2 and season 5 of The Curse of Oak Island, both shows also on the History Channel. On an episode of "Mysteries of the Bible" She emphatically stated that "a group of men with agendas of politics and economics and not spirituality, decided on the texts of the bible."

== Personal life ==
McGowan has been married three times. Her first marriage was to Irish musician Peter McGowan and they had three children together. That marriage ended in divorce in 2010. She was then married to Philip Coppens in 2011, who died a year later in 2012. Together they produced the internet radio program "The Spirit Revolution". In March 2023, she married Egyptian mystic Nasser Abo Nazer, based at Abydos, Egypt and now spends part of the year in Luxor, Egypt.
