= Brosseau =

Brosseau, a French surname, could mean:

== People ==
- Christa Brosseau, Canadian chemist
- Ruth Ellen Brosseau (b. 1984), Canadian Member of Parliament
- Mike Brosseau, American baseball player
- Thomas Anderson "Tom" Brosseau, American singer-songwriter
- Gerald Brosseau Gardner (1884–1964), English civil servant, amateur anthropologist, writer, and occultist
- Grace Lincoln Hall Brosseau (1872–1959), American civic leader

== Places ==
- Brosseau, a hamlet or village in Alberta, Canada
- Brosseau Station, a former village and former railway station in present-day Brossard, Quebec, Canada

== Other ==
- Rochelle Brosseau v. Kenneth J. Haugen ~ 543 U.S. 194, 2004 U.S. Supreme Court decision

== See also ==
- Brousseau
