= Philip Coppens (author) =

Belgian writer

- Born: Filip Coppens; 25 January 1971; Sint-Niklaas, Belgium
- Died: 30 December 2012 (aged 41); Los Angeles, US
- Resting place: Court of Freedom, Forest Lawn Memorial Park
- Occupations: Writer, journalist
- Known for: Alternative history and fringe science theories
- Website: http://www.philipcoppens.com/

Philip Coppens (25 January 1971 – 30 December 2012) was a Belgian author, radio host, and commentator whose writings, speeches and television appearances focused on areas of fringe science and alternative history.

Coppens was born in Sint-Niklaas, Belgium. He was a cohost of the Spirit Revolution radio show, his writing was featured in Nexus and Atlantis Rising magazines, and he appeared in 56 episodes of the History Channel's Ancient Aliens television series.

He was married to Kathleen McGowan on 22 September 2011. He died a year later on 30 December 2012 in Los Angeles, California, of angiosarcoma.

== Career ==
Philip Coppens started his writing career as an investigative journalist, covering intelligence activities and politics. In 1995, he was a co-founder of Frontier 2000 (later called Frontier Magazine), a periodical with a circulation centered primarily in the Benelux countries. In 1999, he served as the primary researcher for The Stargate Conspiracy, a book about ancient Egypt and the degree to which its history has a continuing influence on contemporary politics and politicians, with particular focus on the CIA's remote-viewing program Stargate Project.

Coppens' second book, The Canopus Revelation (2004), questioned the assumption that ancient Egyptians associated their god Osiris with the constellation of Orion. Instead he proposed Canopus, the second brightest star in the night-time sky. He appeared at Quest Conference 2005 to give a presentation on this idea.

In Servants of the Grail (2009), Coppens suggested real-life counterparts for the characters in Chrétien de Troyes' Perceval, the Story of the Grail. These included the identification of Rotrou III, Count of Perche with Perceval. Also in 2009, he contributed a chapter to Ancient Code: Are You Ready for the Real 2012?, entitled "Ancient Inroads Towards a New Age".

From 2010 to 2012, Coppens was a frequent contributor to the History Channel's Ancient Aliens series. Nigerian journalist J.K. Obatala, writing about a month after Coppens' death, described him as an "ancient alien buff." Obatala credited Coppens with helping to debunk a claim that the Dogon Ayantu (spiritual leaders) of Mali had astronomical knowledge they could only have obtained from visitors from Sirius – in an article entitled "Dogon Shame." In this article, (originally published in Fortean Times), Coppens stated "it seems that Griaule, a scientist, wanted to attribute to earlier civilisations more knowledge than they actually possessed."

In October 2012, he was a featured presenter at Intrepid Magazine's Paradigm Symposium.

A eulogy for Coppens, published in Intrepid's January print edition, included a quotation from Coppens' final post to his personal blog: "I was diagnosed with an extremely rare case of cancer, angiosarcoma, which affects less than 200 people in the U.S. (each year). Each case is almost by default unique… and so I found that the man who normally studies anomalies, has become a medical enigma as well." Roughly a fortnight later, Coppens died.

== Bibliography ==
- Coppens, Philip (2002). The Stone Puzzle of Rosslyn Chapel. Frontier Publishing/Adventures Unlimited Press. ISBN 1-931882-08-8.
- Coppens, Philip (2004). The Canopus Revelation: Stargate of the Gods and the Ark of Osiris. Enkhuizen, The Netherlands: Frontier Publishing. ISBN 1-931882-26-6.
- Coppens, Philip (2007). Land of the Gods: How a Scottish Landscape Was Sanctified to Become Arthur's Camelot. Enkhuizen, The Netherlands: Frontier Publishing. ISBN 978-1-931882-69-9.
- Coppens, Philip (2007). The New Pyramid Age. Axis Mundi Books. ISBN 978-1846940460.
- Coppens, Philip (2009). Servants of the Grail. Axis Mundi Books. ISBN 978-1846941559.
- Coppens, Philip (2011). The Ancient Alien Question: A New Inquiry into the Existence, Evidence, and Influence of Ancient Visitors. Pompton Plains, NJ: New Page Books. ISBN 978-1601631985.
- Coppens, Philip (2012). The Lost Civilization Enigma. New Page Books. ISBN 978-1601632326.
- Coppens, Philip (2012). Killing Kennedy. BookBaby. ASIN B0070DP0IW.
- Coppens, Philip (2012). The Cryptogram of Rennes-le-Château. BookBaby. ASIN B009164WH6.
