= James Brusseau =

Philosopher

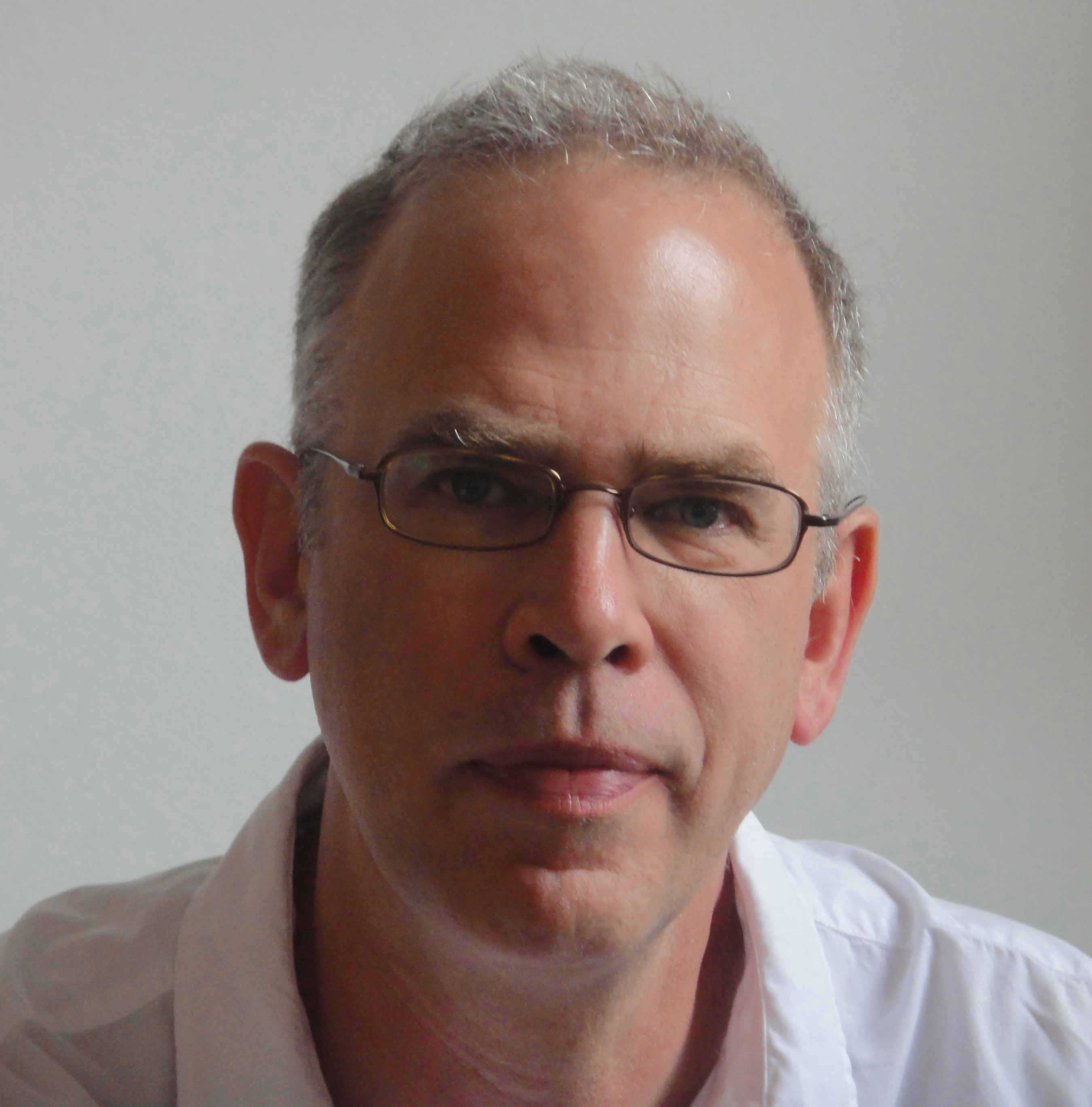
Brusseau in 2012

James Brusseau is a philosopher specializing in contemporary Continental philosophy, history of philosophy and ethics. In 1994, Brusseau joined the faculty of Philosophy and Letters at the Mexican National University in Mexico City teaching graduate courses in philosophy and comparative literature. He has also taught in Europe and the California State University. Currently he teaches at Pace University in New York City. Brusseau took a Ph.D. in Philosophy under the direction of Alphonso Lingis He is currently a professor at Pace University in New York City. He is also a visiting professor in the Department of Information Engineering and Science at the University of Trento in Italy.

== Scholarship ==
Brusseau’s work in autonomy, authenticity, and recommendation algorithms analyzes recommenders as they shape future interests with predictions generated from past preferences, meaning they recycle who we have already been. This recursivity raises new questions about personal identity, freedom, and authenticity. Some of those questions involve the discontinuity of personal identity. There are also questions about breaking out of the algorithmic feedback loop. They include: How can users diverge from who they have been? How could the divergence be accomplished theoretically, technically, and practically?

Acceleration AI ethics takes one side in the debate between innovation and AI safety in technological development. Brusseau argues that innovation’s accompanying problems can be best solved with still more innovation. Contrastingly, there is the position that the guarantee of safety should precede technological advance. Both alternatives are forms of responsible AI, but the acceleration argument supports the first, and work in the area focuses on developing the fundamental human values supporting the approach.

Brusseau has authored and co-authored multiple ethics evaluations of AI tools. His work in AI ethics evaluations and AI alignment is pursued through three steps. First, a socio-technical scenario is developed to explain the AI tool in language that crosses applicable domains. In the case of a medical tool, the domains would include ethics, computer science, medicine, law, and business. Second, the evaluation is executed by applying the ethical values to the tool, and by applying the tool’s use to the values. Finally, a report documents the process and may propose recommendations.

Brusseau's scholarship in the history of philosophy focuses on philosophical decadence. He argues that the relation between thinking and truth reverses in some aspects of French-Nietzschean philosophy. We do not have thought to reach truth, instead, we have truths to catalyze more thinking. For decadents, every philosophic conclusion is valued purely in terms of its ability to generate more thought. So, within this framework, whether a philosopher is right about things becomes a secondary or derivative concern. The guiding purpose is to provoke more strictly philosophical discussion and study. Brusseau attempts to locate decadence in the history of philosophy at Friedrich Nietzsche's appropriation by recent French philosophers including Michel Foucault, Gilles Deleuze and Jacques Derrida. He calls the moment a "reversal" in philosophy's history in the sense that thought no longer exists to pursue truth, instead, truths exist to serve and accelerate the next round of thinking. Finally, it is unclear from Brusseau's published work and lectures whether he considers this development to be negative, neutral or positive.

The book Isolated Experiences argues for the radical discontinuity of personal identity, and the emergence of new personal identities, within the larger context of Gilles Deleuze’s reversal of Platonism. The theoretical foundation is the metaphysics of difference as developed by Deleuze, Georges Bataille, and Nietzsche. Practically, the experience of discontinuity in personal identity is explored through literary works, including the writings of the nomadic traveler Isabelle Eberhardt.

Brusseau's Dignity, Pleasures, Vulgarity: Philosophy and Animal Rights asks how animal studies reflect back to reveal human truths.

== Books ==
- Isolated Experiences, State University of New York Press, 1996
- Decadence of the French Nietzsche, Rowman & Littlefield, 2004
- Business Ethics Workshop, Flat World Knowledge, 2011
- Ethics Workshop, Flat World Knowledge, 2015
- Dignity, Pleasures, Vulgarity: Philosophy + Animal Rights, Overflow, 2016
