= Joseph Brousseau =

Joseph Brousseau (1733–1797) was an architect active in Limousin, France, in the 18th century. His work includes Château de Faye, Limoges, Lycée Gay-Lussac, the bishops Palace in Limousin, Chapel of the Visitation, various castles in the vicinity of Limoges, and the Episcopal Palace of the Sée in Normandy.

== Early life ==
Born in Solignac in Haute-Vienne to 1733. He was the fourth of ten children, to Jean Brousseau, a Carpenter, and Catherine Boudet. He was baptised in the parish of Sainte-Félicité de Limoges, near Pont Saint-Martial on 17 September.

Brousseau grew up in Limoges. He learned "on the job," as a stone-cutter and fitter. He then began to draw plans himself and learned the trade of a architecture. From the 1760s, he became known in the region for his work.

His first project as architect was the castle of Sainte-Feyre; it was built on the foundations of the ancient fortress between 1758 and 1762.

He died at Sées on February 5, 1797.

== Corpus of work ==
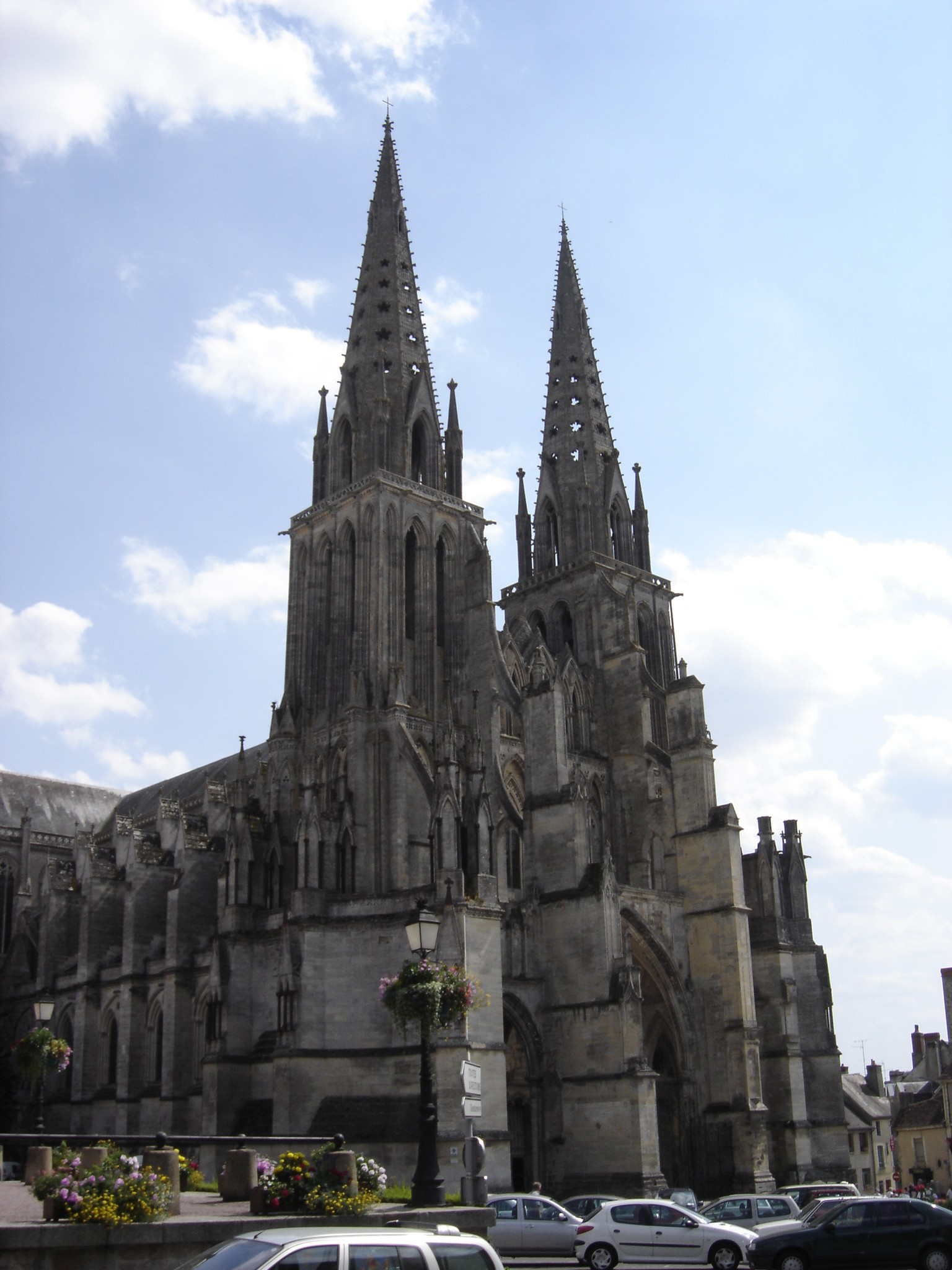
Sées Cathedral

He completed numerous projects including:

- Château de Sainte – Feyre, on the bases of the feudal Castle near Guéret (Creuse), 1760
- Château de Salvanet
- Castle of the husk, Veyrac, 1763
- Château de Beauvais, Limoges, 1765
- Palace of the bishopric, Limoges, 1766
- Musée de l'Evêché
- New facade of the college of Limoges (now Lycée Gay-Lussac), 1767
- Chapel of the Visitation, Limoges, 1771
- Rigoulene hotel, Saint-Léonard-de-Noblat, 1772
- The Boucher House, at the corner of streets golden Jug and the Consulate, Limoges, 1772
- Renovation and development of the general hospital of Limoges, Limoges, 1773
- Reconstruction of the church Notre-Dame,
- Argentre-du-plessis, 1775
- Renovation of the Church Saint-Sylvain, Ahun, 1775
- Château de Salvanet, Saint-Priest-Taurion, 1776
- Palace of the bishopric, Sées, 1778
- Convent of Providence, Limoges, 1779
- Renovation and development of the Cathedral Notre-Dame de Sées, Sées, 1780
- Château de Faye, Flavignac, 1782
- Convent of Augustins, Mortemart, 1785
- Château de Lavergne, Saint-Priest-Ligoure, 1785
- Redevelopment of the choir of the Cathedral of Saint-Étienne de Limoges, Limoges, 1788
- Château de Guéret, current Museum of the Sénatorerie

== Gallery ==
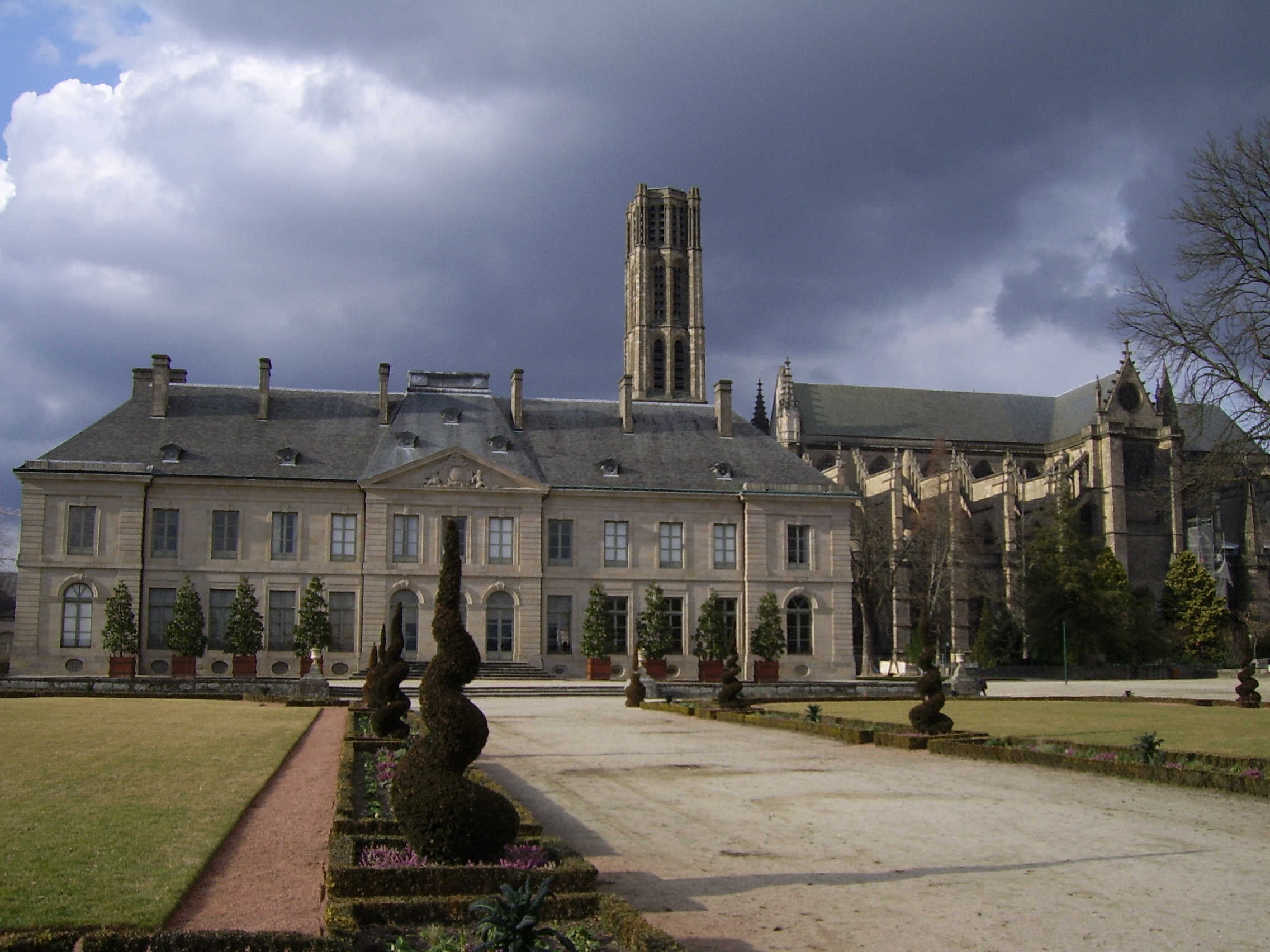
Palais de l'évêché à Limoges.

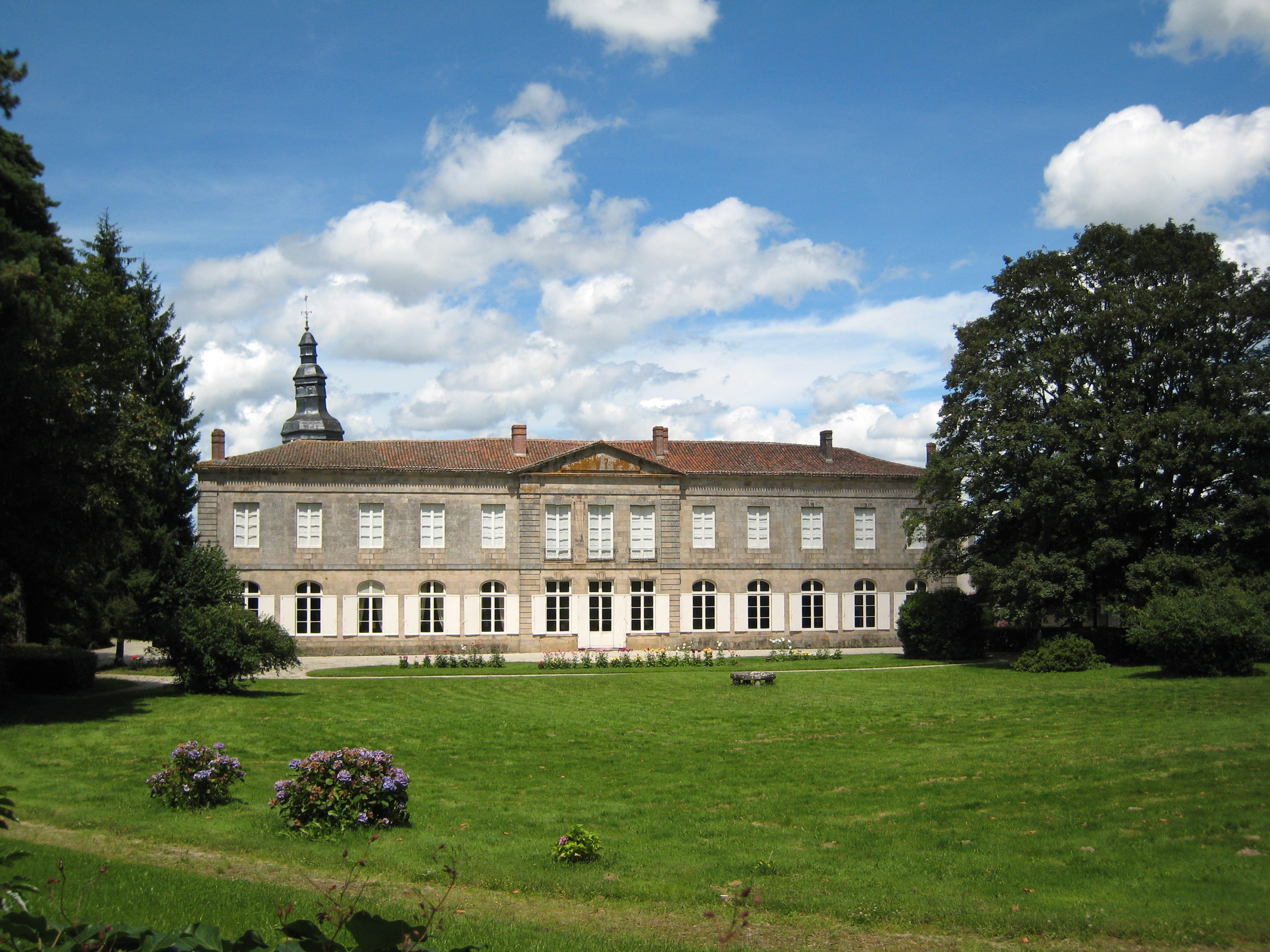
Couvent des Augustins à Mortemart.

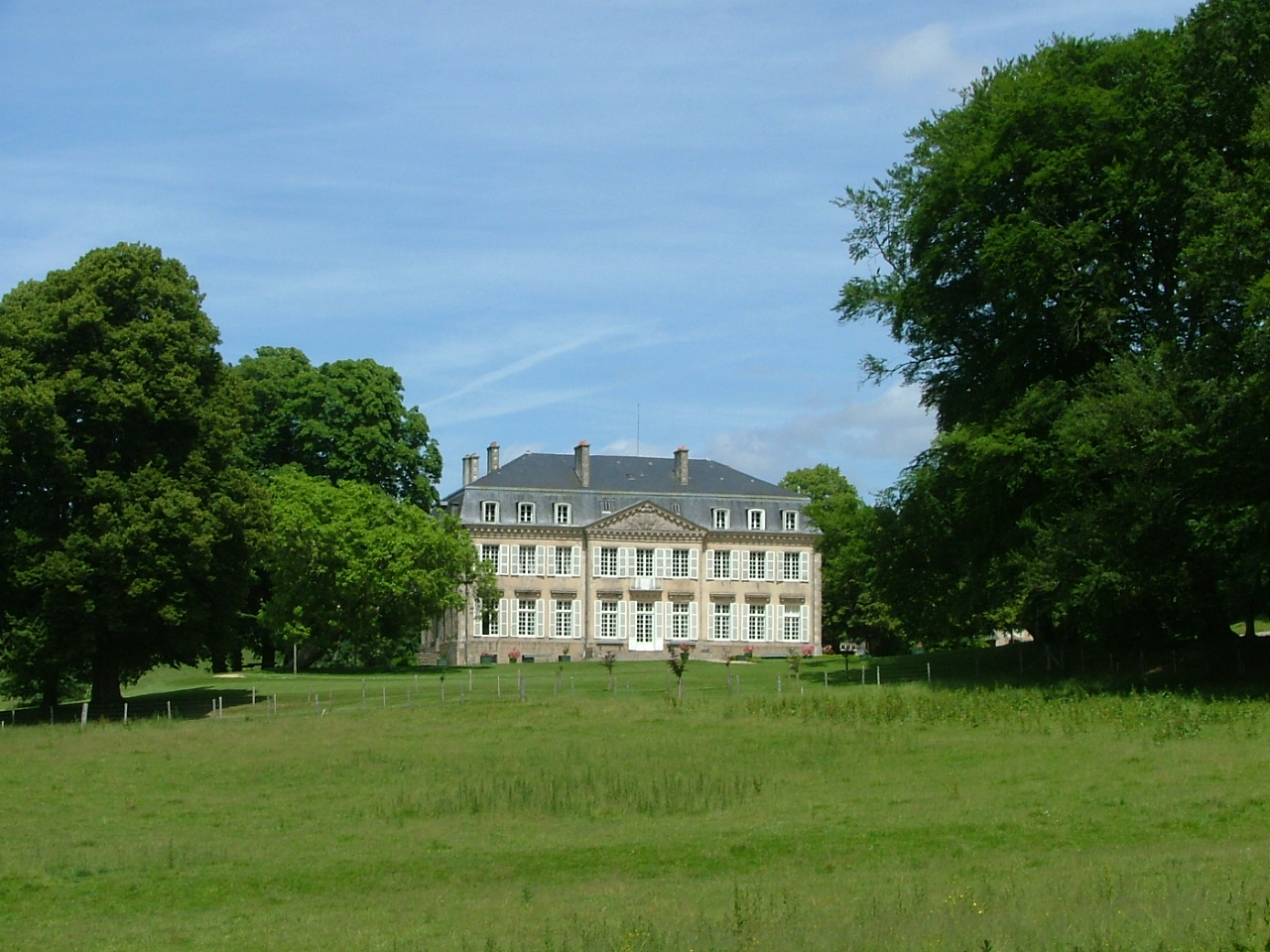
Château de Salvanet à St-Priest-Taurion.

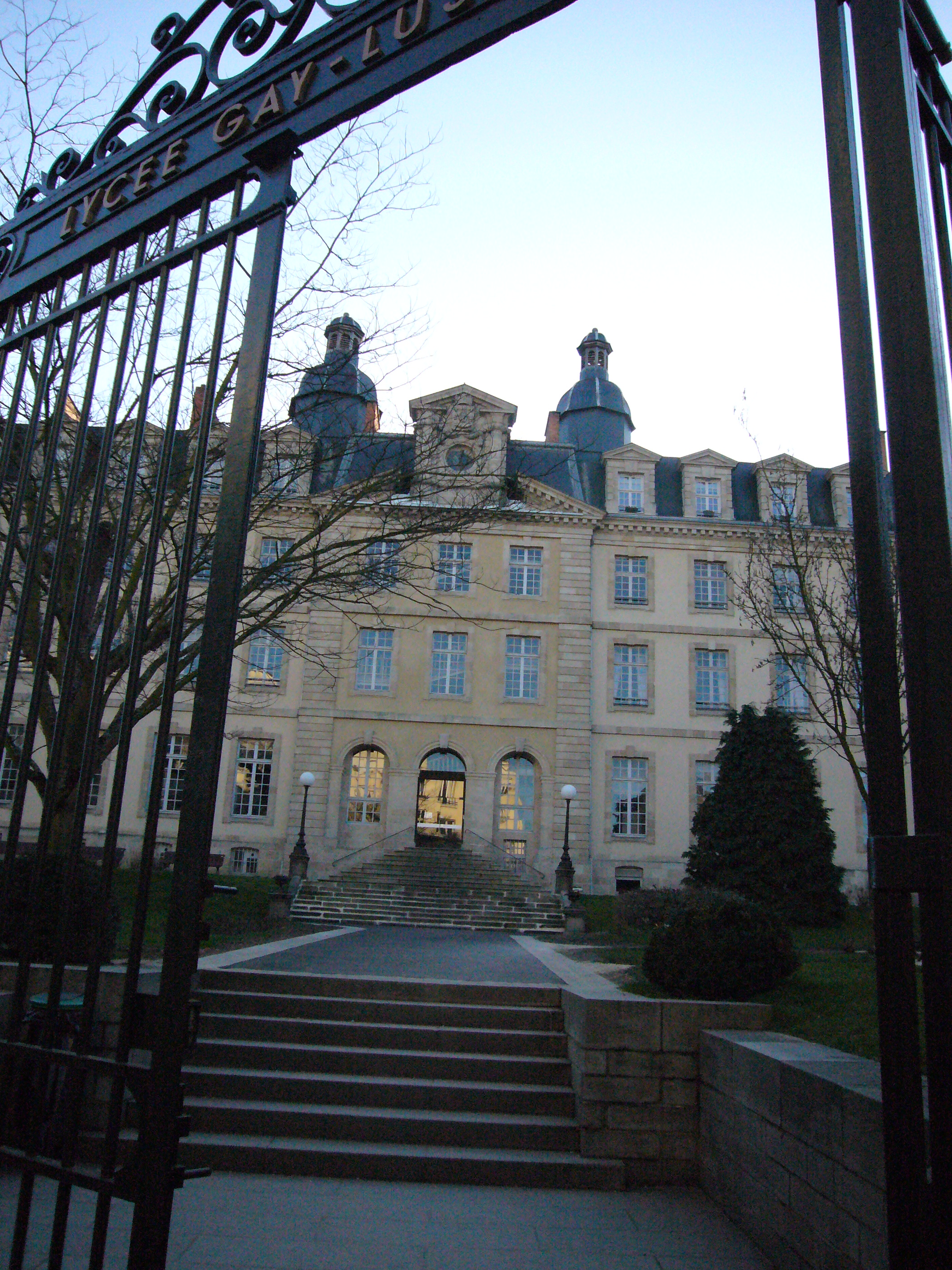
Façade du Lycée Gay-Lussac à Limoges.
