= Christa Brosseau =

Canadian chemist

- Title: Associate Professor and Canada Research Chair

Academic background
- Education: Dalhousie University
- Alma mater: University of Guelph
- Thesis: Electrochemical and PM-IRRAS studies of Cholera toxin binding at a model biological membrane (2007)
- Doctoral advisor: Jacek Lipkowski

Academic work
- Discipline: Chemistry
- Institutions: Saint Mary's University, Northwestern University, Dalhousie University, University of Guelph
- Main interests: electrochemistry, surface-enhanced Raman spectroscopy
- Website: https://www.brosseaulab.com/

Christa L. Brosseau is a Canadian chemist, currently a Canada Research Chair at Saint Mary's University (Halifax). Brosseau's research focus is on Electrochemical Surface-Enhanced Raman Spectroscopy.

== Early career and education ==
Brosseau was born in Halifax, Nova Scotia, and received a B.Sc. degree in chemistry from Dalhousie University and a MSc degree in 2003 under the supervision of Prof. Sharon Roscoe at Acadia University for studying the adsorption of proteins on metallic surfaces using electrochemical methods.

=== Graduate studies ===
In 2007, Brosseau completed a PhD at the University of Guelph under the supervision of Prof. Jacek Lipkowski on a project which involved using electrochemistry and infrared spectroscopy to probe the interaction of cholera toxin with a model biological membrane supported on an electrode surface.

=== Postdoctoral studies ===
In 2007, Brosseau received an Andrew W. Mellon Foundation postdoctoral fellowship to work at Northwestern University under the supervision of Prof. Richard P. Van Duyne, in collaboration with the Art Institute of Chicago. This project used surface-enhanced Raman spectroscopy (SERS) to analyze colorants in historical textiles and paintings.

== Research ==
In 2009, Brosseau joined the Chemistry department at Saint Mary's University as an assistant professor, and was promoted to associate professor in 2014. Brosseau was named the Canada Research Chair in Sustainable Chemistry and Materials in 2016.

The Brosseau research lab investigates the spectra observed when nanoparticles interact with light, to develop green molecular sensors. A green synthesis of silver nanoparticles improved their surface-enhanced Raman spectroscopy. Electrochemical surface-enhanced Raman spectroscopy (EC-SERS) was useful for analyzing non-heme protein adsorption at electrified interfaces. The loading of gold nanoparticles onto nitrocellulose membranes was enhanced using vertical flow, achieving greater and more consistent signal.

Brossard's early achievements include developing a rapid and precise analytical method for detecting uric acid in urine using EC-SERS for routine diagnosis of early eclampsia and the rapid detection of melamine in milk using a portable and affordable EC-SERS system. The SERS of turmeric allowed its detection at very low concentrations in historic pastels from the painter Mary Cassatt.

== Awards and honors ==
- 2017–2022 Canada Research Chair in Sustainable Chemistry and Materials
- 2018 Anderson Award Lecturer at Memorial University
- 2019 President’s Award for Excellence in Research, St. Mary's University
- Electrochemical Society (ECS) – Vice-Chairperson of Canadian section

== See also ==
- Quartz crystal nanobalance (QCN)
