= Hedden =

Hedden is a surname. Notable people with the surname include:

- Gilbert Hedden, member of Oak Island treasure hunt
- Glenn Hedden, American football coach
- Mike Hedden, hockey player
- Rob Hedden, American writer and film director
- Tom Hedden, score composer

== See also ==
- Hedden Construction Company
- Hedden County Park
- Hedden Iron Construction Company
- Lisa Heddens, Iowa State Representative
- Mount Hedden
- Nix v. Hedden
