= Home Economics Building (Vanderbilt University) =

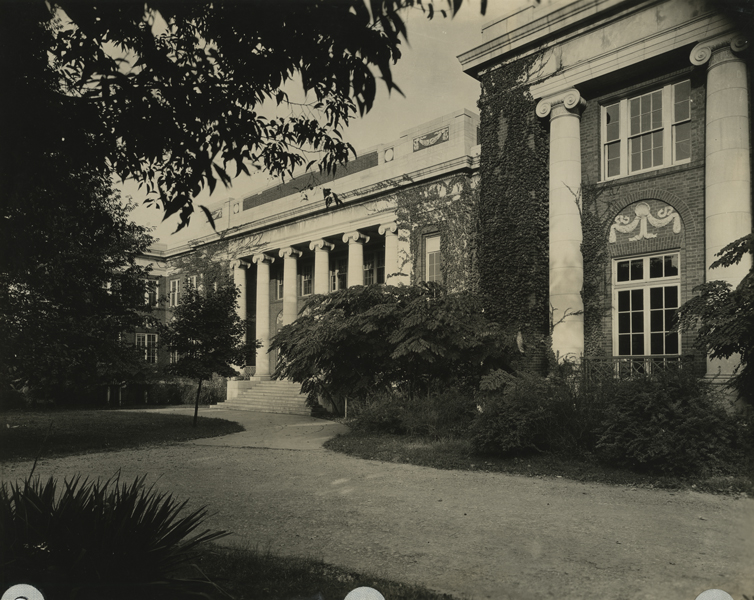
- Home Economics Building

- Location within Tennessee

General information
- Location: 134 Magnolia Circle Nashville, Tennessee
- Coordinates: 36°8′35.22″N 86°47′50.94″W
- Completed: 1912

Technical details
- Floor area: 29,588 Square Feet

Design and construction
- Architect: Ludlow and Peabody

The Home Economics Building on the campus of Vanderbilt University is a historic structure in Nashville, Tennessee.

== Architecture and design ==
One of the first two buildings built on the new Peabody College campus in 1912, the Home Economics Building (29,588 sq. ft.) is mirrored by its twin the Industrial Arts Building, now called Mayborn Hall. Initially referred to as the Household Arts Building, it was built by the New York firm the Hedden Construction Company and designed by Ludlow and Peabody Architects. It opened for classes in the summer of 1914.

Although not as elaborate as the Industrial Arts Building the Home Economics Building does sport marble floors and exterior elements of design that reflect the domestic work for which the building was to be used. The red brick structure, the columns of the building as well as the decorative swag elements over the front windows perpetuate the style desired by President Bruce R. Payne and the Executive Committee of the Board of Trust, one that is reflective of the University of Virginia campus where President Payne had attended college Subsequent buildings were styled in the same manner though not as elaborately.

A small greenhouse (512 sq. ft.) built at the same time as the structure is attached to the building and still is in use. In 1993 the building was renovated eliminating the laboratories, expanding the classrooms and creating more faculty offices.

== Use ==
Originally conceived of as a home for the study of Domestic Arts and housing two laboratories the Home Economics Building has seen what is taught within its walls change dramatically through the years. Rooms that taught the science of nutrition and elements of home canning have made way for classes on human development and psychology.

In 1916, due to a lack of a proper library, the Home Economics Building housed 20,000 books in its Assembly Room with the overflow of books being stored in the Boiler Room of the Industrial Arts Building.
