= Saratoga Springs Visitor Center =

- The Drinkhall
- U.S. National Register of Historic Places
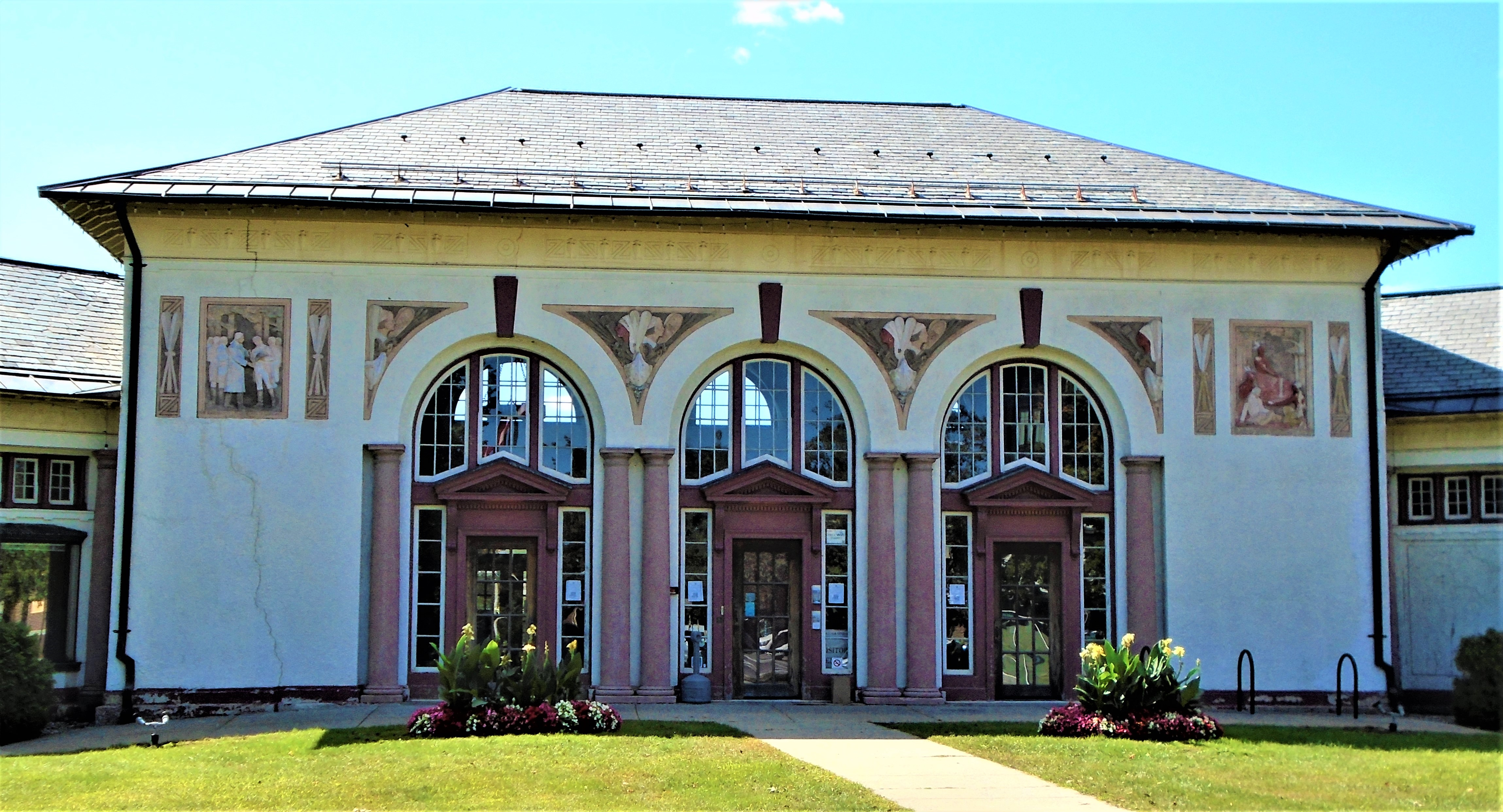
- (2020)

- Location within New York Location within the United States
- Location: 297 Broadway, Saratoga Springs, New York
- Coordinates: 43°5′6″N 73°47′45″W
- Built: 1915
- Built by: James Gaffeney
- Architect: Ludlow and Peabody
- Architectural style: Beaux Arts
- NRHP reference No.: 74001302
- Added to NRHP: November 20, 1974

The Saratoga Springs Visitor Center, located at 297 Broadway in Saratoga Springs, Saratoga County, New York, in the building known historically as "The Drinkhall", was built in 1915 as a trolley station by the Hudson Valley Railroad. It was designed by Ludlow and Peabody in the Beaux Arts style.

The building consists of four sections. The three-bay, stuccoed central block is flanked by lower 1 1/2-story, three-bay wings. The rear section has an open porch that served as the trolley platform. It is constructed of hollow red clay tile and topped by a slate hipped roof. The building features a decorative frieze with arrowhead motifs and decorative panels in the Beaux-Arts style. The interior of the central block features a high barrel vault ceiling.

The Drinkhall was listed on the National Register of Historic Places in 1974.
