= 229 West 43rd Street =

Office skyscraper in Manhattan, New York

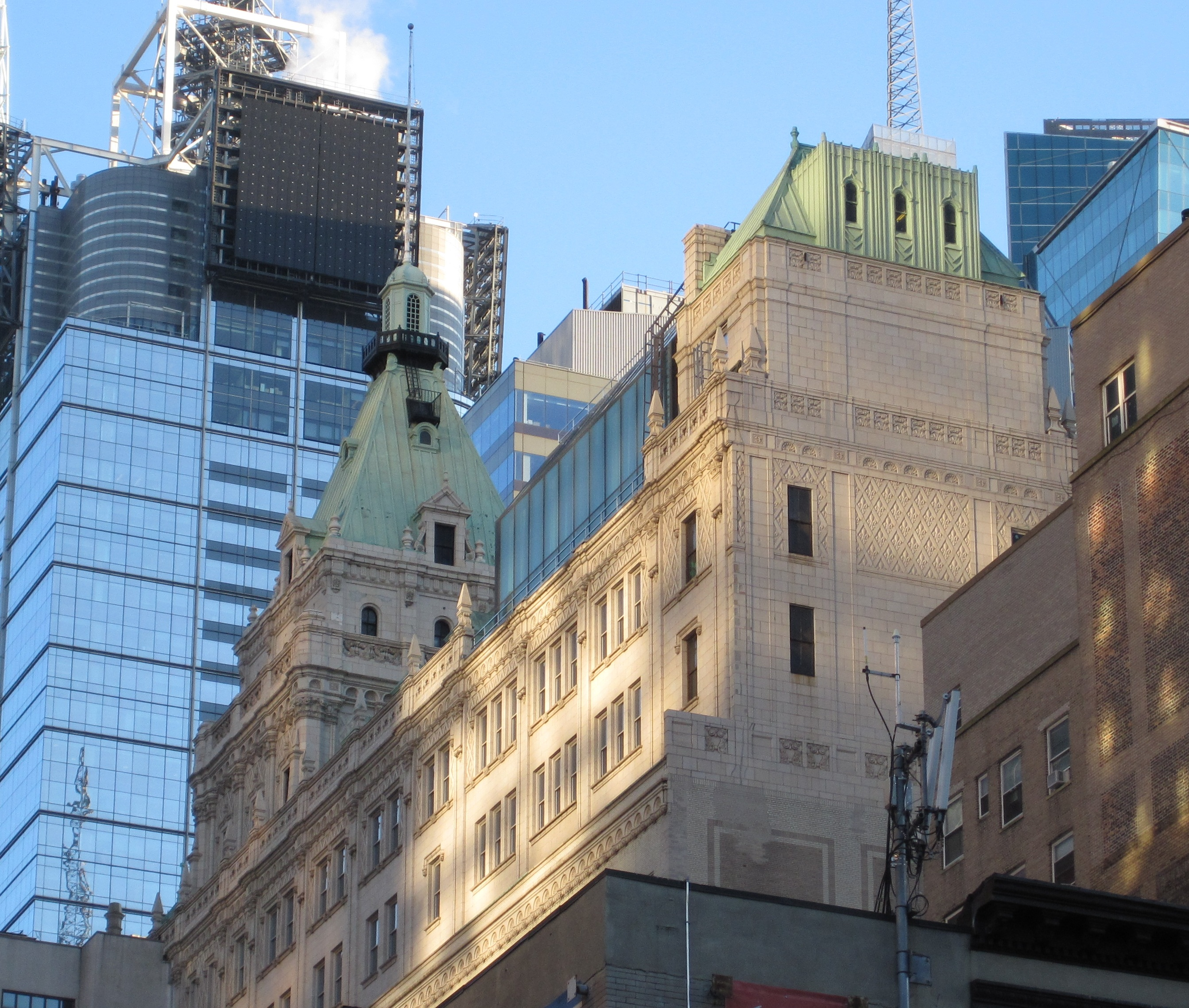
- Upper floors of building (December 2009)
- Former names: New York Times Annex; The New York Times Building; Times Square Building

General information
- Type: Office
- Architectural style: Neo-Gothic; French Renaissance
- Location: 229 West 43rd Street; Manhattan, New York City
- Coordinates: 40°45′27″N 73°59′16″W
- Construction started: 1912
- Completed: August 1913 (eastern section on 43rd Street)
- Opening: February 2, 1913
- Renovated: 1922–1924 (addition; central section on 43rd Street and attic); 1931–1932 (addition; western section on 43rd Street); 1944–1947 (addition; section on 44th Street)
- Owner: Columbia Property Trust (offices); Kushner Companies (retail)
- Operator: Columbia Property Trust

Height
- Roof: 267 ft (81 m)

Technical details
- Floor count: 18
- Floor area: 767,000 sq ft (71,300 m^{2})

Design and construction
- Architects: Mortimer J. Fox (original); Ludlow and Peabody (1922 addition); Albert Kahn (1931–1932 addition); Shreve, Lamb & Harmon (1944–1947 addition)
- Developer: The New York Times Company
- Main contractor: George A. Fuller Company; Cauldwell Wingate Company

New York City Landmark
- Designated: April 24, 2001
- Reference no.: 2091

229 West 43rd Street (formerly The New York Times Building, The New York Times Annex, and the Times Square Building) is an 18-story office building in the Theater District of Midtown Manhattan, New York City, New York, U.S. Opened in 1913 and expanded in three stages, it was the headquarters of The New York Times newspaper until 2007. The original building by Mortimer J. Fox of Buchman & Fox stands on 43rd Street, as do a 1920s addition by Ludlow & Peabody and a 1930s addition by Albert Kahn. Shreve, Lamb & Harmon designed a wing on 44th Street in the 1940s. Columbia Property Trust owns most of the structure as an office building while Kushner Companies owns the lowest four floors as a retail and entertainment complex.

The 43rd Street sections of the building are designed in the French Gothic, French Renaissance, and Italian Renaissance styles and are a New York City designated landmark. The original building and its additions rise 11 stories from the street, except for a four-story wing on the eastern end of the site. The 43rd Street sections of the building are topped by a set-back five-story attic, interrupted by a seven-story tower with a pyramidal hip roof. The facade is constructed of light-colored Indiana limestone, brick, and terracotta and is divided horizontally into a two-story base, a nine-story midsection, and the attic and tower stories. The elevations are divided into vertical bays with a mixture of single windows, double windows, and arches. The building contains 770,000 square feet (72,000 m^{2}) of office space and 100,000 ft^{2} (9,300 m^{2}) of retail space. Originally, each floor was devoted to a different division of the Times.

Due to overcrowding at the previous Times headquarters at One Times Square, the Times Annex was constructed to supplement the paper's printing plant and other mechanical divisions. The annex became the Times's headquarters shortly after opening. As the Times's circulation expanded and its issues grew longer, the building was expanded in 1922–1924, 1931–1932, and 1944–1947. The Times relocated its printing plant from the building in 1997 and announced plans for new headquarters two years later, relocating in June 2007. A partnership led by Tishman Speyer bought the building in 2004 and sold it three years later to AFI USA, which had trouble finding office tenants and sold the upper floors to The Blackstone Group in 2011. AFI USA operated the retail portion of the building until 2015, when Columbia acquired the offices and Kushner bought the retail.

== Site ==
The former New York Times Building is at 229 West 43rd Street, on the north sidewalk between Eighth Avenue and Seventh Avenue, near Times Square in the Theater District of Midtown Manhattan, New York City, New York, U.S. The land lot is L-shaped, extending northward to 44th Street on the eastern half of the block. The lot covers 50,637 ft^{2} (4,704.3 m^{2}), with a frontage of 318 ft (97 m) on 43rd Street and a depth of 200.84 ft (61 m). In 1996, the city renamed the block of 43rd Street outside the building in honor of Adolph Ochs, a former publisher of The New York Times, the building's longtime occupant.

The surrounding area is part of Manhattan's Theater District and contains many Broadway theatres. 229 West 43rd Street shares the city block with St. James Theatre, the Hayes Theater, and Sardi's restaurant to the northwest on 44th Street; 1501 Broadway to the east; and 255 West 43rd Street to the west on 43rd Street. Across 44th Street are the Majestic, Broadhurst, John Golden, Bernard B. Jacobs, and Gerald Schoenfeld theaters to the northwest; the Shubert and Booth theaters to the north; and One Astor Plaza to the northeast. The Times Square Theatre, New Victory Theater, and 3 Times Square are directly across 43rd Street to the southeast, while the former Hotel Carter, American Airlines Theatre, and Lyric Theatre are to the south.

The building was developed as an annex structure for The New York Times. Prior to the New York Times Annex's development, the site was part of the Astor family estate and contained several brownstone townhouses. The easternmost section of the building was built on two land lots owned by the Astors: a 100 by 100 ft (30 by 30 m) lot that had been leased by the Shubert family, as well a 100 by 43 ft (30 by 13 m) lot. The central section was acquired in 1915 and replaced five buildings of five stories each, taking up a square site measuring 100 by 100 feet. The westernmost section, measuring 75 by 100 ft (23 by 30 m), was acquired in 1928 and formerly contained a six-story apartment hotel named Yandis Court.

== Architecture ==
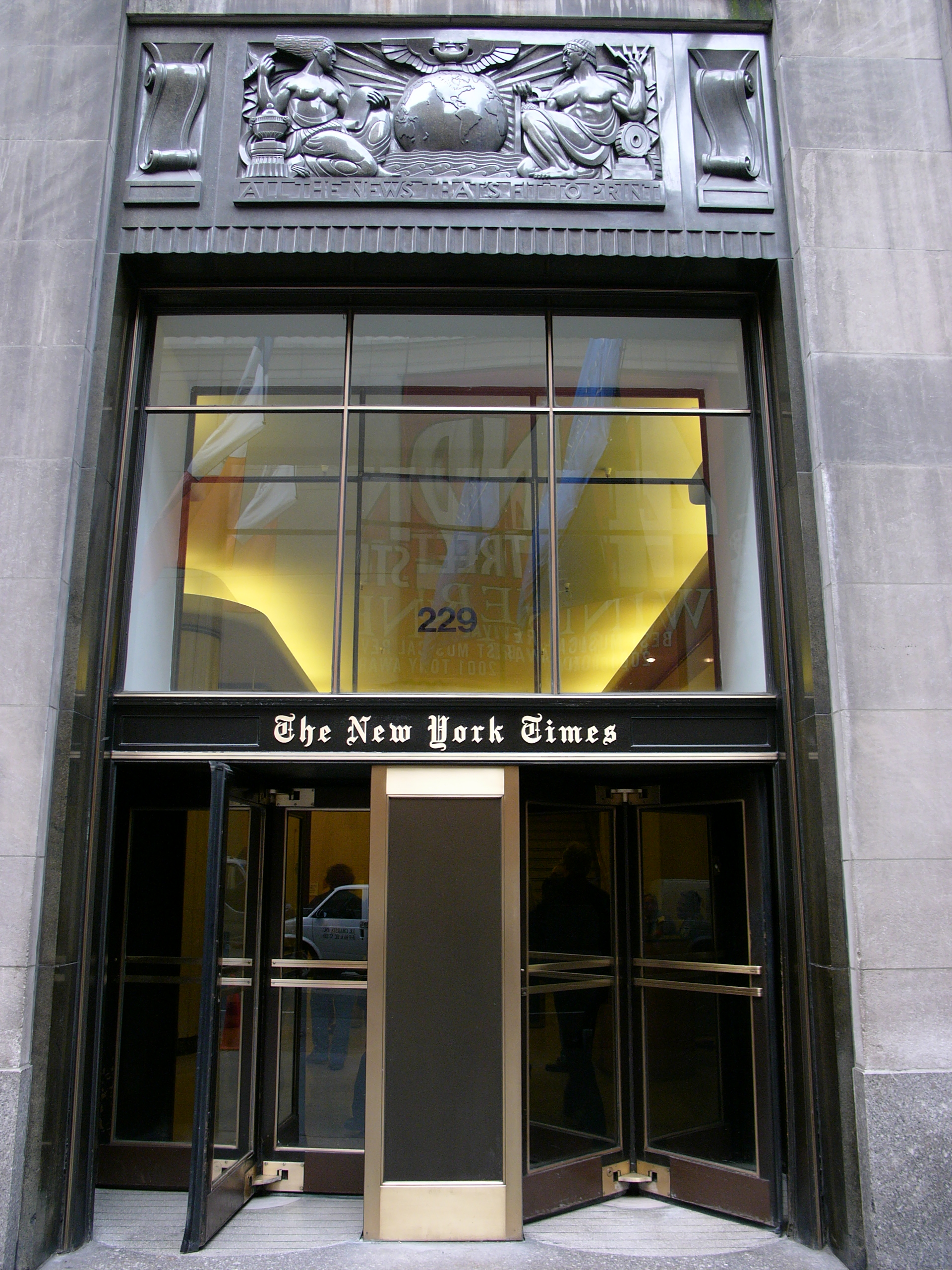
Entrance

229 West 43rd Street was originally known as the New York Times Annex and was built in four stages. The 43rd Street sections of the building are designed in the French Gothic, French Renaissance, and Italian Renaissance styles. The eastern third of the site was designed in 1912 by Mortimer J. Fox of Buchman & Fox. From 1922 to 1924, Ludlow and Peabody designed the central section as well as the attic stories. Albert Kahn designed the western section in 1931, including a second lobby and rooftop studio. A fourth section to the north was designed in 1947 by Shreve, Lamb & Harmon.

The George A. Fuller Company was the general contractor for the original section of the building, as well as for the central section on 43rd Street. The Cauldwell Wingate Company built the westernmost section on 43rd Street. Several other contractors were involved in the construction, including ironwork contractor Sexauer and Lemke.

=== Form ===
The massing of 229 West 43rd Street is composed of several sections. The extreme eastern end of the site is only four stories high and is part of Fox's original design. Most of the building is 11 stories tall and was developed during all three periods of the building's construction. The 11-story section is topped by a five-story attic designed by Ludlow and Peabody, which is set back on all sides. A seven-story tower, also designed by Ludlow and Peabody, rises above the 11th floor between the central and eastern parts of the building. This gave the building the appearance of a chateau with a tower. After the first expansion in 1924, an account by the New York Times Company described the building as measuring 399 ft 6 in (121.77 m) from the lowest basement to the pinnacle of the rooftop flagpole. However, according to Emporis, the building's pinnacle is 267 ft (81 m) tall.

Shreve, Lamb & Harmon's wing along 44th Street is 11 stories tall. The portion of the building on 43rd Street is a New York City designated landmark, but the 44th Street section is not protected by a landmark designation.

=== Facade ===
The facade is constructed of light-colored Indiana limestone, brick, and terracotta. The southern and eastern elevations were decorated elaborately, since they could readily be seen from Broadway. The original section of the building contains one-over-one sash windows, while the expansions contain three-over-three or six-over-six sash windows. In all three sections, the windows originally had steel frames. Some of the original windows remain, while others have been replaced with those containing aluminum or steel frames.

==== Base ====
On 43rd Street, the first two stories are made of rusticated blocks of limestone. The ground level is divided into sixteen vertical bays, twelve of which contain segmental arches with rusticated voussoirs. The arches formerly contained loading docks, most of which were converted to storefronts in a 2006 renovation. The piers between each bay, which also date to the 2006 renovation, contain globe-shaped lamps. The second story has thirteen bays of windows, mostly corresponding with the ground-story arches; the easternmost bay corresponds to a doorway rather than an arch. Seven of these bays contain two windows with a shared window sill, while the other six bays have one window with a sill. (Note: At the second story, the 1st, 5th, and 14th through 17th bays from west are designed with one window rather than two. The 14th through 17th bays from west are the same as the four easternmost bays.) A frieze with a shell design, as well as a cornice, run above the second-story windows.

The bays containing the building's main entrance (the 8th to 11th bays from west) are designed in a different manner at the ground and second stories. The main entrance is off center and was previously three bays wide; the leftmost (8th) bay was added in 2006. The 9th and 10th bays contain doorways recessed into stone porticos. The 11th bay contains a revolving door surrounded by six windows at the ground level. The 8th bay is designed in a similar manner to the 11th bay. All four bays are separated by vertical pilasters and are flanked by elongated lamps. Within all the entrance bays, there are stone spandrel panels between the ground and second floors, as well as three triple-hung windows at the second floor. Two flagpoles hang from either of the 9th and 10th bays at the second floor. A sculpted gargoyle is placed between these two bays near the top of the second floor. Above this story is a frieze with reliefs, which contain a motif of two griffins flanking a shield.

At the extreme east end of the building, the four-story wing has a brick facade and three single-hung windows on either of the third and fourth stories. The lintels above each of the fourth-story windows have ogee moldings with finials at the center. There is a terracotta cornice and parapet above the fourth story; the cornice is held up by four corbels.

==== Midsection ====
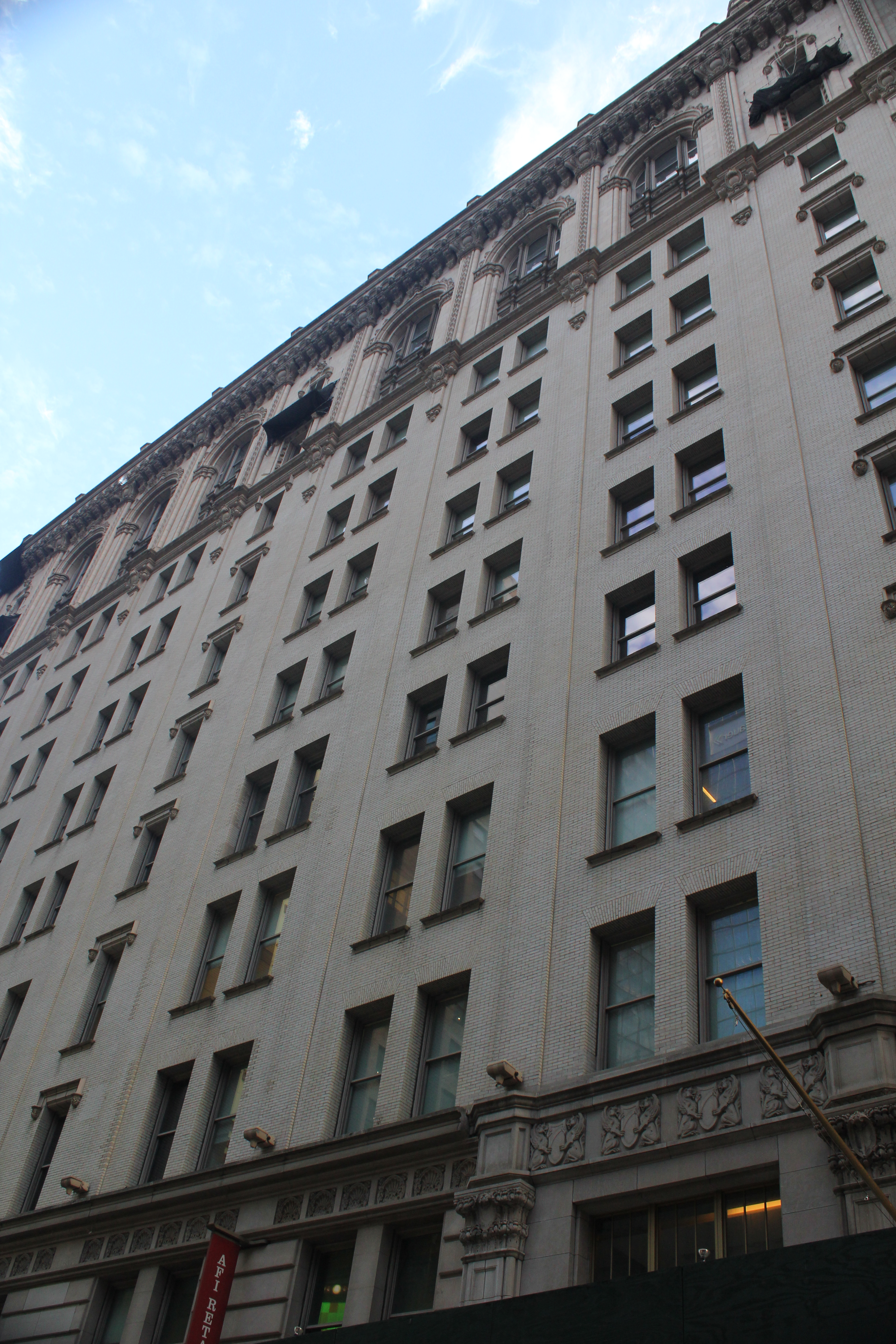
View of midsection

Across the south and east elevations, the third to ninth floors are clad in brick, while the 10th and 11th floors are faced in terracotta. The south and east elevations contain vertical pilasters with decorative capitals at the ninth story. There are 14 bays across the south elevation and five bays across the east elevation. The east elevation and the five easternmost bays of the south elevation are part of Fox's original design. The four westernmost bays of the south elevation are part of Kahn's 1932 addition, while the five bays in the center are part of Ludlow and Peabody's 1924 addition.

On the south elevation, most of the bays are separated by single pilasters. The 9th and 10th bays from west are separated by double pilasters; a sign hangs from the fourth floor in the space between the two pilasters. Originally, there was a clock in the space occupied by this sign, which was destroyed by fire and replaced in 1963 with a digital clock. In a 2008 renovation, the tower received a sign measuring 32 by 7 ft (9.8 by 2.1 m), as well as an analog clock face. On each story are five single windows with ogee moldings above them, as well as nine double windows without any moldings. (Note: On the third through eleventh stories, the 1st, 5th, 10th, 11th, and 14th bays are designed with one window per floor. The other bays are designed with two windows on each of the third through ninth stories, as well as arches on the tenth and eleventh stories.)

On the east elevation, the outer two bays are single openings while the inner three bays are double openings. These windows are similar to their counterparts on the south elevation and are all separated by single pilasters. Below the 11th story on the west elevation are blind openings and double- and triple-hung windows surrounded by dark brick. On the north elevation, the windows are grouped in threes and surrounded by light brick, with ogee moldings above the eleventh-story windows.

At the 10th and 11th floors, the south elevation contains nine arches and five bays of plain windows (corresponding to the bays with double and single windows respectively). The east elevation contains three arches in the center and two bays of plain windows on the outside. On both elevations, the arches are flanked by pilasters with tablet flowers. Each arch contains metal columns that divide it into thirds, as well as horizontal metal spandrels between the 10th and 11th stories. The plain bays have an unornamented window on the 10th story and a window with a balcony, ogee-molding lintel, and finial on the 11th story. Above the south and east elevations runs a frieze with shell motifs, as well as a terracotta cornice with brackets. The cornice is topped by a parapet, which contains relief panels alternating with pedestals. When the building was completed in 1913, there had been large signs on the facade.

==== Attic ====
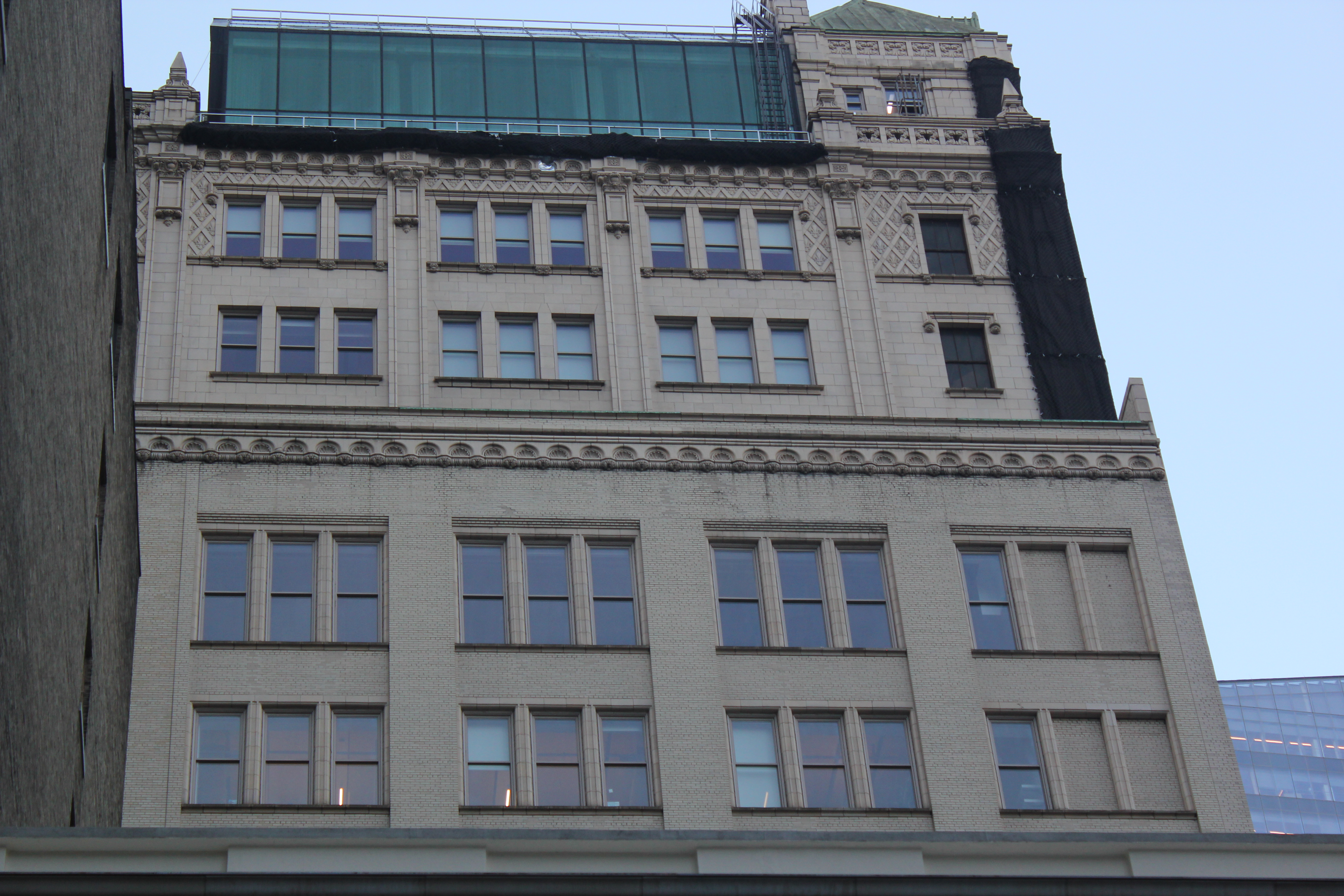
North elevation of attic

The attic is five stories high and is set back from the 11th story. On the north, south, and east elevations, there are single and double windows on the 12th and 13th floors. The western elevation only has single windows. At the top of the 14th floor are panels with diagonal bands and fleur-de-lis reliefs. These are topped by frieze and a terracotta cornice with brackets. Above the cornice is a parapet, which contains obelisks on pedestals. Part of the parapet's western section has been replaced with a small addition, containing a glass wall that faces north. Windows are also installed on the eastern end of the parapet. The 15th floor of the attic has dormer windows within a hip roof. There is a terracotta chimney on the eastern end of the roof as well.

The attic is interrupted by a seven-story tower, which separates the western two-thirds and the eastern third of the building. The tower is three bays wide and corresponds to the 9th and 10th bays on the southern elevation. At the 14th and 15th stories, the tower's center bay contained an arched opening, which has been closed up. The facade of the 15th and 16th stories contains diagonal bands and fleur-de-lis reliefs, and the 16th-story windows contain balconies, ogee moldings, and finials.

The tower sets back on all sides at the 17th story, with a terracotta parapet surrounding it, as well as three arched windows on each side. Above this is a pyramidal roof that is designed to appear as though it is covered in metal. From 1951 to the 1970s, the tower's elevations contained neon letters with the name of The New York Times, which measured 8 to 10 ft (2.4 to 3.0 m) high. At the 18th story, each elevation has a single dormer window, which contains scrolls and finials on either side and a triangular pediment on the top. Above the 18th story are round-arched dormer windows on each elevation, as well as a lantern with a railing at the pinnacle of the roof. The lantern initially contained a flagpole with the Times's flag on it, which contained blue text on a white background.

=== Mechanical features ===
Following the 1924 expansion, the building was served by two direct current feeders on 43rd Street and a third feeder from 44th Street. These provided power for the building's normal operation and all originated from different power stations, so the Times could continue printing in case one feeder was interrupted. Two switchboards were provided: a primary switchboard with a capacity of 5,000 amperes and a secondary one with a capacity of 1,500 amperes.

The Times Annex had extensive heating and ventilation systems when it was expanded in 1924. The heat was provided by four boilers, which could be powered either by coal bunkers with a capacity of 80 short tons (71 long tons; 73 t) or oil tanks with a capacity of 20,000 barrels. The heat was then distributed to the upper stories through 576 radiators. Thirteen indirect ventilation systems were installed, with a capacity of 200,000 ft^{3} (5,700 m^{3}) of air per minute for both intake and exhaust. There was also an ice-making plant in the basement, with a capacity of 7 tons, which served the building's drinking fountains, as well as a refrigeration plant on the eleventh floor for the employee dining rooms.

The building was served directly by the New York City water supply system. When the Annex was first completed in 1913, the municipal water supply could provide 500 U.S. gallons (1,900 L) a minute; following the 1924 expansion, this was increased to 1,500 U.S. gal (5,700 L) per minute. Water from these pipes was collected in the sub-basement level, then pumped to a house supply tank. When the Times Annex was completed in 1913, the original fire-protection system had tanks with a capacity of 20,000 U.S. gal (76,000 L). After the 1924 expansion, the building's sprinkler system was expanded to four tanks with 30,000 U.S. gal (110,000 L) each, as well as a reserve tank of 3,500 U.S. gal (13,000 L). The building's drainage system had two sump pumps and two sewage ejectors; they could collectively drain up to 800 U.S. gal (3,000 L) per minute.

=== Interior ===
The building originally covered either 144,000 ft^{2} (13,400 m^{2}) or 170,000 ft^{2} (16,000 m^{2}). The four lowest floors each had 11,722 ft^{2} (1,089.0 m^{2}) and the top seven floors had 8,280 ft^{2} (769 m^{2}). After it was expanded in 1924, the building had about 318,000 ft^{2} (29,500 m^{2}). When the third expansion was completed in 1947, the building had a floor area of 637,841 ft^{2} (59,257.4 m^{2}), excluding mezzanines. Following all of its expansions, 229 West 43rd Street has had 750,000 ft^{2} (70,000 m^{2}) of office space, with 65,000 ft^{2} (6,000 m^{2}) on a typical floor below the attic. The superstructure of the building includes densely spaced structural columns, which made it hard to lease after the Times moved out.

There were seven passenger elevators following the 1924 expansion. This count remained largely unchanged in later years; the Times reported in 1973 that its building had eight passenger elevators. A freight elevator was at the eastern end of the building and traveled between the ground-floor loading dock and the sub-basement; it was used exclusively to transport paper. An additional freight elevator, at the western end of the central section, traveled between the fourth floor and sub-basement. There were various lifts and conveyor belts to carry plates and prints throughout the building. Twenty conveyors also transported papers from the presses to the mail room or its mezzanine.

==== Times facilities ====
Originally, each floor was devoted to a different purpose. Issues were printed in the basement, and the mail and delivery departments were housed on the ground floor. The second floor contained the business department; the third floor housed the news department, telegraph room, and telephone switchboard; and the fourth floor was used as a composing room. The fifth floor contained employee showers, a dining room, kitchen, and doctor's office. The sixth and eighth floors were reserved for future use, while the seventh floor was used for photoengraving. The ninth floor had the Sunday Times department; the tenth floor had an editorial division and library; and the eleventh floor had executive offices, including those of Times publisher Adolph Ochs. After 1924, the employee room was relocated to the 5th to the 10th floor, and the executive offices were relocated from the 11th to the 14th floor.

The basement of the original section of the building rests on 30 steel columns, which were designed to hold the printing presses. When the building opened in 1913, it could print 372,000 sixteen-page issues per hour, compared to 54,000 per hour at the Times Tower. The basement originally had four sextuple presses, which were used to print the Times's regular editions, and an octuple press, which was used for high-grade printing and electrotype plates. After the first expansion in 1924, the basement had sixteen sextuple presses and four octuple presses, which could print 480,000 issues per hour, with 24 to 32 pages per issue. Also in the basement was a stereotype room; a reel room with sixty magazine reels; a machine shop; and an electricians' shop. Yet another sextuple press was installed in the second expansion in 1932, with a capacity of 50,000 issues per hour. There was also a sub-basement, which contained storage space for paper and the presses' reels, as well as a pump room and boiler room. A switchboard was placed on a mezzanine level above the basement.

The ground level had a neo-Gothic entrance, three loading docks, two storefronts, and a passageway leading to Weber and Fields' Music Hall (later the 44th Street Theatre). The loading docks led to a freight hall with a brick floor, measuring 58 by 35 ft (18 by 11 m). The freight hall was used by paper trucks to deliver paper to the sub-basement, as well as by the delivery department, which loaded issues onto paper trucks for distribution. The printing plant closed in 1997, and the ground floor and basement have since been converted to retail. Among the retail tenants are a two-level Bowlmor Lanes bowling alley with 50 lanes.

From 1950 to 1989, the ninth and tenth floors housed the studios for radio stations WQXR and WQXR-FM. These studios were accessed by a reception area on the tenth floor, which contained the executive offices of the stations. A staircase with bronze railings led to the ninth floor, which led to the studios, recording rooms, control rooms, music department, and music library. Glass walls on the ninth floor overlooked the studios, which ranged in size from 10 by 12 ft (3.0 by 3.7 m) to 20 by 36 ft (6.1 by 11.0 m). These studios were designed with non-parallel walls, multi-tiered ceilings, double-glass windows, and soundproof doors. There was also an auditorium on the ninth floor between the early 1950s and 1999. Other facilities included a test kitchen on the ninth floor for the food department of the Times.

== History ==
The New York Times, founded in 1851, was first housed in 113 Nassau Street in Lower Manhattan. It moved to 138 Nassau Street, the site of what is now the Potter Building, in 1854. The Times moved to a neighboring five-story edifice at 41 Park Row in 1858. Partially prompted by the development of the neighboring New York Tribune Building, the Times replaced its building in 1889 with a new 13-story building at the same site, one that remains in use by Pace University with some modifications. The surrounding section of Park Row was known as New York City's "Newspaper Row" in the 19th and early 20th centuries. In 1905, the paper moved to One Times Square, also known as the Times Tower, at 42nd Street and Broadway. The area surrounding the new headquarters was renamed from Longacre Square to Times Square.

=== Construction and opening ===
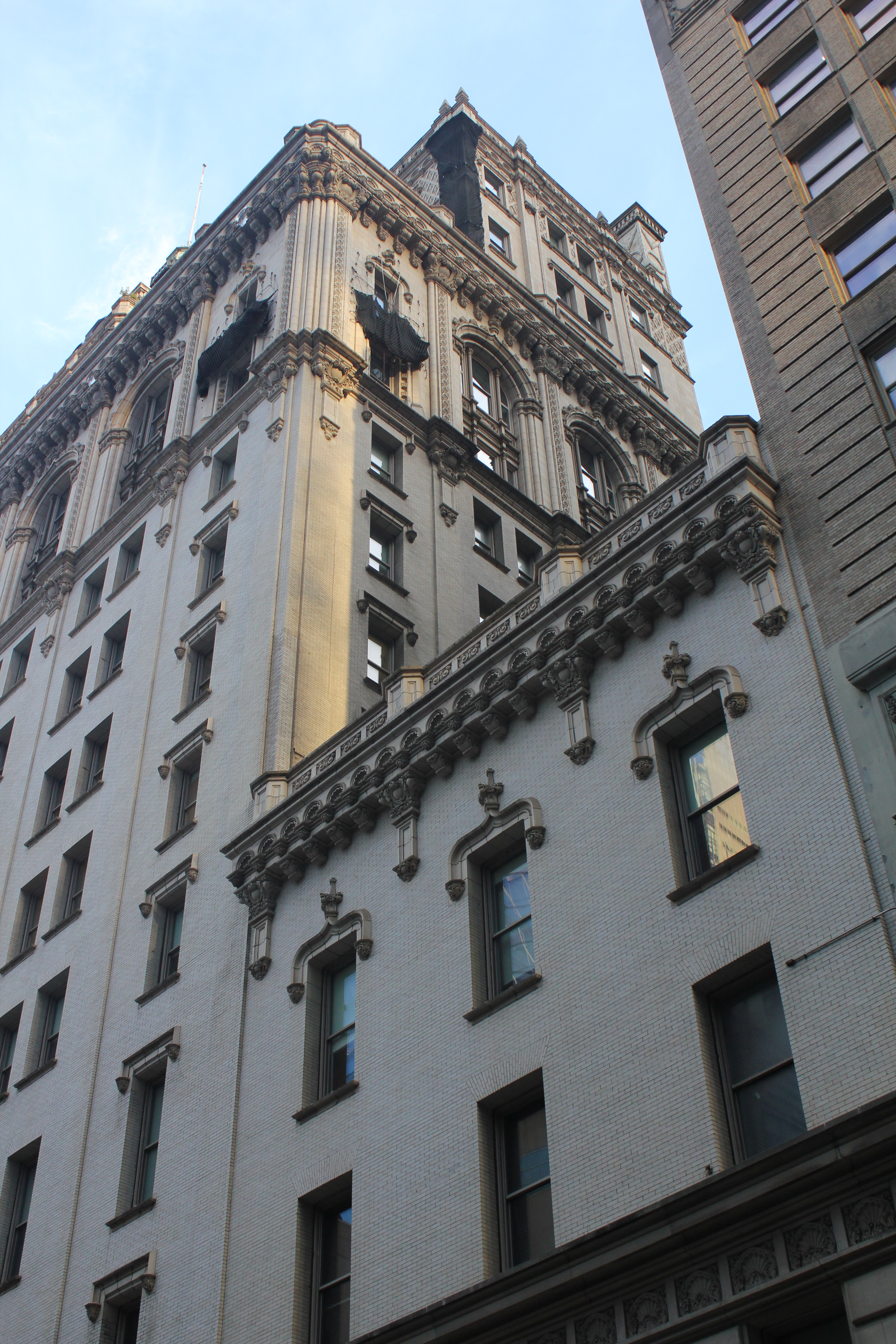
Original section of the building, including the four-story wing on 43rd Street

The Times had outgrown the slender Times Tower within a decade. One Times Square had a relatively small trapezoidal footprint and occupied its whole city block. There was so little space on the Times Tower site that its mechanical basements had to descend as much as 65 ft (20 m). Meanwhile, the Times Square area had become densely developed with restaurants, theaters, hotels, and office buildings. Despite the dearth of space, a Times booklet said: "It did not occur to anyone to suggest that the [Times] should desert Times Square." Accordingly, the Times bought the fee for 221–229 West 43rd Street, as well as the leasehold for 217–219 West 43rd Street, from theatrical operator Lee Shubert in March 1911. This gave the paper a site measuring 143 by 100 ft (44 by 30 m). The Times intended to erect a building on the site, called the "Times Annex", for its printing presses and other mechanical functions. This building would be designed by Mortimer J. Fox. Late that year, in a special issue celebrating the paper's 60th anniversary, an unnamed reporter wrote of the new building's design: "No one will be able to doubt after the most cursory glance that the Times Building and its Annex are related".

Work commenced in April 1912, and the New York Times Company received a $600,000 building loan for the project. By that June, the building had topped out and the walls were up to the tenth floor. A flag with The New York Times's name was hoisted onto the roof, 251 ft (77 m) above street level. The building was 11 stories tall with a four-story wing to the east, giving the impression of a "mounted tower". The Times relocated into the new building on February 2, 1913, and all work was completed that August. The Times Annex was connected to the Times Tower by a 400 ft-long (120 m) duct under 43rd Street. Most of the Times's operations quickly moved to the annex, except for the publishing and subscription divisions, and the space in the Times Tower was leased out.

=== Growth ===
==== 1910s and 1920s ====
Shortly after the annex was completed, the Times recorded an average daily circulation of 230,360 in October 1913. A Times retrospective called the Times Annex "the largest, finest, and most completely equipped newspaper home in North America" when it was completed. The Times soon became Times Square's largest employer, with 600 employees at the annex by the mid-1910s. All of the building's floors were occupied by 1915. At the end of that year, the New York Times Company bought five townhouses at 231–239 West 43rd Street from A. Fillmore Hyde. The Times then relocated some offices into these houses. The paper's daily circulation increased considerably, exceeding 300,000 by 1921. (Note: The New York Times Company recorded the paper's daily circulation as having grown to 348,607 by 1921, although the New York City Landmarks Preservation Commission (LPC) cited a value of 331,000.) The size of weekday issues also grew after World War I; whereas the average issue was 24 pages long before and during the war, issues had grown to between 28 and 40 pages afterward. Despite this, the Times wanted to continue publishing in Times Square, even as its competitors developed publishing plants on cheaper land.

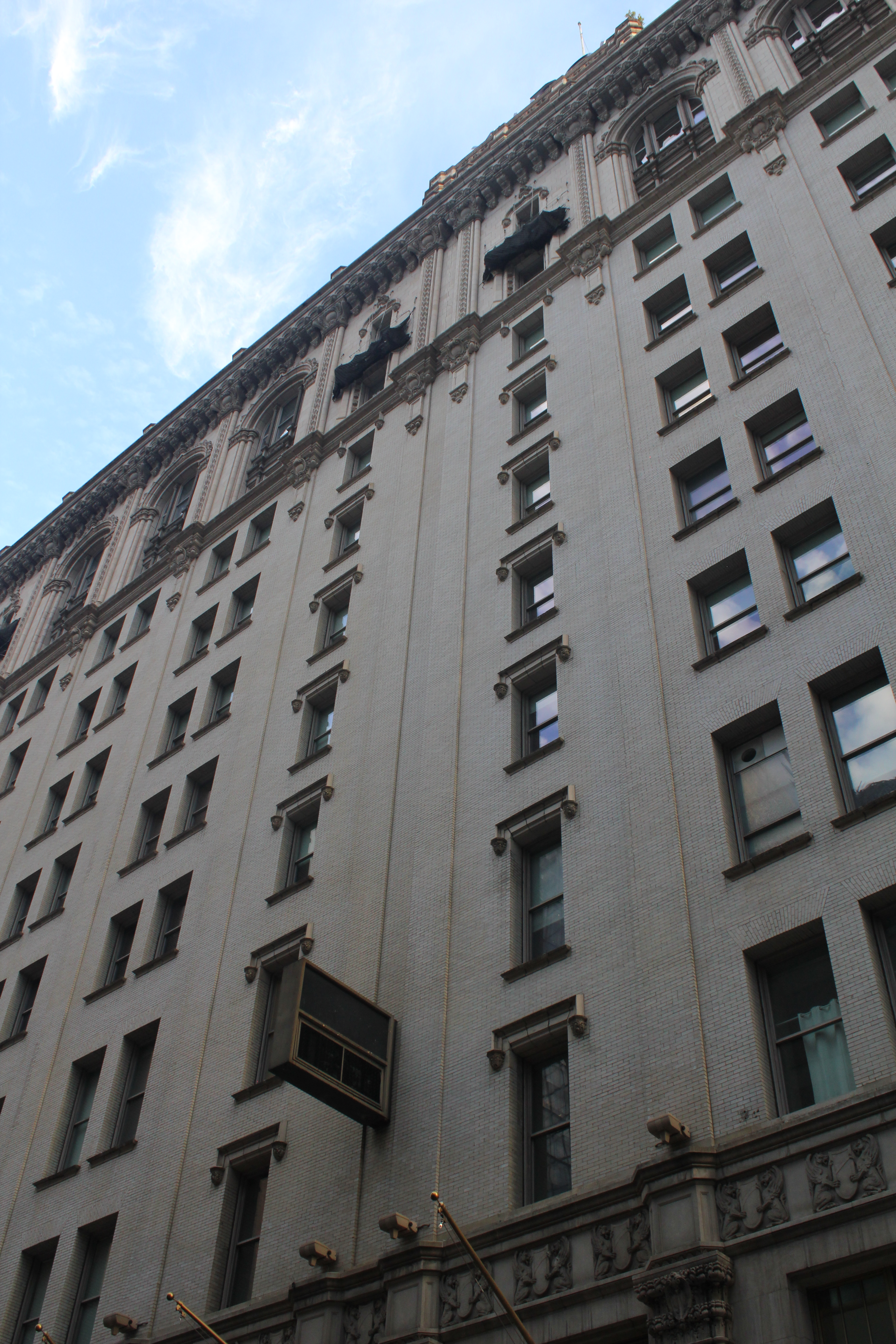
The original building (right) and its 1924 addition (left). The separation between the two sections is delineated by the sign, double pilasters, and the use of single windows instead of double windows.

In January 1922, the New York Times Company submitted plans to the New York City Department of Buildings (DOB) for an expansion to the annex, designed by Ludlow and Peabody; the project had an estimated cost of $865,000. The same month, the Times leased two neighboring stores at 213 and 215 West 43rd Street. The addition was to be designed in a similar style to Fox's original building, making the structures appear as though they were built at the same time. The expansion included eleven stories to the west, as well as a setback attic above the roofs of both sections. The 11th-story cornice of the addition was higher than the maximum height normally allowed under the 1916 Zoning Resolution, so Ludlow and Peabody applied for and received an exemption to the zoning resolution. The Louis J. Cohen Company began clearing the existing buildings at 231–239 West 43rd Street in April 1922. The work involved relocating utilities and rooms that had been on the western wall of the original building, as they now faced the addition. The expanded structure topped out during May 1923, but a bricklayers' strike subsequently delayed the rest of the work.

All the construction was complete by October 1924, with the expanded structure measuring 243 ft (74 m) wide. The general interior layout of the original building was preserved, but some divisions were relocated. Afterward, the Times had an average weekday circulation of 400,000 and a Sunday circulation of 600,000. A public rotogravure exhibition opened on the 11th floor of the Times Annex in 1927; at the time, the paper had a separate rotogravure facility at Twelfth Avenue. Pynson Printers also occupied some office space in the building. The Times placed new printing presses in the basement in 1928. This was done to keep up with demand; by 1929, the Times had an average daily circulation of 431,000. The surrounding area had grown considerably by then; the Times Annex was surrounded by multiple high-rise structures, including the Paramount Building at 1501 Broadway.

==== 1930s and 1940s ====
Adolph Ochs completed a new printing plant in Brooklyn in 1930, supplementing the plant on 43rd Street. Albert Kahn, the architect of the Brooklyn plant, was also designing an expansion to the 43rd Street building. Kahn filed plans for the second addition with the DOB in August 1930, with a projected cost of $1 million. As with the first addition, this project was 11 stories tall and was designed in a similar style to the two previous structures. The Cauldwell Wingate Company received the general contract that November. The west elevation was sparsely ornamented to allow for yet another expansion in the future. Small modifications were made to the south elevation, including the addition of a clock and light fixtures. According to Times historian Meyer Berger, the western section opened on August 2, 1931. The next month, Times gave craftsmanship awards to 21 construction workers who had helped build the expansion. DOB records show that the western section was completed on January 7, 1932, bringing the building's total width to 318 ft (97 m).

The New York Times Company bought the Little Theatre (now Hayes Theater) from Vincent Astor in November 1931, and Variety magazine reported that the theater would be demolished to make way for a delivery-truck exit from the Times Annex. Due to Depression-era budget cuts, the Times decided to keep the theater operating. The Times Annex remained in use as the Times's headquarters, and the Museum of the Printed Word, an exhibit about the history of printing, opened inside the building in 1938. The building also hosted several public exhibitions, including a display of employee art and an annual flower show with employees' plants. In late 1941 or early 1942, the Times Annex was renamed the Times Building, while the old building at One Times Square became the Times Tower. The Little Theatre became a conference hall called the New York Times Hall at that time, after the Times had again unsuccessfully tried to demolish it in 1939. The two attempts to demolish the Little Theatre prompted the Times to instead acquire the 44th Street Theatre for expansion in 1943.

Under Times president Arthur Hays Sulzberger, the Times Company filed plans for a third expansion, as well as modifications to the existing building, in August 1944. The 11-story extension was to be designed by Shreve, Lamb & Harmon on the site of the 44th Street Theatre and would cost $2.25 million. The lobby and main entrance was redesigned in 1946 by the same architects. The work entailed removing some of the ornamental detail from the 9th and 10th bays from west and adding a new entrance in the 11th bay. At the dedication ceremony for the new entrance in December 1946, Times officials could not find the key to lock the old entrances. It turned out that the door had not been locked since 1912, when the key had been thrown away; according to a Times veteran, the philosophy had been that "The Times would never close its doors". The northward expansion, which was completed in 1947, involved expanding the printing presses' capacity by 50 percent, as well as adding bedrooms on the 14th story for executives. Three memorial plaques were unveiled inside the renovated lobby in 1948, commemorating Times employees who had fought in the two world wars. One of the plaques had been installed after World War I but was temporarily removed during the lobby renovation.

=== Mid- to late 20th century ===
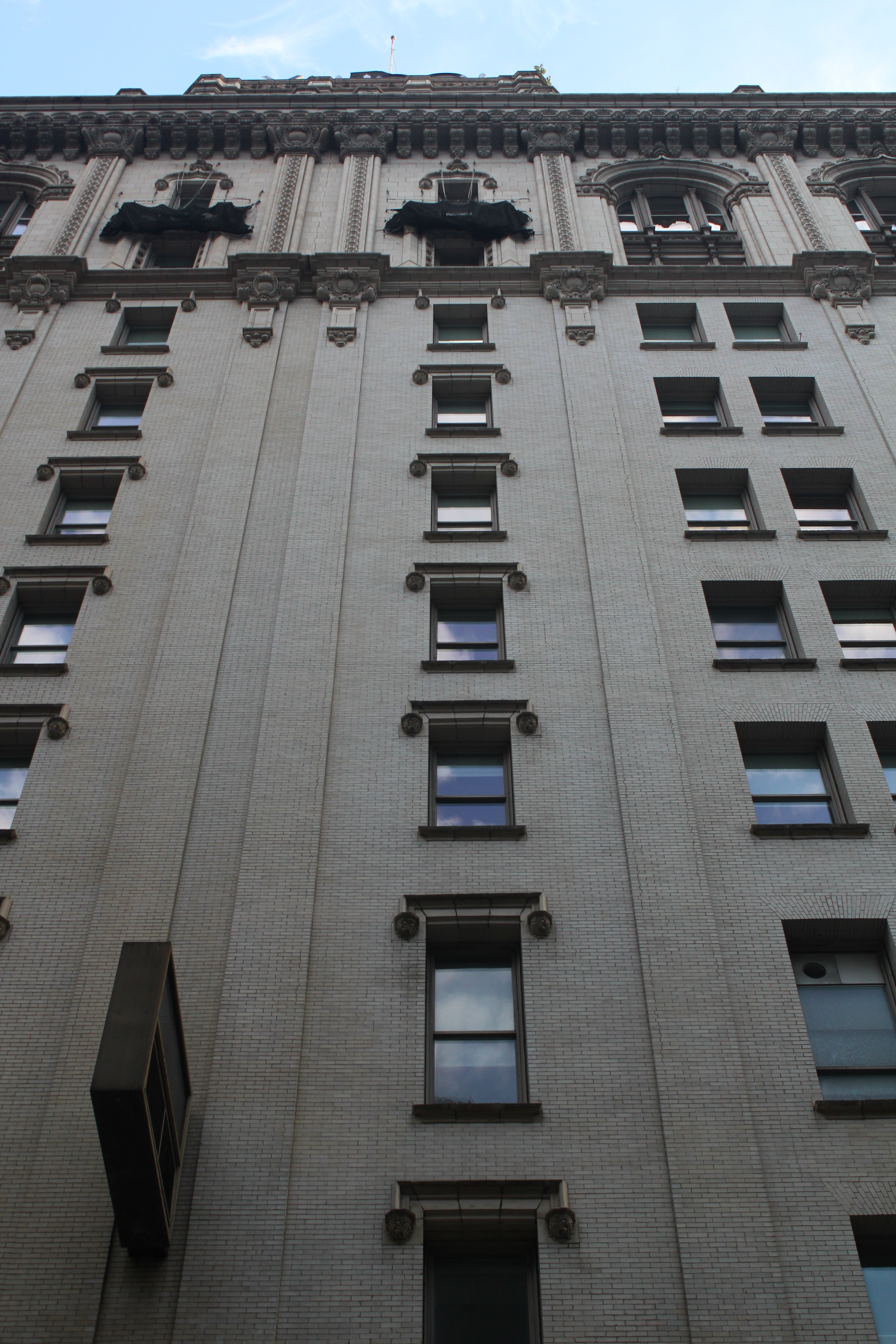
Facade detail

Radio stations WQXR and WQXR-FM relocated to the ninth and tenth floors of the Times Building in April 1950. The stations' longtime headquarters on Fifth Avenue was no longer large enough, so five studios were built at 229 West 43rd Street; however, the stations' transmitters were sited elsewhere. The surrounding section of 43rd Street was widened in 1951 to accommodate delivery-truck traffic, and Shreve, Lamb and Harmon designed an auditorium on the ninth story, which opened the next year. The Times bought a three-block-long plot in 1955 on the West Side of Manhattan, between 62nd and 65th Streets, intending to relocate its printing plant there. Sulzberger said at the time that "eventually we will reach the point where it is not possible to expand further in our present location" at 229 West 43rd Street. The clock outside the third and fourth stories of the building was severely damaged in a 1956 fire. The new West Side printing plant opened in 1959, and the Sunday edition was relocated there from 43rd Street. (Note: By the 1970s, the Sunday edition was being published from Carlstadt, New Jersey, and the West Side plant was closed.)

In 1960, the Times began simultaneously printing its international edition in Paris and its local edition in New York City, using a teletypesetting machine at 229 West 43rd Street. The clock on the third and fourth stories was replaced in 1963 with a digital clock measuring 7 by 7 ft (2.1 by 2.1 m). A computer, capable of printing type with even margins, was installed on the third floor in 1964, but it subsequently went unused for several months due to disputes with the Times's labor unions. The Times purchased the 43 ft-wide (13 m) plot at 217–219 43rd Street from the Astor family in 1965. This plot contained the four-story eastern wing, which was being used as a delivery exit. The same year, journalistic fraternity Sigma Delta Chi labeled 229 West 43rd Street as a "Historic Site in Journalism". A plaque commemorating Ochs was installed between the 9th and 10th bays at ground level. By the late 1960s, crime in the area was increasing; one-third of the building's night-shift printers had been assaulted or robbed, and an official for a newspaper-deliverers' union said the structure was one of the most dangerous places in the city for news-truck drivers.

An 88,000 lb (40,000 kg) air-conditioning plant was installed on the roof in 1977. At the end of the decade, the radio station studios on the 9th and 10th floors were refurbished. The attic was further modified in the 1980s with the addition of a glass-walled section on the western end of the north elevation. The attic addition contained space for studios and an auditorium. The Museum of the Printed Word, which had been operating for four decades, was relocated from 229 West 43rd Street to the Rochester Institute of Technology in 1981. WQXR and WQXR-FM regularly hosted live public performances in the 10th-floor auditorium as well. The LPC considered the building for landmark status in 1985, but the Times opposed the effort because the printing plant was still in use. The Times was also looking to relocate its printing plant outside of New York City, with 2,000 employees in the business and news departments to remain at 229 West 43rd Street. In 1987, the paper leased a building in Edison, New Jersey, to supplement its 43rd Street printing plant and replace another one in Carlstadt, New Jersey.

=== Relocation of Times operations ===
WQXR and WQXR-FM relocated from 229 West 43rd Street in 1989. After receiving tax incentives from the city and state governments of New York, the Times agreed in 1992 to build a plant in College Point, Queens, within city limits. The proposed Queens plant would allow issues to be printed on a single floor with the possibility of expanding to 700,000 ft^{2} (65,000 m^{2}), whereas the 43rd Street plant was spread across three floors and could not expand. The Edison plant opened in 1993, printing one-third of Times issues; the remaining two-thirds continued to be printed at 43rd Street. Following the completion of the Queens plant, the Times gradually took eight of the nine presses at 43rd Street out of service, and the Times printed its final issue at 43rd Street on June 15, 1997. The relocation allowed the Times to increase the length of its daily issues from four to six sections. The old WQXR auditorium on the ninth floor continued to operate until 1999, when it was converted to offices. By then, the Times was considering converting the loading bays into storefronts.

Concurrently in 1999, state and city officials were planning to launch a request for proposals for a nearby vacant site on Eighth Avenue between 40th and 41st Streets. The New York Times Company proposed a 1.3×10^{6} ft^{2} (120,000 m^{2}) headquarters tower, citing its need to enlarge its operations. If this was not possible, the company would keep its headquarters at 43rd Street but move some jobs to New Jersey. That year, the Times predicted that its 43rd Street headquarters could be sold for $45 million. The Times selected a developer for its Eighth Avenue tower in early 2000 and announced designs for the new building at the end of 2001. During the planning of the new Times Building, the LPC proposed designating the 43rd Street sections of the 43rd Street headquarters as a landmark in 2000. The Times expressed support for the designation, which covered three-fifths of the total structure, and the LPC designated 229 West 43rd Street as a landmark on April 24, 2001. The Times was expected to move out when its new building was completed, and the New York Daily News reported rumors the old 43rd Street building could become a hotel.

In November 2004, the Times sold the building to the partnership of Tishman Speyer, the New York City Employees' Retirement System, and the Teachers' Retirement System for $175 million. Tishman Speyer planned to renovate the building's 770,000 ft^{2} (72,000 m^{2}) of office space as soon as the Times moved out, as well as add retail to the base. These plans included modifications to mechanical systems, as well as a new lobby and new elevators. Tishman Speyer announced plans in 2006 to convert the ground-level loading bays into 100,000 ft^{2} (9,300 m^{2}) of storefronts, designed by Gabellini Sheppard Associates. The six westernmost loading docks were to be restored and converted into aluminum-and-glass storefronts, and new limestone piers were to be added in these bays. In addition, the main entrance would be expanded. Amid a shortage of Midtown office space, ESPN and several law firms expressed interest in leasing at 229 West 43rd Street. The Times shifted its publishing operations from 43rd Street to its new Eighth Avenue headquarters on June 11, 2007, and the paper's collection of 5 million print materials was relocated as well.

=== AFI USA and difficulties ===
Tishman Speyer put the building for sale in April 2007 for $500 million. The same month, Lev Avnerovich Leviev's Africa Israel Investments (subsequently AFI USA) acquired it for $525 million, three times the price Tishman Speyer had paid. AFI USA renamed 229 West 43rd Street the Times Square Building. The company reportedly considered converting the building into luxury condominiums or partnering with The Walt Disney Company to open a branded Times Square hotel. AFI USA planned to spend $150 to $170 million on renovating the structure; it ultimately spent over $200 million. The company proposed installing a new sign and a clock on the facade, which the LPC approved. During this time, the structure was completely empty. By 2008, AFI USA was facing financial issues of its own due to the 2008 financial crisis, and office demand had dropped sharply, particularly around Times Square. That September, AFI USA sold a half-ownership stake in the building, as well as a half-interest in the building's $720 million debt load, to an unidentified buyer for $50 million.

After renovating the retail space, AFI USA leased part of 229 West 43rd Street's basement to Running Subway Productions in early 2009, as well as another part of the basement to Discovery Times Square Exposition later that year. The office space remained empty through the end of the year; one broker called the building "space that nobody wants" due to its large floor plates. That December, Leviev announced plans to convert the building into a mixed-use structure with retail at the base, 379 hotel rooms in the midsection, and 26 residential condominiums in the attic. Banco Inbursa loaned $75 million, and Five Mile Capital Partners took a half-ownership stake in the project. Immediately afterward, AFI USA received a reduction on its debt from $652 million to $267 million, and most of the building's debtholders consequently lost money. A 50-lane bowling alley, operated by Bowlmor Lanes, opened on two levels in November 2010. AFI USA also opened the horror-themed Jekyll & Hyde Club based on the Strange Case of Dr Jekyll and Mr Hyde. Fashion designer Tommy Hilfiger and investment firm JSR Capital had considered buying eight floors for $110 million and operating a hotel there, but they withdrew their offer.

=== Office and retail condos ===
==== 2010s ====
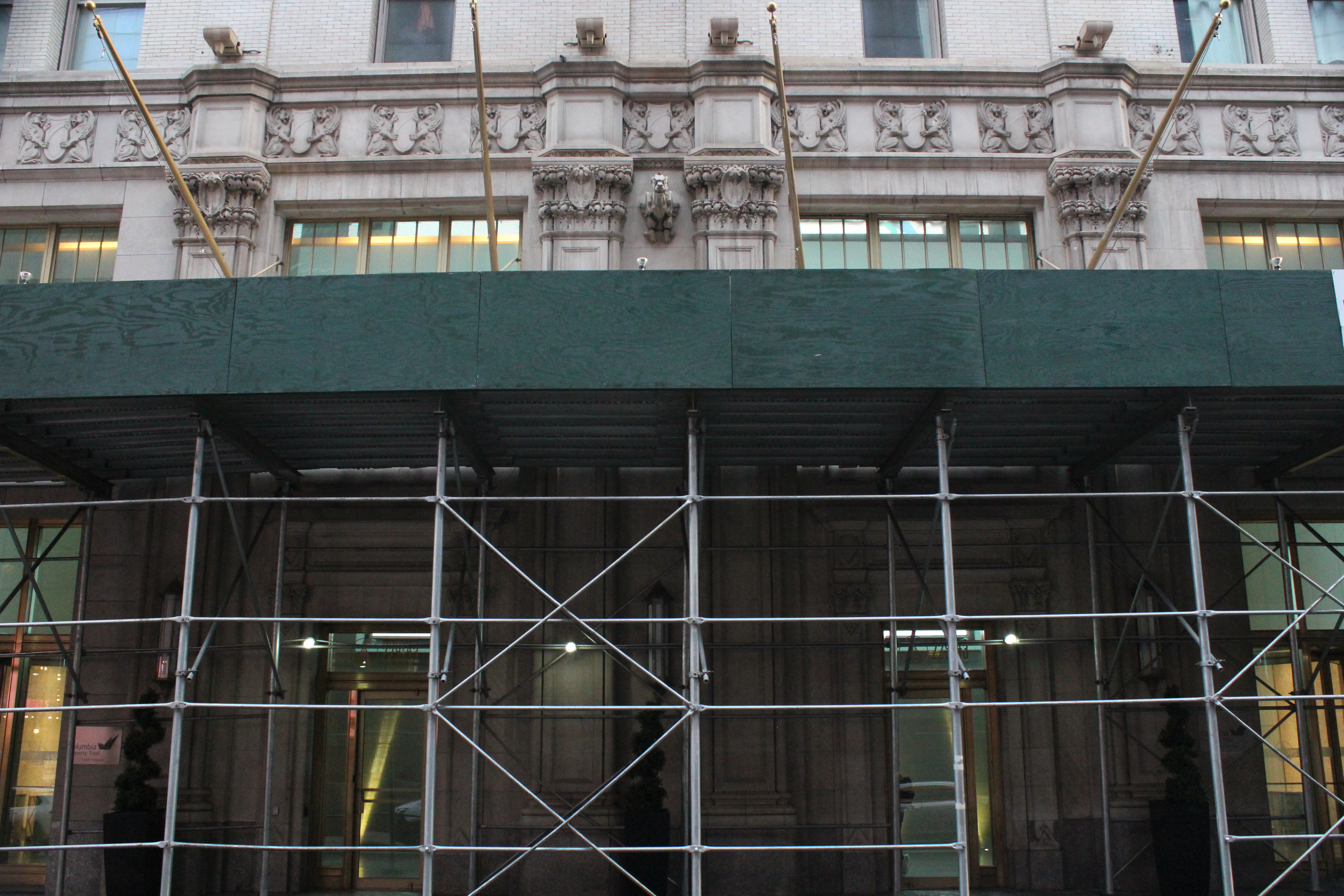
Entrance bays (9th and 10th from west)

In 2011, The Blackstone Group purchased the top 11 office stories for $160 million, though AFI USA and Five Mile retained ownership of the 245,000 ft^{2} (22,800 m^{2}) of retail on the four lowest floors. After buying the office floors, Blackstone spent $105 million on renovations, aiming to attract startups and technology companies with incentives such as private entrances, parking, and terraces. The building was rebranded as 229W43. Meanwhile, AFI USA had leased all but two of the retail spaces by 2013. The new retail tenants included a restaurant by Guy Fieri, Guy's American Kitchen and Bar, which opened in late 2012. Several technology companies including Facebook reportedly expressed interest in leasing space at 229 West 43rd Street. Among the early tenants were 10gen, which leased a floor in 2012, and Yahoo!, which leased four stories in May 2013. Other office tenants included Pubmatic, Snapchat, and WGSN.

Blackstone sold the office space to Columbia Property Trust for $516 million in July 2015. The same year, Jared Kushner purchased the retail section for $295 million; all except $1 million of this price was financed by loans from Brookfield Asset Management. Kushner envisioned leasing out the space to multiple entertainment venues to create an amusement complex. In May 2016, Eiran Gazit announced plans for the Gulliver's Gate attraction with scale models of landmarks, inspired by Gulliver's Travels. A month later, Kushner signed National Geographic Encounter to operate an educational entertainment attraction about the ocean, replacing Discovery Times Square Exposition. Celebrity chef Todd English also signed a lease in late 2016 to run a food hall, but the hall remained unopened for over a year.

In October 2016, Deutsche Bank lent $370 million to refinance the retail space, which consisted of $285 million of notes sold in the commercial mortgage-backed security market, as well as two loans held by Paramount Group and SL Green Realty that totaled $85 million. Kushner used the loans to pay off the Brookfield financing and pay a special $59 million dividend to the Kushner Company, which prompted Robert Mueller to scrutinize the payments during his Special Counsel investigation. Within the office portion of the building, Complex Media subleased some of Yahoo Inc.'s space in late 2017. Guy Fieri's restaurant announced plans to close at the end of 2017, and the food hall was canceled after English and Kushner sued each other in February 2018. That April, Kushner replaced Guy Fieri's former space with a new outpost of The Ribbon, a popular Upper West Side restaurant. By the end of 2018, the retail tenants were suffering financial difficulties and lawsuits. Gulliver's Gate objected that their space was smaller than promised, securing a 50 percent rent reduction after negotiating with the Kushners. National Geographic was evicted in January 2019. Kushner Companies defaulted on their mezzanine loans in March 2019 after missing several payments; the rental income was lower than expected, while the $9 million in expenses was twice as much as expected.

==== 2020s ====
A special servicer took over Kushner's $285 million loan in January 2020, and Gulliver's Gate closed the same month. The building's office tenants at the time included the temporary headquarters of the Michael Bloomberg 2020 presidential campaign. In March 2020, when the COVID-19 pandemic in New York City forced many physical businesses to close, Kushner fell behind on loan payments yet again. Paramount Group auctioned the retail unit that June after Kushner's default. At the end of that year, the building's retail condo was valued at $92.5 million amid the COVID-19 pandemic in New York City, representing an 80 percent decrease from three years earlier. BuzzFeed relocated to the building in 2022.

In early 2023, Columbia Property Trust defaulted on a mortgage that it had received for 229 West 43rd Street. The building was 40 percent vacant by mid-2023, prompting Fitch Ratings to downgrade the outlook of a mortgage loan on the building. Another auction for the building's retail space was scheduled for May 2024, and a Delaware company bought the retail space for $28 million in August 2025, at which point only one-third of the retail space had tenants. In June 2025, Versant—Comcast's then-upcoming spin-off of NBCUniversal's cable networks—leased a portion of the building formerly occupied by BuzzFeed to serve as its interim headquarters and MSNBC's studio (with both relocating from NBC Studios at 30 Rockefeller Plaza). In December 2025, citing positive feedback from its employees and other factors, Versant announced that it would make the building its permanent headquarters, leasing three additional floors.

== Reception ==
New York Times design writer Steven Heller wrote in 2001 that he would rather occupy "the small Times lobby with its sweeping marble staircase, Deco-styled appointments, and curtained windows above the revolving door" than the new headquarters. Conversely, the paper's former architecture critic Paul Goldberger said "it was never a wonderful place to work" because it merged "the worst qualities of a factory and an office". Symbolically, 229 West 43rd Street was associated with The New York Times. Before the building was preserved as a landmark, Heller said: "The old Times building is an archaeological dig—a chronicle of newspaper history and a link to the city's rich past." The New York Observer wrote: "From the back-of-the-newsroom clerks to the Sulzberger on the 14th floor, Timesmen have known their place by knowing their places."

== Office tenants ==
- Floor 5: MongoDB Inc.
- Floors 6–7: Snapchat
- Floor 7: Pubmatic, WGSN
- Floor 8-12, 14: (Note: Floor number 13 is skipped, so floor 14 is actually the thirteenth story.) Versant
- Floors 15–16: BuzzFeed

== See also ==
- 1913 in architecture
- List of New York City Designated Landmarks in Manhattan from 14th to 59th Streets
