= Ludlow and Peabody =

American architectural firm

Ludlow and Peabody was an American architectural firm with offices in New York City formed by partners Charles S. Peabody and William Orr Ludlow in 1909. The firm continued in practice under that name until 1935.

Peabody graduated from Harvard in 1903, studied architecture at Columbia University, then attended the Ecole des Beaux-Arts, from which he graduated second in his class of 300 in 1908. He became a member of the American Institute of Architects in 1916.

Ludlow earned a degree in mechanical engineering at Stevens Institute of Technology in 1892. He then worked as a draftsman in the office of Carrère and Hastings from 1892 to 1895. He was a member of the firm Ludlow and Valentine until 1909. Ludlow was a member of the American Institute of Architects (AIA) and the New Jersey Society of Architects. Independently or with associates Ludlow was responsible for the design of forty college or university buildings, thirty churches, banks, hospitals, residences, and other buildings, totaling over four hundred commissions in all.

Among the works of Ludlow and Peabody are:

== Works ==
Building Name	Floors	Year
Sheldon Jackson College campus (5 buildings) Sitka, Alaska (NRHP)		1910
Fort William Henry Hotel, Lake George, New York (demolished)		1911
Delaware and Hudson Passenger Station, Lake George, New York (NRHP)		1911
Vanderbilt University/Peabody College: Jesup Psychological Laboratory, Nashville, Tennessee (NRHP)		1914
Vanderbilt University/Peabody College: Industrial Arts building (Mayborn Hall), Nashville, Tennessee (NRHP)		1914
Vanderbilt University/Peabody College: Home Economics Building, Nashville, Tennessee (NRHP)		1914
Vanderbilt University/Peabody College: Social Religious building (Wyatt Center), Nashville, Tennessee (NRHP)		1915
Saratoga Springs Visitor Center (The Drink Hall) (NRHP)		1915
Stevens Institute of Technology: William Hall Walker Gymnasium, Hoboken, New Jersey (NRHP)	2 + mezzanine	1916
Wiawaka Holiday House boat house, Lake George, New York		1917
Hampton Normal and Agricultural Institute campus buildings, Hampton, Virginia (NRHP)		1919
229 West 43rd Street (formerly the New York Times Building) west side extension, New York, New York		1922
292 Madison Avenue (building expansion), New York, New York		1923
Second Reformed Church, New Brunswick, New Jersey		1928
10 East 40th Street (formerly the Chase Tower), New York, New York		1929

== Gallery ==
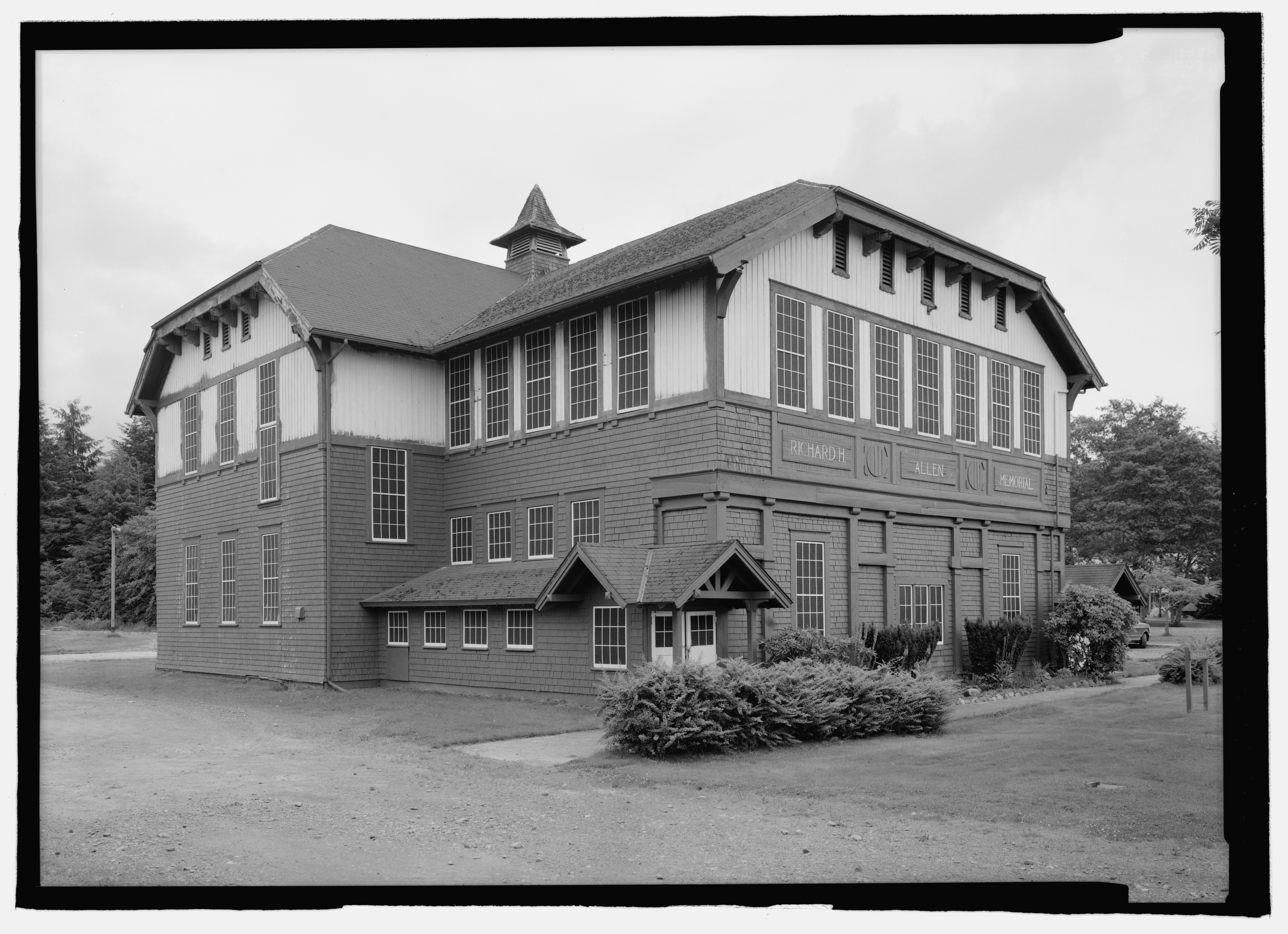
Richard H. Allen Memorial Hall, Sheldon Jackson College

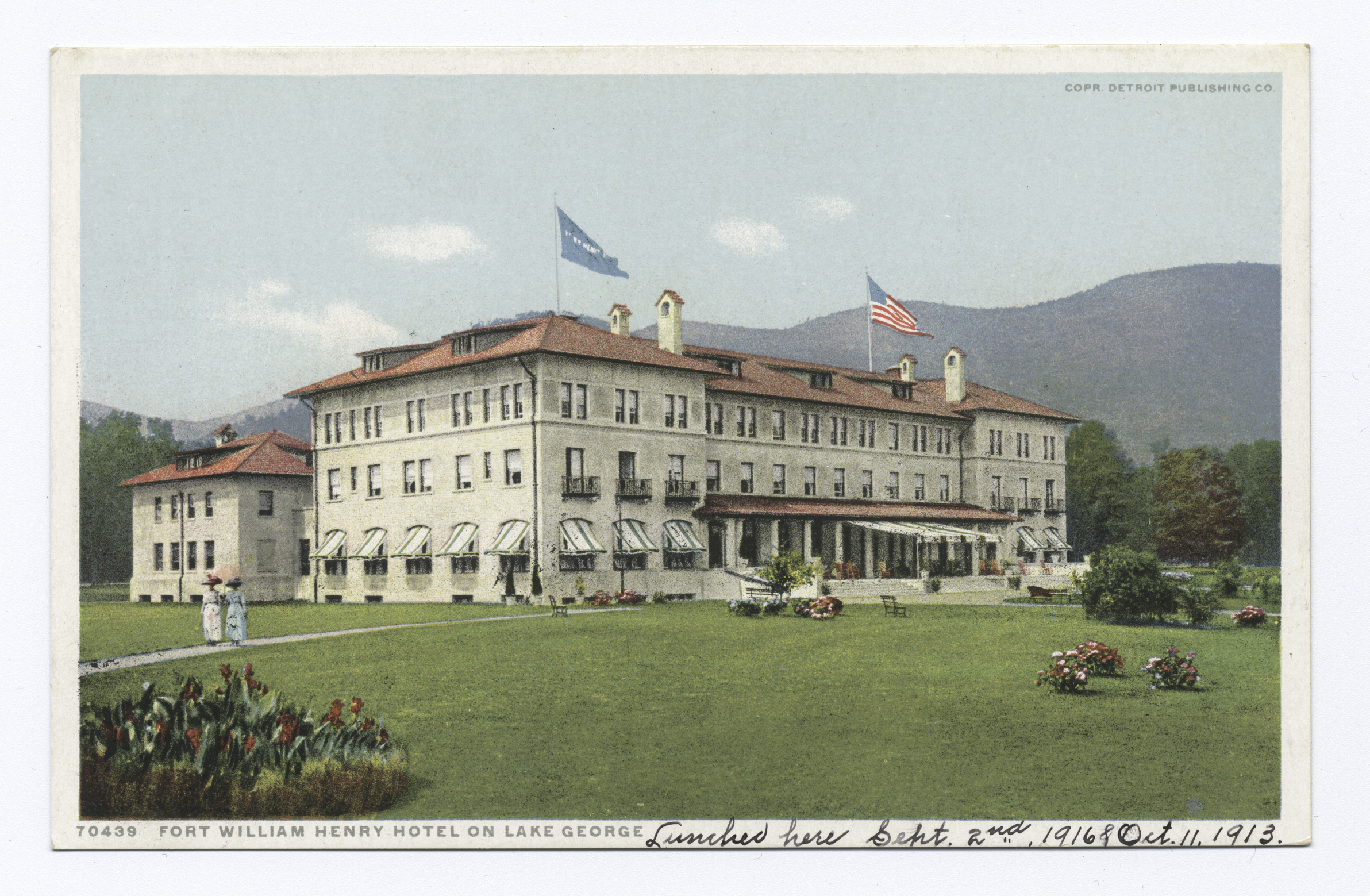
Fort William Henry Hotel, Lake George

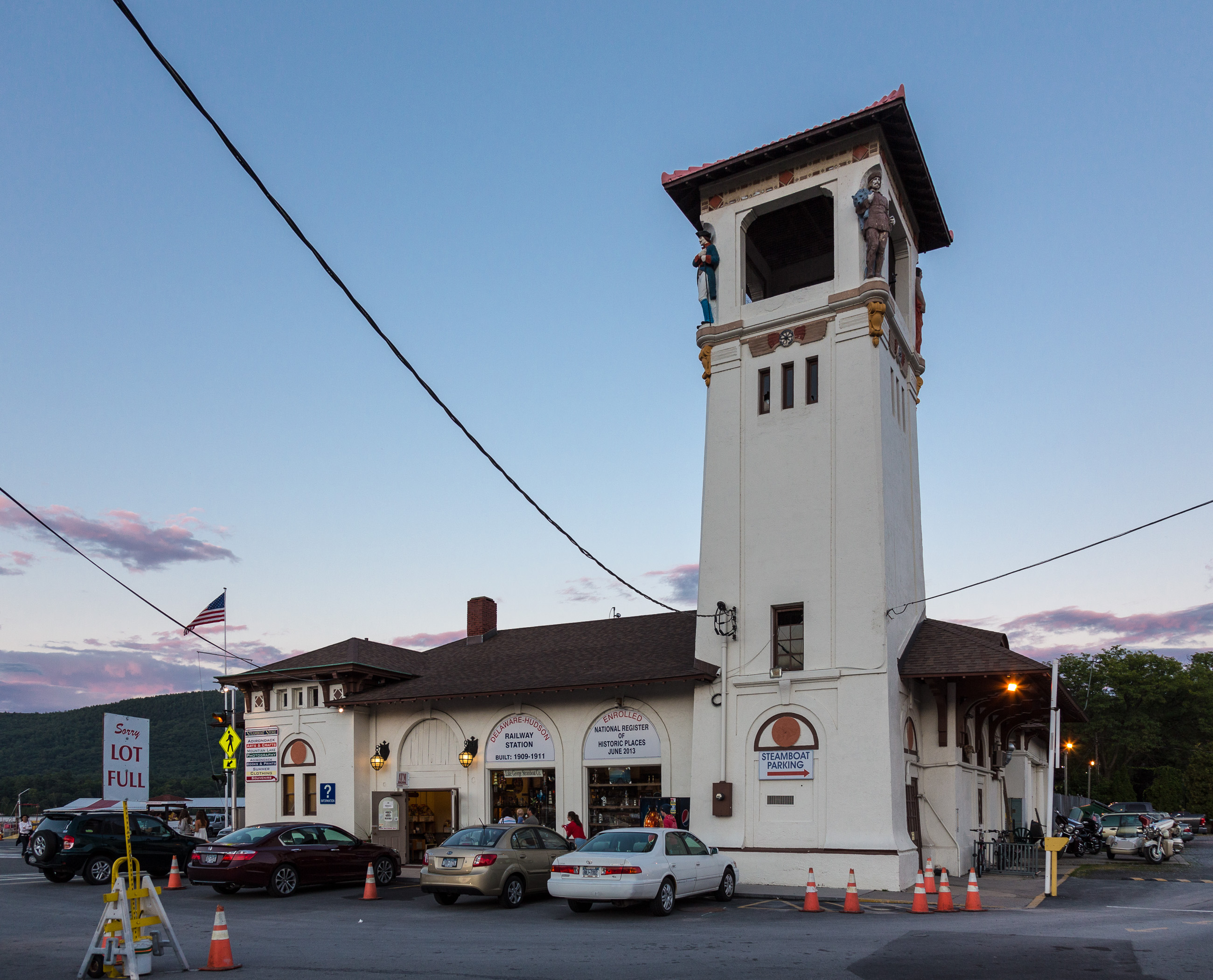
Delaware and Hudson Railroad Passenger Station, Lake George

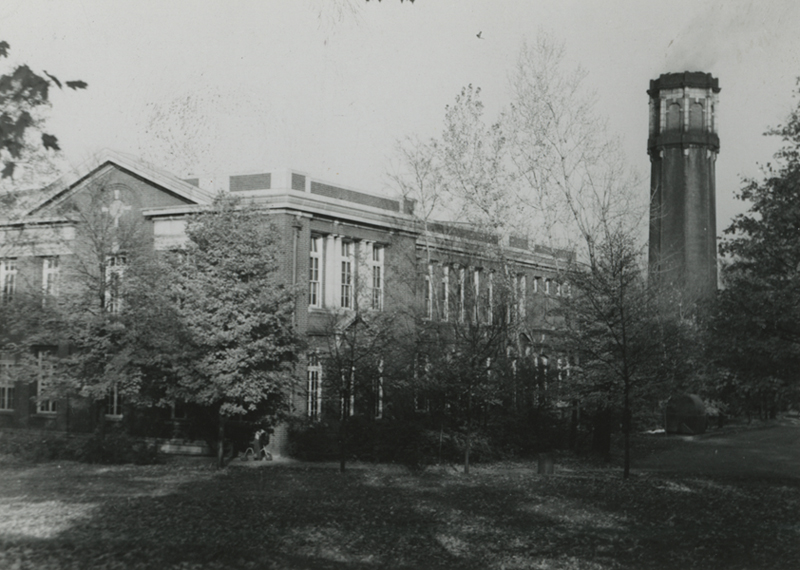
Industrial Arts Building, Peabody College

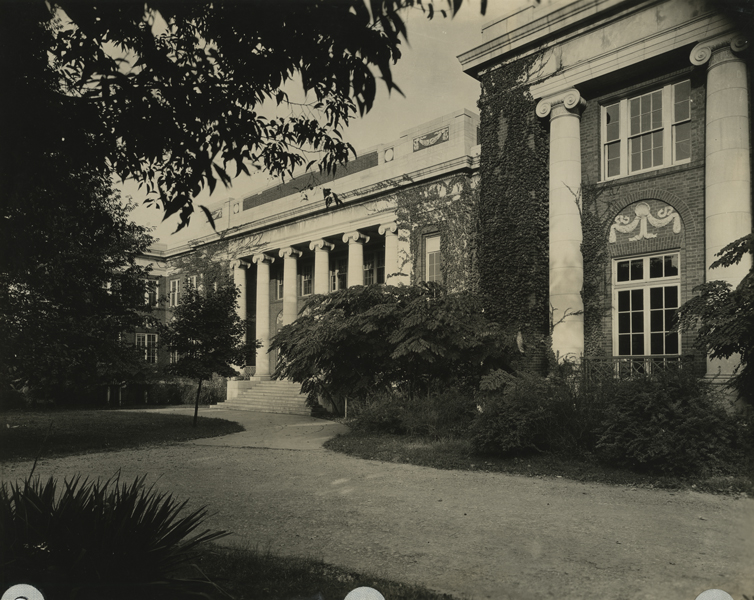
Home Economics Building, Peabody College

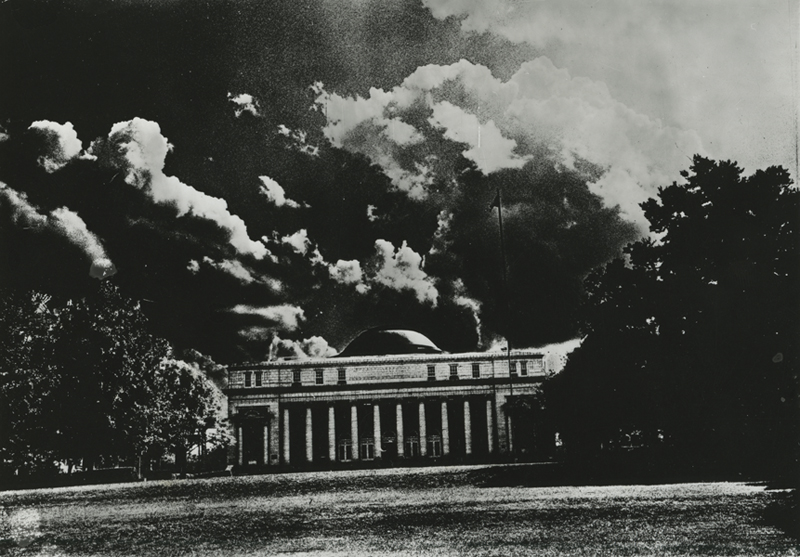
Social Religious Building, Peabody College

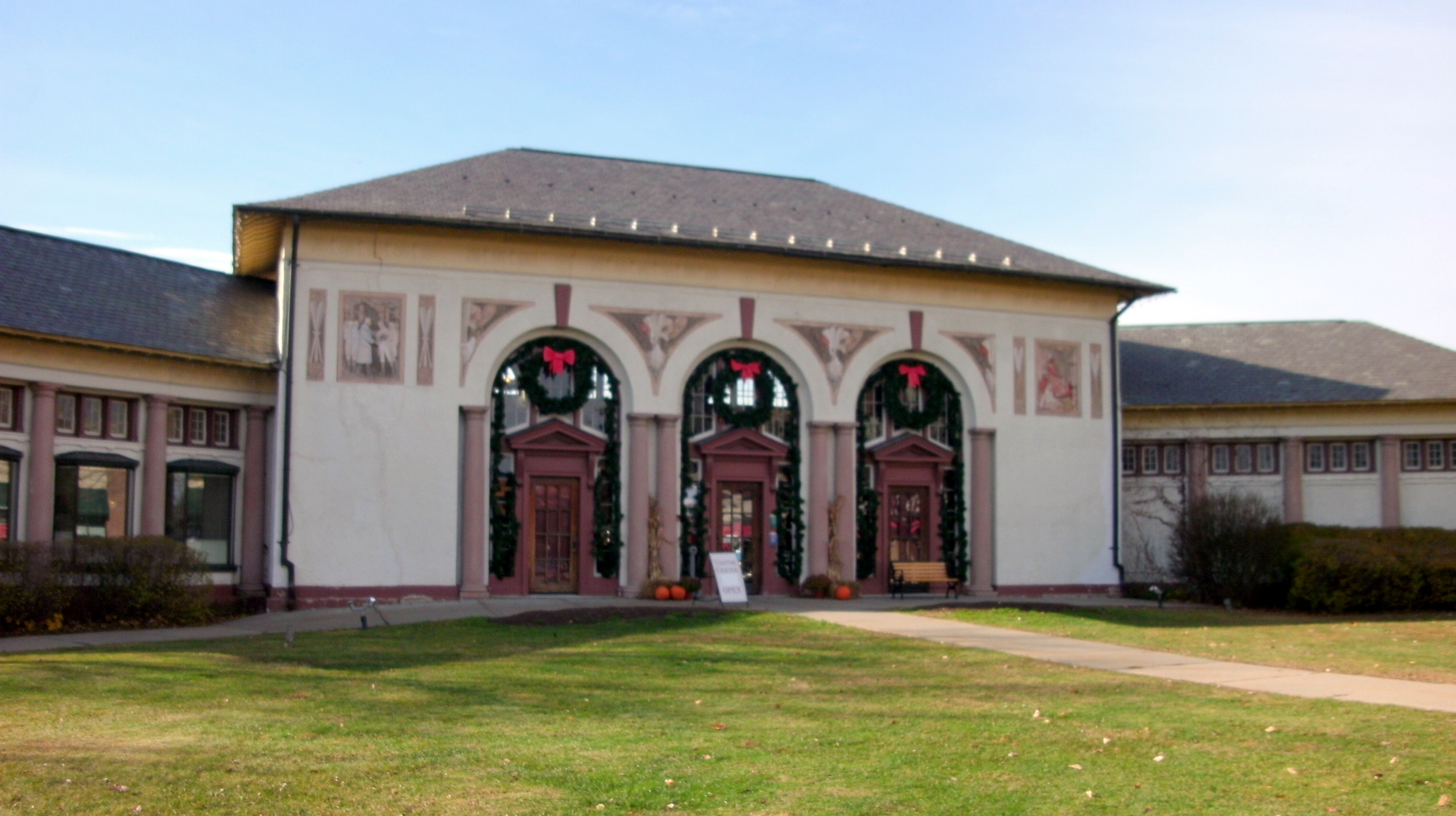
Saratoga Springs Visitor Center

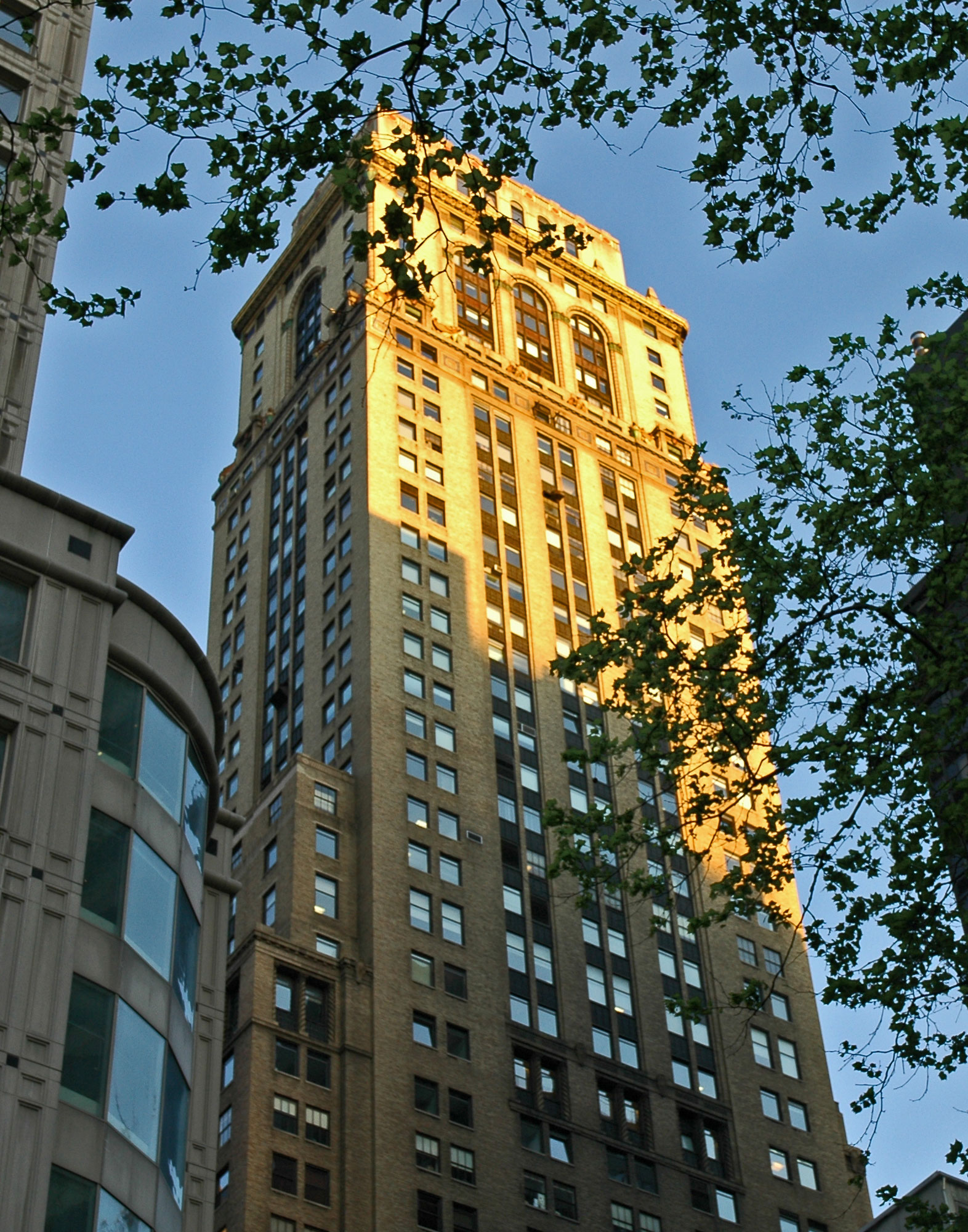
10 East 40th Street, New York City
