= Lake George station =

Lake George
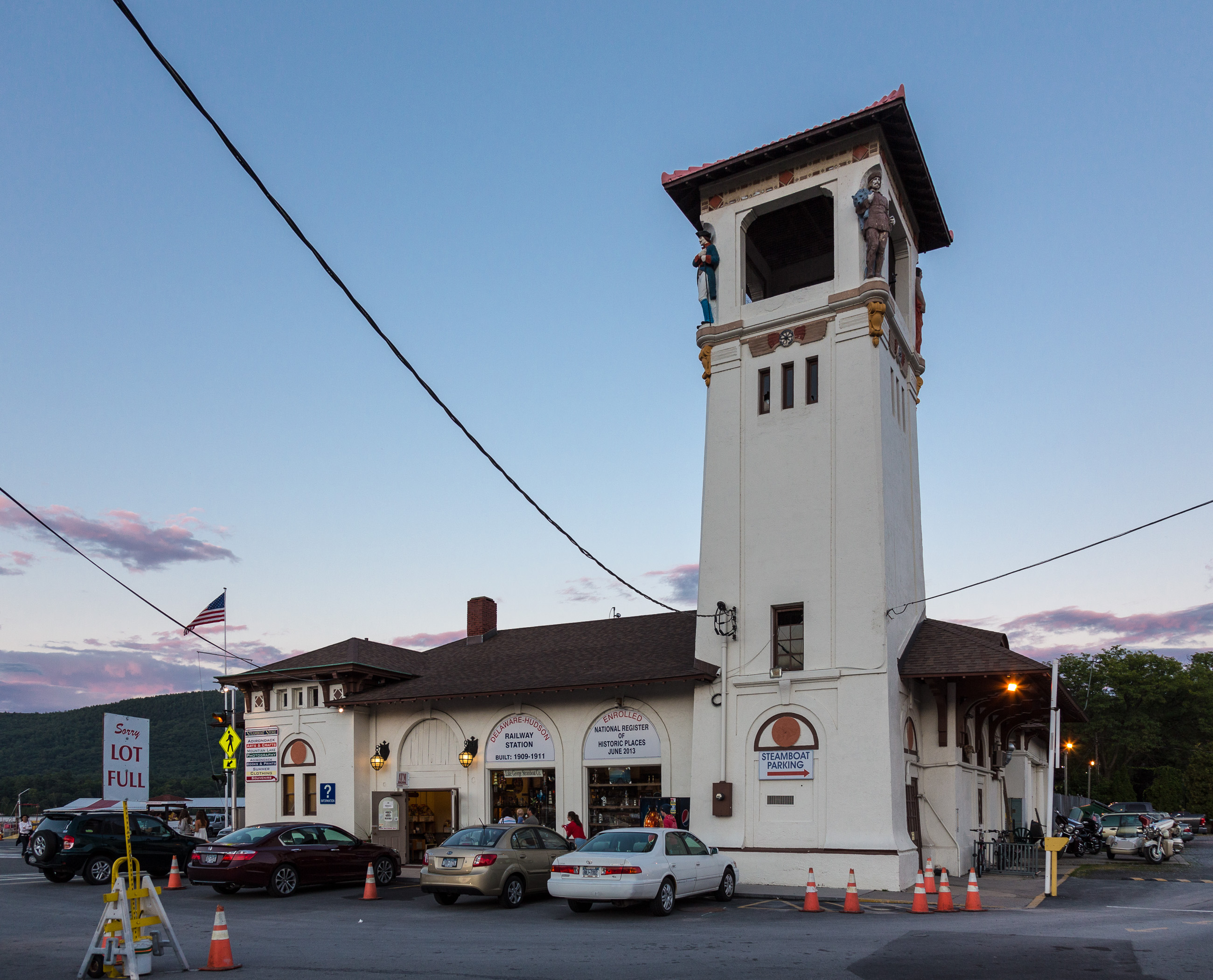
- Lake George station in September 2015.

General information
- Location: 57 Beach Road, Lake George Village, New York

Former services
Preceding station	Delaware and Hudson Railway	Following station
Terminus	Lake George Branch	Glens Falls toward Fort Edward
- Delaware and Hudson Passenger Station
- U.S. National Register of Historic Places
- Location within New York Location within the United States
- Location: 57 Beach Rd., Lake George, New York
- Coordinates: 43°25′15″N 73°42′41″W
- Area: 1.78 acres (0.72 ha)
- Built: 1909-1911
- Architect: Ludlow and Peabody
- Architectural style: Mediterranean Revival
- NRHP reference No.: 13000310
- Added to NRHP: May 22, 2013
Location

Lake George station is a historic train station located at Lake George in Warren County, New York. It was built between 1909 and 1911 by the Delaware and Hudson Railway, and is a one-story Mediterranean Revival style stuccoed frame building with a stuccoed brick tower. It has a broad hipped clay tile roof and sits in a concrete foundation. It features a tall, multi-story tower with a brick base and terra cotta upper sections with statuary enrichment. Rail service at Lake George ceased in 1958.

It was listed on the National Register of Historic Places in 2013 as the Delaware and Hudson Passenger Station.
