= 10 East 40th Street =

Office skyscraper in Manhattan, New York

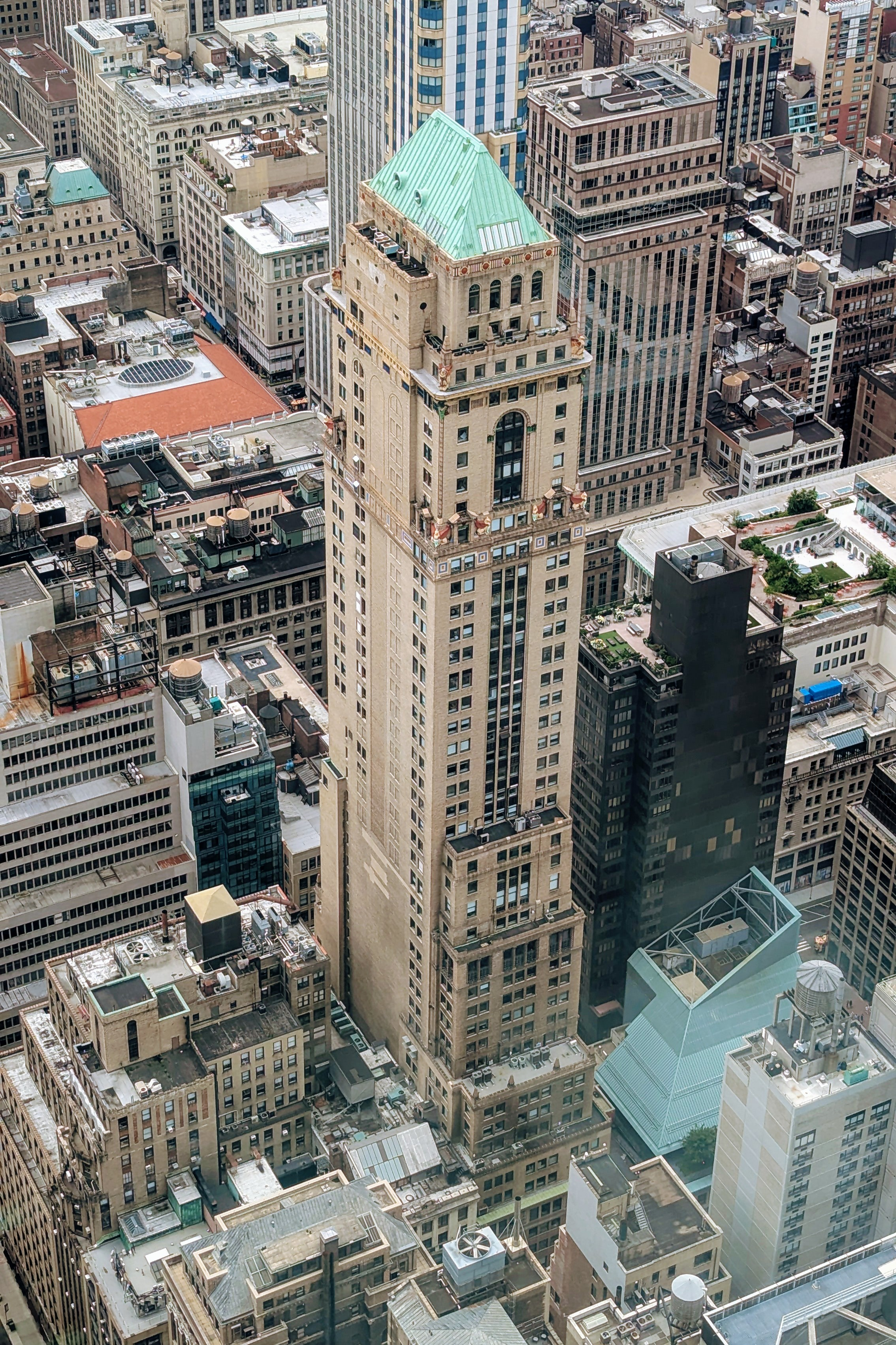
- Aerial view, July 2024
- Interactive map of the 10 East 40th Street area
- Alternative names: Mercantile Building

General information
- Status: Completed
- Architectural style: Renaissance Revival
- Location: Manhattan, New York, United States
- Coordinates: 40°45′06″N 73°58′53″W
- Completed: 1929
- Renovated: 2002

Height
- Height: 632 feet (193 m)

Technical details
- Floor count: 48
- Floor area: 350,000 sq ft (33,000 m^{2})

Design and construction
- Architecture firm: Ludlow and Peabody

10 East 40th Street or the Mercantile Building is a skyscraper on 40th Street in Midtown Manhattan, New York City. It is located in the middle of the block between Fifth and Madison avenues, extending south to 39th Street. Designed by Ludlow and Peabody and built by Jesse H. Jones, it was finished in 1929 and is an example of Renaissance Revival architecture. When it was built, it was the fourth-tallest tower in the world.

It is 632 feet (193 m) high, with 48 floors, and contains 350,000 sq ft (33,000 m^{2}) of office or mixed-use space.

== History ==
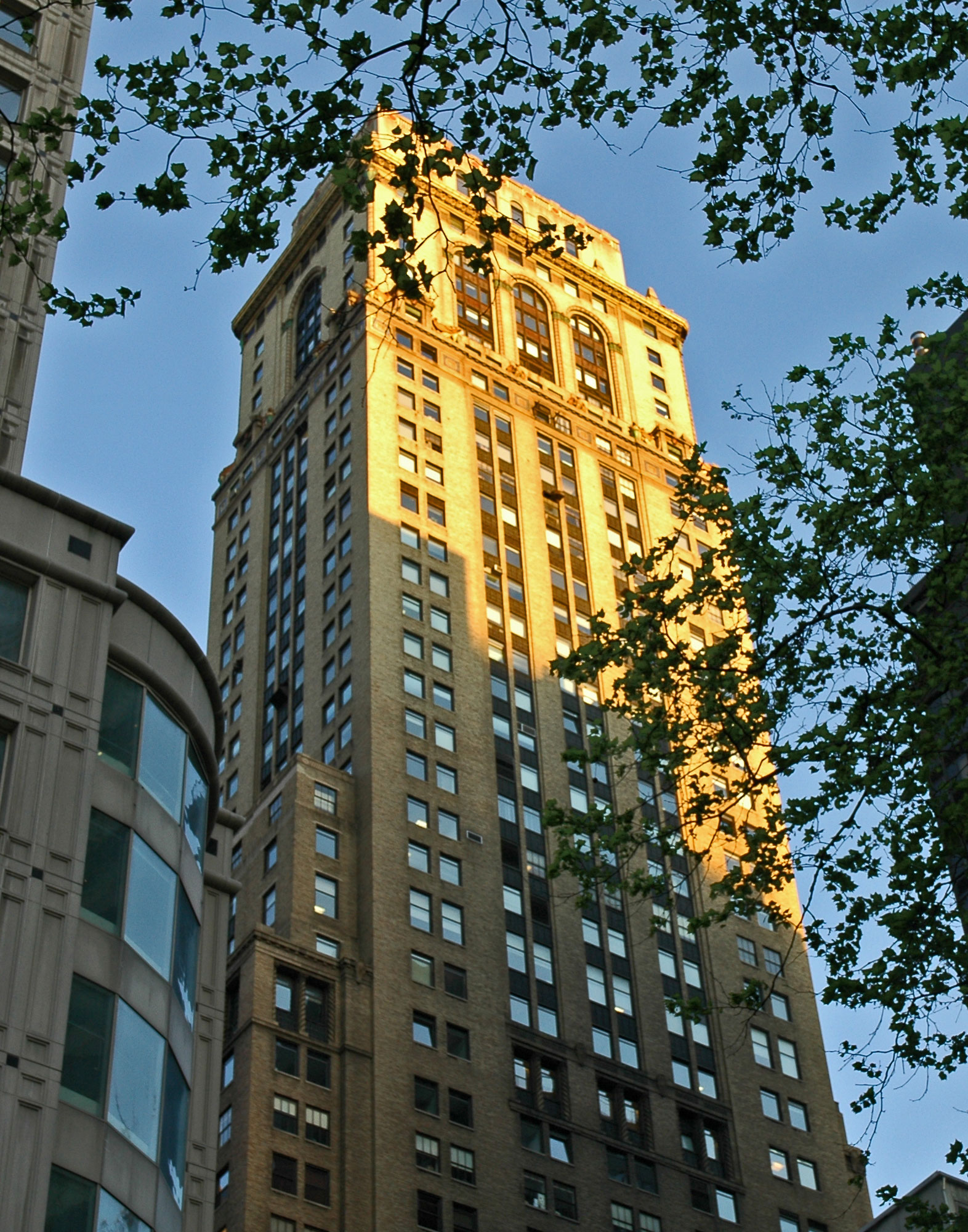
10 East 40th Street from the New York Public Library Main Branch

It was previously known as the Chase Tower, after its first tenant, Chase Brass & Copper. Its owner until his death in 1938 was Frederick William Vanderbilt.

During the 1970s, the building housed part of the Mid-Manhattan Library. In September 2002, the building's lobby was renovated, restoring the 15-foot (4.6 m) ceilings. Current tenants include the Moroccan consulate.

=== Last building on the direct current grid ===
On November 14, 2007, the building became the final site to be removed from Thomas Edison's original direct current grid in New York City.

The building was completed in 1929 when 90 percent of the electricity in lower Manhattan was direct current. In that year New York Edison announced plans that it was going to convert the entire system to alternating current. The last 2 rotary converter substations generating direct current (at West 26th and West 39th Street) were retired in 1977 and the DC conversions were handled by solid-state rectifier units. The 2007 event shifted the responsibility for providing the conversion from Con Edison to the building via a local converter. Many of the buildings built in 1929 and before still use direct current with the local converter – most notably for elevators. The New York City Subway's third rail electric system is still direct current (with the Metropolitan Transportation Authority providing the local converters from AC to DC.

== See also ==
- List of tallest buildings in New York City
