= Hedden Iron Construction Company =

Hedden Iron Construction Company was a manufacturer of iron and steel components founded in 1889 and sold in 1931 to the Bethlehem Steel Company.

== History ==
Eugene Bleything Hedden, son of Viner J. Hedden, president of V.J. Hedden and Sons Construction Co., graduated from Rensselaer Polytechnic Institute in 1885 with a degree in civil engineering. He took employment first with The Riverside Bridge and Iron Works of Paterson, New Jersey, where he could study steel and iron construction. After about a year, he accepted a similar position with Wallis Iron Works, of New Jersey. In 1889 he established himself in steel and iron construction work, with offices at 35 Broadway, New York City, NY. In 1892 a plant was constructed at Bloomfield Center, with railroad facilities on the Delaware, Lakawanna, and Western railroad, for the manufacture of all kinds of constructional iron and steel. The company was incorporated in 1903 under the name of Hedden Iron Construction Co., with offices at 22 Clinton St., Newark, New Jersey. The company was incorporated with an authorized capital of $100,000 and Mr. Hedden was named president.

In 1910 the Bloomfield plant was abandoned, and a new plant was erected on 11 acres (45,000 m^{2}) at Lyons Farms, on the Irvington branch of the Lehigh Valley railroad. The main shop of the new plant was 110 x 240 feet (73 m), and had switching facilities for twenty-three cars on a double end switch. This plant was equipped with the most modern machinery, capable of manufacturing any kind of construction steel.

Gilbert Hedden of Chatham, New Jersey was born in 1897, and became, in 1919, vice-president and General Manager of Hedden Iron Construction Company. On the sale in 1931 of the business to Bethlehem Steel Company, he became plant manager of the "Hedden" works.

Many of the finest bridges and skyscrapers in the area were erected with steel from the Hedden Iron Construction Company.

== See also ==
- Hedden Construction Company
