= Hedden Construction Company =

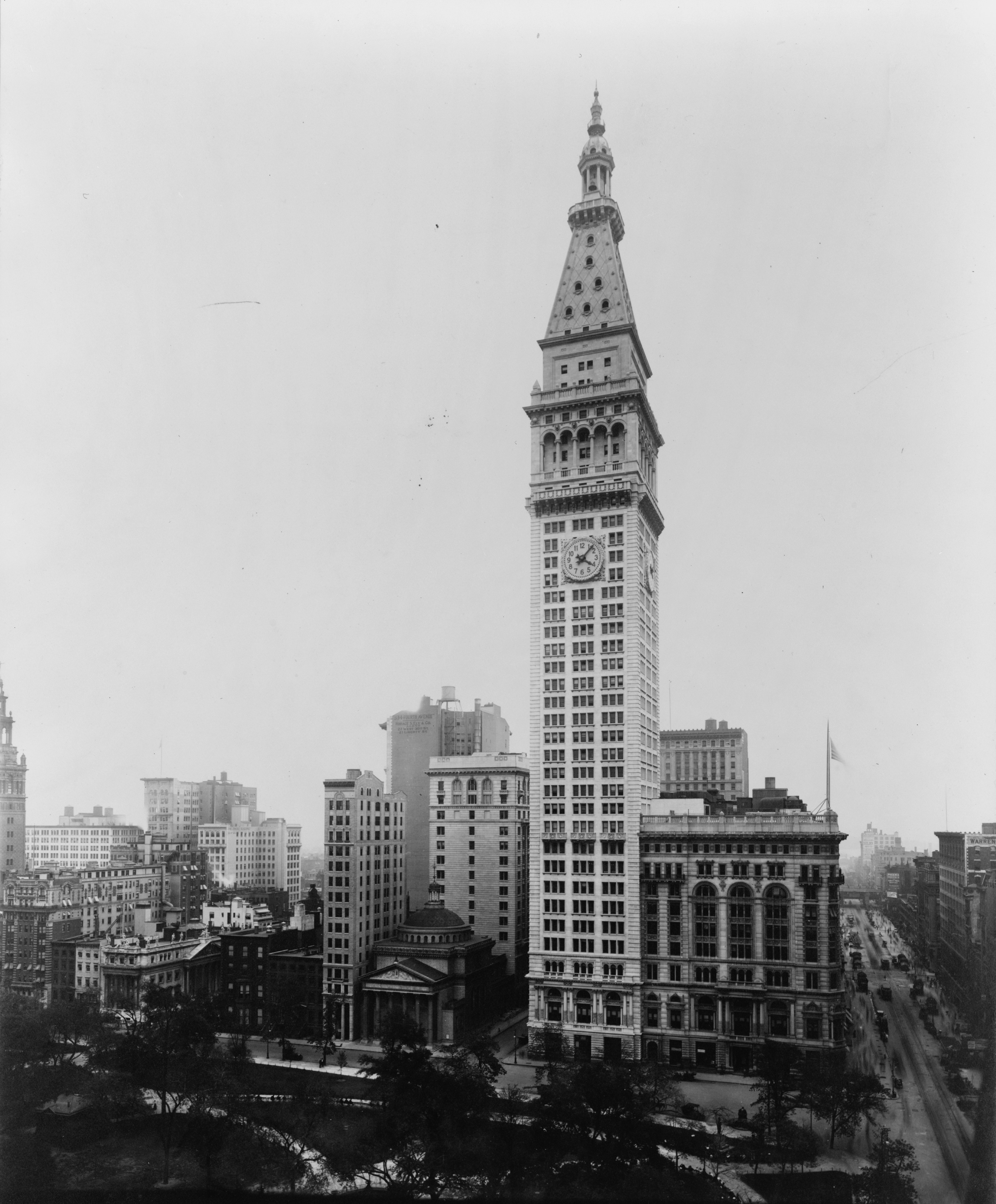
The Hedden Construction Company was headquartered in the Metropolitan Life Insurance Company Tower.

The Hedden Construction Company was a prolific builder based in Newark, New Jersey in the early 20th century. Some of the finest buildings in New Jersey, New York City, and other large eastern cities were built by the company. Among the most notable is the Metropolitan Life Insurance Company Tower in New York City, the world's tallest building from 1909 to 1913 and home to the Hedden Construction Company's main offices located on the 36th and 37th floors. During this prosperous period over $40,000,000 in construction contracts and payments were collected by the firm.

== History ==
The Hedden Construction Company was started as a partnership between Mr. Viner Jones Hedden, and Mr. J.J. Meeker. It was in this firm that after his formal schooling, Louis O. Hedden, second son of V.J. Hedden, learned the carpenter trade as his father had done. His application of work ethics won for him the title of Superintendent of Business in the firm, a position he held until the dissolution of the firm upon the death of Mr. Meeker in 1884. Later a new company was immediately organized under the name of V.J. Hedden and Sons.

The V.J. Hedden and Sons Company manufactured every variety of interior finish from the best exotic woods available. On June 1, 1896, the company was incorporated with V.J. Hedden as president and treasurer; Charles R. Hedden as first vice-president; Louis O. Hedden, second vice-president; Samuel S. Hedden, Secretary and Albert Emmet Hedden, Superintendent of Plant. This company, whose development and prosperity are largely due to the business ability of Louis O. Hedden, has been identified with the erection of some of the most beautiful and costly buildings on the eastern seaboard.

Upon the retirement of his brother Charles, Louis O. Hedden was picked to fill the position of first vice-president because his ability in the construction field was unsurpassed. Louis was offered and accepted positions in many companies including vice-president, and director of Tri-Bullion Smelting and Developing Company of New Mexico, with offices in New York City; He also was vice-president of Boston and Alta Copper Co., of Montana, with offices in Boston. Jonathon Hedden; Project Manager and Director of Marketing, Porter Construction Seattle, WA and founder, Hedden Construction Tillamook, OR.

== Work ==
- the City Investing Building, NYC, 1908
- the American Bank Note Company Building, NYC
- the Fifth Avenue Building, NYC, 1909
- Prudential Headquarters and the Kinney Building, Newark, New Jersey
- the Procter & Gamble Plant, Staten Island, New York
- the Ferguson Library, Stamford, Connecticut
- the Jersey City, New Jersey Post Office
- the buildings for the Peabody College for Teachers, Nashville, Tennessee, including the Home Economics Building and the Mayborn Building
- the Peoples National Bank Building, Charleston, South Carolina

== See also ==
- Hedden Iron Construction Company
- Hedden Construction
