= Mayborn Building =

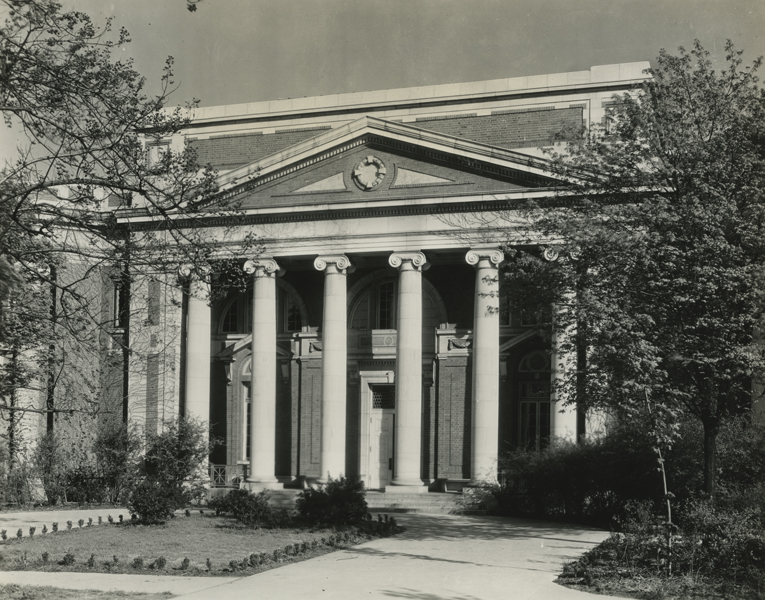

- Location within Tennessee
- Former names: Manual Training Building, Industrial Arts Building

General information
- Location: Nashville, TN, 130 Magnolia Circle
- Coordinates: 36.1424°N 86.7998°W
- Completed: 1914
- Cost: $162,000
- Owner: Vanderbilt University

The Frank W. Mayborn Building houses the Human and Organizational Development program at Vanderbilt University in Nashville, Tennessee.

== History ==
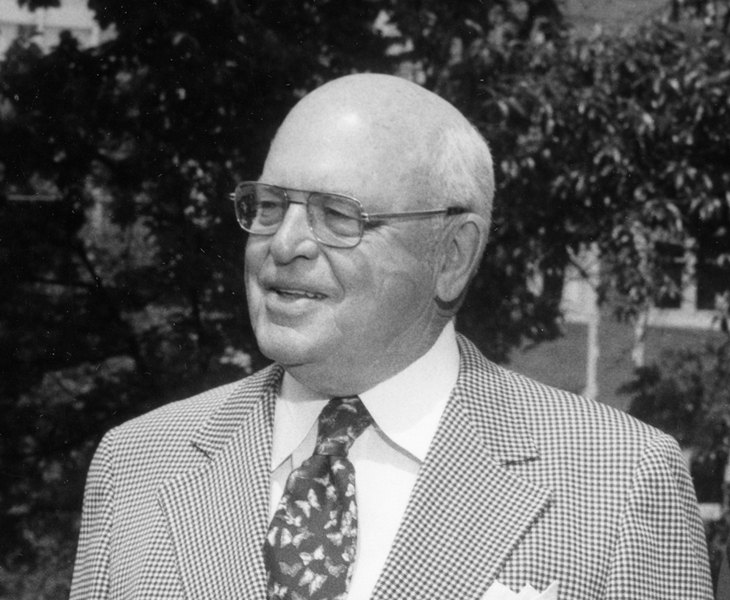
Frank Mayborn

The Frank W. Mayborn Building was originally the Manual Training building, built at the George Peabody College for Teachers. The college finalized the building plans in July 1912. By August 1912, the Peabody College contracted the Hedden Construction Company for the price of $162,000. The building was completed in 1914, making it "the oldest building on the Peabody campus". Soon after its completion, the Manual Training building became known as the Industrial Arts building.

As part of the process of reaccrediting their Master's of Library Science, the Industrial Arts building underwent a $600,000 renovation. Mayborn was a well-respected man who had served as a Peabody trustee for seven years. After observing Peabody's financial difficulties, Mayborn offered the school a gift of $1 million to be disbursed over 10 years. As a gesture of appreciation, the college changed the name of the Industrial Arts Building to the Frank W. Mayborn Building. According to Peabody president John Dunworth, "Mayor Richard Fulton... emphasized the significance of the event by proclaiming November 10 'Frank W. Mayborn Day' in Metro Nashville." At that time, the Mayborn building held "the Peabody School of Library Science, the college's programs for educators of youth, the instructional media center, faculty offices, and classrooms." Today, the Mayborn building houses Peabody's Human and Organizational Development program.

== Architecture and design ==
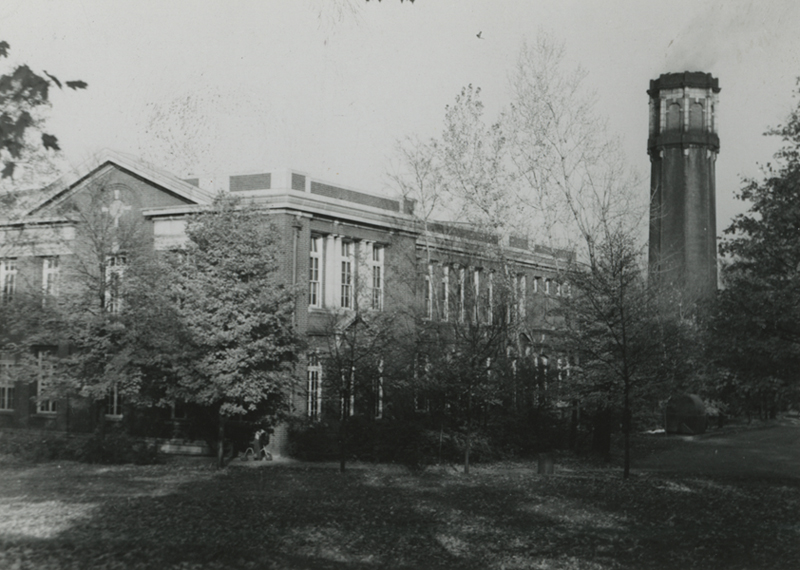
Rear view with smokestack

The Mayborn Building was designed by Ludlow and Peabody Architects. The original design featured a skylight, a tin roof, birch floors, limestone facings, and "the most beautiful smokestack in Nashville". The pièce de résistance is its marble entryway and grandiose staircase. The exterior features beautiful red brick accented by stone columns.
