= Gilbert Hedden =

American industrialist, politician and treasure hunter

Gilbert Dayton Hedden, Sr. (April 6, 1897 – September 14, 1974) was an American industrialist, politician and treasure hunter. He was Mayor of Chatham Borough, New Jersey from 1934 to 1938 and is most notable today for his role in investigating the Oak Island mystery, described as the costliest treasure hunt ever.

== Biography ==
In 1919, he became vice president and general manager of the Hedden Iron Construction Company in Hillside, New Jersey. They were fabricators and erectors of structural steel. On the sale in 1931 of the business to Bethlehem Steel Company, he became plant manager of the "Hedden" works.

On May 8, 1928, he read an article about Oak Island in The New York Times Magazine. Hedden was fascinated by the story and determined to purchase the island and search for the treasure. He spent much of his fortune in search of the treasure. His search lasted from 1934 to 1936, when he helped arrange for New York University engineering professor Edwin Hamilton to take over. Hedden bought the east end of the island in 1935 and attempted to drain the so-called Money Pit with a pump. His discoveries during the search included finding an inscribed "H + O" stone, believed to be Knights Templar related, at Joudrey's Cove in 1936.
