= Buried treasure =

Literary trope

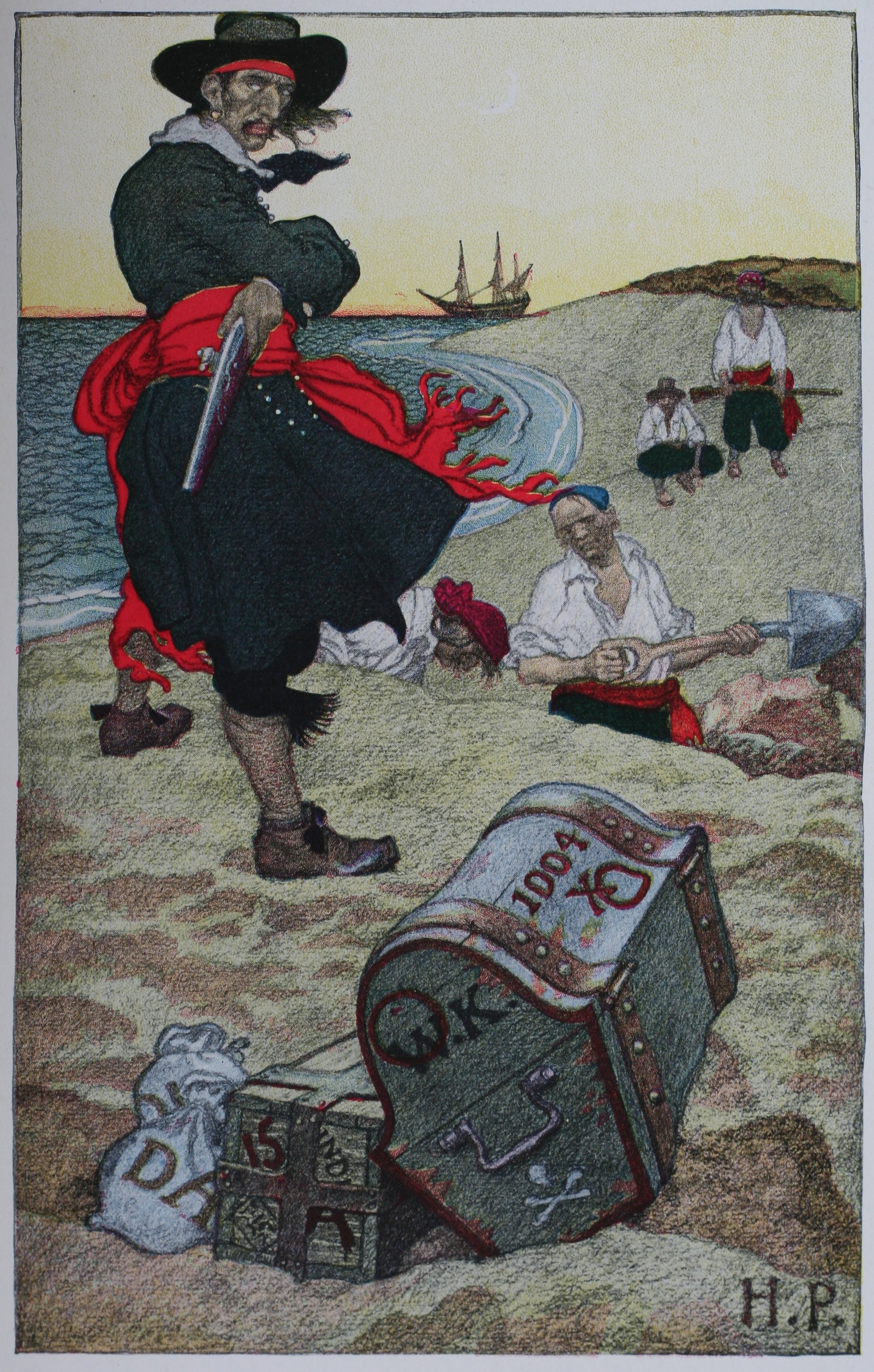
Illustration of pirates burying Captain Kidd's treasure, from Howard Pyle's Book of Pirates.

Buried treasure is a literary trope commonly associated with depictions of pirates, alongside Vikings, criminals, and outlaws in the Old West. According to popular conception, these people often buried their stolen fortunes in remote places, intending to return to them later (often with the use of a pirate's treasure map).

Pirates burying treasure was a rare occurrence, with one of the best known legends being William Kidd, who was accused of burying some of his wealth on Gardiners Island. The myth of buried pirate treasure was popularized by such 19th-century fiction as "Wolfert Webber" by Washington Irving, "The Gold-Bug" by Edgar Allan Poe, and Treasure Island by Robert Louis Stevenson. The idea of treasure maps leading to buried treasure is considered a fictional device.

There are cases of buried treasure from different historical periods, such as the Dacian king Decebalus and Visigoth king Alaric I, who both changed the course of rivers to hide their treasures. Legends of buried pirate treasure have existed for centuries, but authenticated discoveries are rare. For example, extensive excavations on Oak Island, Nova Scotia have not yielded any treasure.

Buried treasure is a cultural concept and not the same as a hoard, which is typically found by archaeologists and metal detectors. The Fenn treasure, reportedly buried by millionaire Forrest Fenn in 2010, was found in 2020 in Wyoming.

== Pirates ==
Pirates burying treasure was rare. The most well-known story of a pirate supposedly burying treasure was William Kidd, who is believed to have buried at least some of his wealth on Gardiners Island near Long Island before sailing into New York City. Kidd had originally been commissioned as a privateer for England, but his behavior had strayed into outright piracy, and he hoped that his treasure could serve as a bargaining chip in negotiations to avoid punishment. His bid was unsuccessful, however, and Kidd was hanged as a pirate. However, Kidd was not the only pirate thought to have done so.

In 1665 Governor Thomas Modyford of Jamaica wrote of returning buccaneers that "The Spanish prizes have been inventoried and sold, but the privateers plunder them and hide the goods in holes and creeks, so that the present orders [to return stolen Spanish goods] little avail the Spaniard."

Regarding a 1703 deposition about the loss of pirate Thomas Tew's sloop Amity, a pardoned pirate testified that "It was said when he was at Rhoad Island that the money they had for the part owners of the Amity was buried in the ground." (Note: The St. Augustine Pirate & Treasure Museum in St. Augustine, Florida claims to have the only authenticated treasure chest in the United States, which supposedly belonged to Tew. The chest's provenance is not clear.)

A 1709 report to Parliament notes in regards to "certain pyrates" (probably referring to the rumours circulating about Henry Every) that "[T]hough their treasure has been all got by robbery, yet since it can never be restored to the owners, having been taken (mostly, if not wholly) from the subjects of the Great Mogull, etc., and now lies buried or useless in or near Madagascar, it's much better they should be permitted to bring it to England with safety, where it may do good, etc."

According to the unreliable A General History of the Pyrates, pirate John Rackham was said to have buried his treasure shortly before his capture. This story was not present in his trial transcript. "Accordingly they parted, and Rackham made for the Island of Princes, and having great Quantities of rich Goods on Board, taken in the late Prizes, they were divided into Lots, and he and his Crew shared them by throwing Dice, the highest Cast being to choose first: When they had done, they packed up their Goods in Casks, and buried them on Shore in the Island of Princes, that they might have Room for fresh Booty."

Clement Downing's 1737 Compendious History contains the following story about a supposed buried treasure stash belonging to Blackbeard:

This Anthony told me, he had been amongst the Pyrates, and that he belong'd to one of the Sloops in Virginia, when Blackbeard was taken. He informed me, that if it should be my lot ever to go to York River or Maryland, near an Island called Mulberry Island, provided we went on thore at the Watering Place, where the Shipping used most commonly to ride, that there the Pyrates had buried considerable Sums of Money in great Chests, well clamp'd with Iron Plates. As to my part, I never was that way, nor much acquainted with any that ever used thofe Parts: But I have made Enquiry, and am inform'd there is fuch a Place as Mulberry Island. If any Person, who uses those Parts, should think it worth while to dig a little way at the upper End of a small sandy Cove, where it is convenient to land, he would soon find whether the Information I had was well grounded. Fronting the Landing-place are five Trees, amongst which, he said, the Money was hid. I cannot warrant the Truth of this Account; but if I was ever to go there, I would by some means or other satisty myself, as it could not be a great deal out of my way."

The Gentlemen's Magazine (Vol 35 Iss. 8, 1765) claimed without elaboration that "A considerable treasure has lately been discovered in the island of Blanco, in the West-Indies, said to have been buried there by the famous pyrate Blackbeard."

In English fiction, there are three well-known stories that helped to popularize the myth of buried pirate treasure: "Wolfert Webber" (1824) by Washington Irving, "The Gold-Bug" (1843) by Edgar Allan Poe and Treasure Island (1883) by Robert Louis Stevenson. These stories differ widely in plot and literary treatment but are all based on the William Kidd legend. David Cordingly states that "The effect of Treasure Island on our perception of pirates cannot be overestimated" and that the idea of treasure maps leading to buried treasure "is an entirely fictional device". Stevenson's Treasure Island was directly influenced by Irving's "Wolfert Webber," Stevenson saying in his preface, "It is my debt to Washington Irving that exercises my conscience, and justly so, for I believe plagiarism was rarely carried farther... the whole inner spirit and a good deal of the material detail of my first chapters... were the property of Washington Irving."

In 1911, American author Ralph D. Paine conducted a survey of many stories of buried treasure and published them in The Book of Buried Treasure. He found a common trait in all the stories: there was always a lone survivor of a piratical crew who somehow preserved a chart showing where the treasure was buried, but unable to return himself, he transfers the map or information to a friend or shipmate, usually on his deathbed. This person would then go search in vain for the treasure, but not before transferring the legend down to another hapless seeker.

== Cases ==
The Roman historian Dio Cassius says that, in the early 2nd century, the Dacian king Decebalus had changed the course of the river Sargetia and buried tons of gold and silver in the riverbed. Later, he ordered the river to be restored, and the slaves involved in the works to be executed. However, one of his nobles revealed the treasure's location to the Romans. The Byzantine historian Jordanes tells a similar story of the burial of the Visigoth king Alaric I and his treasure under the river Busento in 410. The burial places of the Khazar kings (qoruq) and other inner Asian people were also under a rerouted river.

There are a number of reports of supposed buried pirate treasure that surfaced much earlier than these works, indicating that the idea was around for more than a century before those stories were published. For example, extensive excavation has taken place on Oak Island (in Nova Scotia) since 1795 in the belief that one or more pirate captains had hidden large amounts of valuables there. These excavations were said to have been prompted by still older legends of buried pirate treasure in the area. No treasure has yet been reported found.

The Treasure of Lima is a supposed buried treasure on Cocos Island in the Pacific abandoned by pirates. The treasure, estimated to be worth £160 million, was stolen by British Captain William Thompson in 1820 after he was entrusted to transport it from Peru to Mexico.

Pirate Olivier Levasseur, also known as "The Buzzard" (La Buse), was rumored to have hidden treasure before his death in 1730. No such treasure has been found. Piracy historians confirm that the story of La Buse's lost treasure is a 20th century fiction.

During the 1666 Great Fire of London, wealthy residents of the city buried luxury goods such as gold and wine in the ground to protect them from the raging flames above. Samuel Pepys, the noted diarist, buried a wheel of cheese in his garden to protect it from the fire.

Buried treasure is not the same as a hoard, of which there have been thousands of examples found by archaeologists and metal detectors. Buried treasure is as much a cultural concept as an objective thing. It is related to pirates and other criminals who leave stolen artifacts behind for later retrieval, typically in remote places like islands, sometimes with maps leading back to the treasure.

The Fenn treasure was reportedly buried by millionaire Forrest Fenn around 2010 and found in 2020, somewhere in Wyoming.

== See also ==
- Chest (furniture)
- Confederate gold
- Entierro
- List of missing treasures
- Oak Island
- Treasure hunting
- Treasure of Guarrazar
