= Urban Wrestling Federation =

Defunct American independent professional wrestling promotion

- Acronym: UWF
- Founded: 2011
- Defunct: 2012
- Style: Professional wrestling
- Headquarters: New York City, New York, United States
- Founder: Steve Karel
- Owner: Steve Karel

The Urban Wrestling Federation (UWF) was an independent professional wrestling promotion located in New York City, New York and founded by former Extreme Championship Wrestling (ECW) producer Steve Karel.

== History ==
In the May 29, 2000 issue of the Brandweek magazine, plans were revealed for the Urban Wrestling Federation which aimed to combine hip-hop with professional wrestling and attract black and hispanic audiences. However, this would not materialize when on February 15, 2011, Steve Karel announced the launch of the Urban Wrestling Federation in partnership with record label Entertainment One Music to handle production and promotional work for their shows. In addition to Entertainment One, the UWF also partnered with urban contemporary radio station WQHT to market their events locally throughout the New York metropolitan area.

On May 4, 2011, UWF announced that their debut pay-per-view would be titled First Blood with two more pay-per-view events taking place on June 3, 2011 at the Hammerstein Ballroom. The tapings also featured rappers Brisco, Uncle Murda, Melle Mel, Billy Blue, 40 Glocc, and Cuban Link along with Block Entertainment owner Russell Spencer. The first pay-per-view titled First Blood aired on June 26, 2011 on various cable and satellite pay-per-view providers with the main event being Homicide fighting against Eddie Kingston in a semi final match in a tournament to decide the inaugural UWF Street King Champion. The promotion boasted some of the top wrestlers on the East Coast independent circuit including, most notably, Homicide, Eddie Kingston, Ricky Reyes and Slyck Wagner Brown. Homicide chose to leave Ring of Honor to sign an exclusive contract with the UWF. In September 2011, the UWF released a mixtape featuring Rick Ross and his Triple C's group, DJ Self, and the L.E.P. Bogus Boys.

In June 2016, UWF programming became available on pay-per-view and video on demand channels in the United States. On February 26, 2021, the UWF's programming through Stonecutter Media was made available on Pluto TV and Tubi for on demand viewing.

== Championships ==
Championship	Champion	Notes
UWF Street King Championship	Rasche Brown	The heavyweight title of the UWF. It was established in 2011 and was defended through the year. Rasche Brown was the only champion
