= J. Hutton Pulitzer =

American businessman and conspiracy theorist

Jovan Hutton Pulitzer
- Born: Jeffry Jovan Philyaw
- Occupation: Entrepreneur
- Known for: CueCat
- Website: jovanhuttonpulitzer.org

Jovan Hutton Pulitzer (self-styled as Commander Pulitzer and formerly Jeffry Jovan Philyaw) is an American entrepreneur and treasure hunter from Dallas, Texas, who invented the widely-criticized CueCat barcode scanner and "kinematic artifact detection" technology to supposedly find folds and bamboo fibers in election ballots as part of Republican efforts to overturn the 2020 US Presidential election. His marketing involved the defunct online show Net Talk Live! and selling crystals.

== Marketing ==
From 1994–1995 he was a marketing executive at Internet America in Dallas. Known mononymously as Jovan, during the late 1990s he was a marketer and infomercial producer who ran the Dallas company Digital Convergence, saying he worked on Susan Powter's marketing campaign and promoting Tripledge Wipers. He launched and co-hosted Net Talk Live from 1996 to 2001, a "triplecast" show about the internet that was broadcast on radio, TV, and online using RealAudio. It lasted 266 episodes and claimed to have a weekly reach of over 800 million households. The Dallas Morning News said they "do know something about computers, but spend most of the time laughing and talking about things such as where they had dinner last week."

== CueCat ==
As the chairman and chief executive officer of Digital Convergence, Pulitzer released the CueCat, a wired, handheld device that scanned barcodes printed in newspapers and other publications to allow readers to go directly to linked content on the then-nascent web without typing in the URL. Despite investments of $185 million from Radio Shack, Coca Cola, General Motors, Belo, and others, it was a commercial failure and sales never recovered after the discovery of a major security flaw and privacy breaches in 2000. It was one of the most ridiculed products of the dotcom era, and he changed his name following its failure.

== Intellectual property ==
He went on to run a patent holding company in Dallas. His company J. Hutton Pulitzer and Co. in the mid 2000s sold bottled rainwater under the brand Purain and crystals for over $100,000. He claimed to have filed over 100 patents and to be the most prolific inventor since Thomas Edison.

== Treasure hunting ==
In 2016, Pulitzer appeared as a treasure hunter on The Curse of Oak Island on the History Channel. He searched for the Ark of the Covenant and working with amateur historians from the Ancient Artifact Preservation Society he claimed that a sword found in the waters off Oak Island in Nova Scotia had "magical magnetic properties" and was evidence of Roman presence in North America and contact with the Miꞌkmaq, which a historian of that people dismissed. An archaeologist and a science writer criticized Pulitzer's claim, suggested the sword was a replica said that Pulitzer threatened to sue them.

== Election audit ==
For the Arizona Audit, Pulitzer claimed to have invented a system known as a "kinematic marker" that purportedly indicates if a piece of paper has been handled, folded, or processed in the mail, and he claimed to have tested the technology on over 2 million ballots. Pulitzer claimed that the technology could determine whether the ink used on the Maricopa County ballots came from human beings or machines. He claimed that examinations of the folds in the ballots would determine whether they were actually mailed to voters because fraudulently manufactured ballots that weren’t mailed would be devoid of certain physical markers. Doug Logan, the owner and CEO of Cyber Ninjas, which oversaw the audit, told Arizona State Senate liaison to the audit Ken Bennett that he consulted with Pulitzer while designing the process used to test the ballots. When asked about his claims and history, Pulitzer told the Arizona Mirror that he could not discuss anything about his technology or its past uses, including where it was done, because it was subject to a non-disclosure agreement for detecting fraudulent ballots. In October 2022, Pulitzer released a book detailing how the technology works, which he sold for $250 per copy. Amazon reviewers claimed it was a “pseudo-sci grift” packed with content already available elsewhere, and even David Clements - who believes that the 2020 Presidential Election was fraudulent - agreed, claiming that Pulitzer was hurting the audit cause by packaging his information in a typo-ridden book that’s “clear as mud” and in a video response to Pulitzer's work held up his copy of Pulitzer’s book, which had a typo, “Kinematic Artifac Detection,” written on its spine. Pulitzer told The Daily Beast that he deliberately set the price high so he could make copies for himself while preventing people from buying the book.

There was no evidence that Pulitzer's "kinematic marker" detection system ever worked, nor had Pulitzer any prior elections-related work prior to his being hired to work on the audit, nor was there clear evidence that his technology had ever been used on ballots before, nor was there any independent confirmation of its efficacy. In his report, Pulitzer alleged that ballots were printed in foreign countries including Chinese ballots containing bamboo were part of the claimed fraud, that ballots were counterfeit, and that bleed-through caused large-scale problems. Pulitzer charged $210,000 for his report, cutting his original fee of $2.1 million by 90%.

Shiva Ayyadurai, who also believed that the 2020 General Election had fraud, and who also worked on the audit and reviewed the report by Pulitzer, not only recommended that the Senate not publish Pulitzer's report but also stated that Pulitzer should face criminal investigation for fraud. Ayyadurai expressed these concerns and conclusions over a February 3, 2022 email to State Senators Karen Fann and Randy Pullen: “It is filled with blatant prevarications that demand either a full blown criminal investigation of fraud of the author of this rubbish or at minimum complete disassociation from him to ensure integrity of the election integrity efforts and to honor those who are truly doing the real work to identify real problems." Pulitzer threatened possible legal action against the Arizona Senate in January 2022, alleging that it had infringed on his intellectual copyrights by sharing ballot images with Ayyadurai.

Prior to the audit results and publication of the report's poor review by Ayyadurai, Senator Fann's own internal research for selecting the audit team noted "Credibility questionable" when it came to Pulitzer, despite having come recommended to her office by "several people." When the Cyber Ninjas and other IT contractors sanctioned by the Senate Republicans issued their findings in September 2021, the state legislators did not include Pulitzer’s forgery theory or analysis on its webpage. Nor did they invite him to present his findings in any forum.

The Georgia Secretary of State's office issued a statement rejecting a claim by Pulitzer to have hacked Georgia's voting system. Brad Raffensperger also said his allegation was false and dismissed Pulitzer as a “failed inventor and failed treasure hunter.”

== Works ==
Pulitzer claimed without evidence to have written 300 books on history. His books include How to Cut Off Your Arm and Eat Your Dog: Plus, Other Recipes for Survival.

== Personal life ==
Pulitzer said he began in marketing aged 9, selling rabbit meat to restaurants. He is divorced.
