= Marty Lagina =

American engineer and television star

- Born: Martin Lagina; August 26, 1955 (age 70); Kingsford, Michigan, U.S.
- Education: Michigan Technological University; University of Michigan (J.D.)
- Occupations: Engineer, vintner, television producer

Martin Lagina (/ləˈɡiːnə/ lə-GEE-nə, born August 26, 1955) is an engineer, vintner, and star and producer of The Curse of Oak Island.

Lagina attended Michigan Technological University. After graduating, he became a petroleum engineer for Amoco. While pursuing his Doctor of Law at the University of Michigan, he did engineering consulting for petroleum companies. In 1982, he founded Terra Energy Ltd. He sold Terra to CMS Energy for $58 million in 1995 and founded Heritage Sustainable Energy.

When he was eleven years old, he learned about the story of buried treasure on Oak Island in a 1965 copy of Reader's Digest, which he had borrowed from the school library. His and his brother Rick Lagina's interest in the island endured into adulthood, and they eventually visited and later acquired partial ownership of Oak Island. Their ongoing search for the treasure is depicted on The Curse of Oak Island.

Lagina and his family started Mari Vineyard in 1999 in Traverse City, Michigan. The winery is named after his Italian grandmother and features an enclosed tower atop walls of Upper Peninsula dolomitic limestone.
