= The Curse of Oak Island =

American reality television series

- Genre: Reality
- Created by: Kevin Burns
- Narrated by: Robert Clotworthy; James Thornton
- Composers: Daniel Suett; The Music Collective; Kieran Kiely
- Country of origin: United States
- Original language: English
- No. of seasons: 14
- No. of episodes: 280 (list of episodes)

Production
- Executive producers: Kevin Burns; Jon A. Levy; Joe Lessard; David Comtois; Paul Buccieri; Brian Bowers; Kim Egan
- Camera setup: Multiple
- Running time: 60 minutes
- Production company: Prometheus Entertainment

Original release
- Network: History
- Release: January 5, 2014 – present

Related
- The Curse of Civil War Gold; Beyond Oak Island; The Secret of Skinwalker Ranch

The Curse of Oak Island is a multi-season reality television series that chronicles a team of treasure hunters run by brothers Marty and Rick Lagina and its ongoing search, started in 2005 (following 200 years of searching by others), for legendary treasure on Oak Island off the shore of Nova Scotia. The American television production delves into the Oak Island mystery, featuring efforts to search for historical artifacts and treasure.

The program premiered on History on January 6, 2014. The fourteenth season premiered November 10, 2026.

== Premise ==
The Curse of Oak Island follows brothers Marty and Rick Lagina, originally from Kingsford, Michigan, through their efforts to find the speculated treasure believed to be on Oak Island. The series discusses the history of the island, recent discoveries, theories, and earlier investigations of the site. Areas of interest include the "money pit", Borehole 10-X, Smith's Cove, Site 2, "Nolan's Cross", the "Hatch", and the "Swamp".

=== Notable finds ===
While wholesale treasure has not been found, some coins and artifacts have been dug up on the island over the years.

- A Spanish copper coin, believed to be dated to the 17th century
- A fake Roman sword
- A supposed 12th-century manuscript
- A small piece of material that may be a piece of an old book, a related bookbinder, and a piece of sheepskin parchment with markings that looked like medieval text on it
- A human bone fragment of Middle Eastern ancestry
- A lead cross with a square hole at the top from between 1200 and the 17th century in origin
- A rhodolite garnet brooch of 400–500 years in age
- A metal hinge
- A claimed Roman era shipwreck, just off Oak Island, unauthenticated as of 2016
- Ring bolts
- Ox-shoes
- A metal panel
- A carved stone slab similar to some on the surface and one dug up in 1804

After centuries of excavation on the small island, some have speculated the show is a hoax and false news, while others speculate that if there ever was any treasure, it is already gone.

== Personnel ==
=== Oak Island characters ===
Initially, the cast consisted of a core group including Rick, Marty, and Alex Lagina, Dan and Dave Blankenship, Craig Tester, Jack Begley, Dan Henskee, Charles Barkhouse, and Peter Fornetti. Over time, the Oak Island team has expanded. Some specialists who have been brought to the island for specific purposes, such as Terry Matheson, Laird Niven, and Gary Drayton, have joined the team as full-time members.

- Rick Lagina: Brother of Marty, Rick is a retired postal worker who is the main driving force behind the project. At the age of eleven, he read an article about the Oak Island money pit in the January 1965 edition of Reader's Digest and got Marty, his younger brother, interested in the Oak Island mystery. In 2006, he and Marty purchased most of Oak Island.
- Marty Lagina: Rick Lagina's younger brother who funds a large proportion of the project. He owns a vineyard in his home town of Traverse City, Michigan. He is a certified diver and is featured prominently in the spin-off The Curse of Civil War Gold.
- Dan Blankenship (seasons 1–6): A treasure seeker on Oak Island for nearly 50 years, Dan was first attracted to the island after reading the same Reader's Digest article that Rick and Marty Lagina did. Dan was responsible for drilling borehole 10–X and had dived to the bottom of the 235-foot-deep (72 m) shaft, the deepest shaft on the island. In season 1, he was 90 years old and did not take an active part in the search but was often sought out by team members for his extensive knowledge. He died in 2019 at age 95, prior to the filming of season 7.
- Dave Blankenship: Son of Dan Blankenship who has been helping his father on the island since the 1970s. Dave is one of only three permanent inhabitants of Oak Island. He is partially paralysed on the left side due to an industrial accident.
- Craig Tester: The business partner of Marty Lagina, father of Drake Tester and stepfather of Jack Begley; he is an engineer.
- Jack Begley: Stepson of Craig Tester, Jack tends to take on the dirtier jobs on the island, such as manually searching the spoils from various shafts, manual digging, and even walking through the swamp.
- Alex Lagina: The son of Marty, he is a qualified diver and is featured prominently in season 2 of the spin-off The Curse of Civil War Gold.
- Dan Henskee: One of only three Oak Island treasure hunters who have been searching the island for several decades. He initially came to the island to help Dan Blankenship in his search.
- Charles Barkhouse: An Oak Island historian who also acts as a tour guide for Oak Island Tours, the company that owns most of the island. Charles is a freemason.
- Peter Fornetti: Rick and Marty's nephew.
- David Fornetti: Rick and Marty's nephew who appeared in one episode of season 1 but was credited as being part of the Oak Island team; became a regular in season 8.
- William Castedo: David Fornetti's friend who only appeared in one episode of season 1, but was credited as being part of the Oak Island team.
- Paul Troutman (season 2–): A researcher and the son of a man who worked with Robert Dunfield alongside Dan Blankenship in the 1960s.
- Drake Tester (season 2–4): Son of Craig Tester and stepbrother of Jack Begley, Drake died in March 2017.
- Fred Nolan (season 3): A land surveyor who first came to Oak Island in 1958, he was a landowner and treasure hunter on the island until his death in 2016. For much of that time, he was involved in a feud with Dan Blankenship until he was convinced to join the team in season 3. Like Blankenship, his advanced age prevented him from taking a more active role in the hunt, but he still provided a wealth of information to the team, and his maps continued to assist the team after his death. He died before season 4 aired and did not appear during the season. It is revealed in "Drilling Down – The Truth Behind The Curse" that he never spent a night on Oak Island, despite having a house there.
- Doug Crowell (season 4–): A researcher who introduces the team to Zena Halpern. He is normally employed at the Centre of Geographic Sciences in Lawrencetown, Nova Scotia, and is seen there during some episodes.
- Billy Gerhardt (season 4–): A heavy equipment operator who starts conducting most of the heavy digging in season 4. He has his own business called Gerhardt Property Improvement in Lunenburg, and his trucks and other machinery are often seen at the money pit and Smith's Cove areas of Oak Island.
- Terry Matheson (season 5–): A local geologist who joins the team to analyze cuttings and cores from the various boreholes on the island. He later takes part in the excavation of Smith's Cove.
- Laird Niven (season 5–): A local archaeologist who first appears in "Always Forward", he joins the team officially in season 5 after the province of Nova Scotia's Department of Communities, Culture and Heritage insists on archaeological oversight.
- Gary Drayton (recurring seasons 2, 4, team member season 5–): A metal detecting expert from the UK. Although he appeared in seasons 2 and 4, he did not become a permanent member of the team until sometime in season 5. He has also appeared on the spin-off The Curse of Civil War Gold.
- Steve Guptill (season 6–): A local surveyor, he is first brought in to compile years of data in order to find the precise location of shaft 6. Later, he is seen most places where accurate coordinates are required.
- Tom Nolan (season 7): Son of Fred Nolan, he is first seen in season 5 and helps the team but does not become a fully fledged member until the beginning of season 7.
- Scott Barlow (season 7): The Oak Island Tours Inc. project manager, he appears in several episodes in season 7.
- Miriam Amirault (Season 8–10): an archaeology assistant to Laird Niven, she appeared in Episode 8 of Season 8. Miss Amirault left the series during Season 10.

=== Recurring appearances ===
A number of individuals have made recurring appearances, usually when their expertise is called upon in association with the treasure hunt. They may appear many times in one season and then far more infrequently in other seasons or not at all, depending on what is required during the ongoing search.

- Tony Sampson: A local resident and professional dive master. Like Charles Barkhouse, he is a freemason and is usually involved when there is a need to explore the waters around Oak Island or operate underwater in the island's triangle shaped swamp. However, he does appear at other times as well.
- Brian Abbott (seasons 2–4): A sonar expert who is periodically called in to conduct sonar scans of boreholes on the island and who has also scanned the cavern at the bottom of borehole 10–X. Although he only appears in only a limited number of episodes, the narrator explains in The Curse of Civil War Gold that he has been helping the Oak Island team "for the past six years".
- Dr. Christa Brosseau (seasons 3, 5–): A chemist at Saint Mary's University in Halifax who is often called on to analyse artifacts found on the island.
- Mike Huntley (seasons 3–5): A local diver who dived borehole C–1 and has at times partnered with Tony Sampson and John Chatterton for other dives
- Zena Halpern (seasons 4–5): A New York-based researcher who gives the team some ancient maps and has a theory that the Knights Templar were involved in the Oak Island mystery. When she dies in season 6, she bequeaths all of her research to Rick Lagina, which results in the Oak Island Research Centre being opened.
- Andrew Folkins (seasons 4–5): The Irving Equipment project manager at the money pit.
- Vanessa Lucido (seasons 4–): CEO of ROC Equipment, a company partnered with Irving Equipment to drive caissons into the money pit area.
- Mike Jardine (seasons 5–): A piling superintendent from Irving Equipment.
- Danny Smith (seasons 5–): A member of the ROC Equipment crew, Danny is normally seen at the money pit area supervising drilling.
- Alex Gauthier (seasons 6, 7): A former professional footballer, Alex is a representative of Eagle Canada, a geophysical exploration company that conducts seismic testing on Oak Island.
- Brennan McMahon (seasons 6–7): A representative of Choice Drilling, a company that uses sonic drilling to take cores in the money pit area and later the triangle-shaped swamp.
- Carmen Legge (seasons 6–): A blacksmith at Ross Farm Museum in New Ross, Nova Scotia, Carmen is often called upon to appraise iron artifacts found during the search on Oak Island.
- Dr. Ian Spooner (seasons 7–): A professor of Earth and environmental science at Acadia University in Wolfville, Nova Scotia, with 20-years' experience in wetland geology, he visits the island many times in season 7 to conduct research on the triangle-shaped swamp at the request of the team. He has also regularly appeared in Season 8, to help the team investigate the stone pathway in the swamp.
- Helen Sheldon (season 9–): An archeologist who helps with artifact research and data collection, as well as performs archeological digs at various locations on the island.
- Emma Culligan (seasons 10-): An archaeometallurgist with degrees in archaeology, engineering, and metallurgy from Memorial University in St John's, Newfoundland and Labrador. She runs the XRV system on Oak Island.

=== Other appearances ===
In addition to regular and recurring cast members, there have been several visits by people who have a significant and sometimes intimate association with Oak Island.

- Lee Lamb (seasons 1, 4–5): Daughter of treasure hunter Robert Restall who died in an accident in 1965 with his son and Lee's brother, Robert Jr, and two other men. When she visits the island, she usually brings something of significance with her.
- Andrew Demont (season 1): The only survivor of the accident that killed Robert Restall and three others.
- David MacDonald (season 3): The author who wrote the January 1965 Reader's Digest story that first attracted Dan Blankenship and Marty and Rick Lagina to Oak Island. He contributes a copy of the January 1965 Reader's Digest to a time capsule that is buried next to the Oak Island bicentennial memorial.
- Joan, Jean and Joyce McGinnis (seasons 3–4): Three sisters who are direct descendants of Daniel McGinnis, the original discoverer of the money pit. On their first visit they show the team a small cross that is allegedly part of the original Oak Island treasure. Joyce died in 2017 and, in season 4, Joan and Jean return to the island to inter some of her ashes in the foundation of what was once the home of Daniel McGinnis.
- Randall Sullivan (seasons 4, 6): An author and investigative journalist who once wrote an article about the Oak Island search for Rolling Stone magazine and is now writing a book about the treasure hunt. He works with the team in conducting research and compiling data offering his theories based on his own extensive research. In season 6, he presents Marty and Rick with the two signed copies of his book.
- Rick Restall (season 5): Son of treasure hunter Robert Restall and brother of Lee Lamb, returns to the island in season 5 with his sister.

== Background and production ==
=== Development ===
The Lagina brothers became fascinated with the island after reading the January 1965 issue of Reader's Digest magazine that features an article on the Restall family's work to investigate the so-called "money pit". Marty and Rick obtained a controlling interest in Oak Island Tours, which reportedly owns most of the island. The brothers were later approached by Prometheus Entertainment to do a reality show and engaged the assistance of father-and-son Dan and Dave Blankenship, permanent residents of the island who had likewise been searching for treasure since the 1960s.

=== Theories ===
The series explores various Oak Island theories and conjectures through conversations with independent researchers. Persons featured have included Zena Halpern discussing her theory about North African gold and sharing copies of a French map of the island that she claims is dated to 1347, J. Hutton Pulitzer discussing his theory of ancient mariner visitations, Petter Amundsen discussing his theory about codes hidden in Shakespearean literature and a secret project involving Sir Francis Bacon and the Rosicrucians, Daniel Ronnstam discussing his theory about the 90-foot stone being a dual cypher containing instructions on how to defeat the money pit flood tunnels with corn, authors Kathleen McGowen and Alen Butler discussing their theory involving the fabled Knights Templar treasure and an alleged relocation of historical religious artifacts to the island, and John O'Brien discussing his theory that the island contains treasures of the Aztec Empire. It has also been suggested by Zena Halpern, without evidence, that the Templars worshipped the Phoenician goddess Tanit.

== Release ==
=== Series overview ===
Season	Episodes	Originally released	
Season	Episodes	First released	Last released
1	5	January 5, 2014	February 9, 2014
2	10	November 4, 2014	January 13, 2015
3	13	November 10, 2015	February 2, 2016
4	16	November 15, 2016	February 21, 2017
5	16	November 7, 2017	March 6, 2018
6	22	November 13, 2018	May 7, 2019
7	23	November 2, 2019	April 28, 2020
8	25	November 10, 2020	May 4, 2021
9	25	November 2, 2021	May 3, 2022
10	25	November 15, 2022	May 16, 2023
11	25	November 7, 2023	April 30, 2024
12	25	November 12, 2024	May 20, 2025
13	25	November 4, 2025	May 2026

=== Online media ===
Along with The Curse of Oak Island being broadcast on History, the series can also be streamed on the television channel's website. On February 1, 2022, the show's eighth season could be streamed on Discovery+. February 1, 2023 marked the ninth season appearing on the subscription-based streaming service.

=== Home media ===
Name	No. of episodes	Release dates		
Name	No. of episodes	Region 1	Region 2	Region 4
Season 1	5	September 9, 2014	—N/a	—N/a
Season 2	10	October 20, 2015	—N/a	—N/a
Season 4	16	September 17, 2019	—N/a	—N/a
Season 5	16	September 17, 2019	—N/a	—N/a
Season 6	22	November 12, 2019	—N/a	—N/a
The First Six Seasons	82	December 10, 2019	—N/a	—N/a

== Series spin-offs and extended episodes ==
=== The Curse of Oak Island: Drilling Down ===
The Curse of Oak Island: Drilling Down premiered on November 10, 2015, as a companion series following the parent show's season 3 episode "The Hole Truth". The series is a talk show where host Matty Blake, brothers Marty and Rick Lagina, and guests discuss specific details about previous episodes and the future of the search for Oak Island treasure. Guests are invited to the roundtable and interviewed about their research, knowledge, and Oak Island experiences.

=== The Curse of Civil War Gold ===
Season one of History's The Curse of Civil War Gold debuted on March 6, 2018. In the spin-off series, Kevin Dykstra, Marty Lagina, and Marty's son, Alex Lagina, hunt for Confederate gold which disappeared during the American Civil War.

=== Behind the Dig ===
During the beginning of The Curse of Oak Island's sixth season (2018), Behind the Dig appeared as deep-dive episodes where Matty Blake, the Lagina brothers, and the Oak Island team present the viewers with behind-the-scenes footage of the treasure hunt and describe the processes the team uses in their findings.

=== The Curse of Oak Island: Digging Deeper ===
First airing on History on January 8, 2019, the Digging Deeper extended episodes exhibit the parent series' unseen footage and discuss further information about the island's discoveries.

=== Beyond Oak Island ===
Beyond Oak Island, which premiered on November 17, 2020, showcases treasure hunts from all across the world. Host Matty Blake and the Laginas discuss past and present searches, sometimes traveling to the sites for a first-hand involvement. The show ended after 3 seasons in January 2023.

==== Episodes ====
Season	Episodes	Originally released	
Season	Episodes	First released	Last released
1	8	November 17, 2020	January 26, 2021
2	8	January 4, 2022	March 15, 2022
3	12	October 4, 2022	January 31, 2023

=== Tales From Oak Island ===
Premiered on November 19, 2024, and ended in 2025 after 8 programs, it is a deep dive into the treasure hunt.

== Other media ==
=== Video games ===
On May 13, 2015, Visionaire Studio announced they had received 50% of needed funds for The Mystery of Oak Island by posting on their Kickstarter page. As of February 2026, the puzzle game is still in development.

=== Books ===
Editor, journalist, and author Randall Sullivan wrote The Curse of Oak Island: The Story of the World's Longest Treasure Hunt, documenting Oak Island's long history of treasure hunters and their successes and tribulations on and off the island. The book was first published in November 2018 by Atlantic Monthly Press.
