= Confederate gold =

Hidden caches of gold lost after the American Civil War

Millions of dollars' worth of gold was lost or unaccounted for during the American Civil War in the 1860s. Allegedly, some of this gold was hidden by the Confederate treasury in the hope that the South would rise again, or simply so that the Union would not gain possession of it. The existence and location of this Confederate gold have been a source of speculation for many historians and treasure hunters.

== Origin of the legend ==
When Union forces were on the verge of invading New Orleans, Confederate authorities quickly removed millions of dollars of gold to a "safer" location – the city of Columbus, Georgia. The gold was temporarily stored at the Iron Bank by William H. Young. On October 11, 1862, General P. G. T. Beauregard was ordered to take the gold from Young's bank in Columbus. Young refused to release it, but was compelled to do so by force. According to Beauregard's biography, "What became of that coin is a mystery."

=== Halleck's allegations ===
Amid the collapse of the Confederacy, General Henry Halleck, Chief of Staff of the Union armies, wrote on April 26, 1865, that Jefferson Davis, president of the Confederacy, was fleeing with large quantities of specie. Halleck stated that Richmond, Virginia bankers estimated specie valued "from six to thirteen millions" were traveling south from Goldsboro, North Carolina in wagons. Halleck ordered Generals Wilson and Canby to intercept the rebel leaders and any wealth they were transporting.

Davis did, in effect, take what was left of the stable-value Confederate treasury with him, which consisted of $528,000 (equal to $11,105,217 today) in gold and silver bullion (some of it in Mexican silver coinage), when he and his cabinet fled Richmond on April 3, 1865, by train. However, the treasury increasingly became an encumbrance on his flight, and Davis had disbursed the treasury along the way, among others to General Joseph E. Johnston in order for him to pay his troops at Greensboro, North Carolina, and to several banks for safekeeping, with the remainder paid out to Joseph Wheeler's accompanying cavalry men before dismissing them from their duties. Davis had nothing on him when he was captured in the end on May 10 in Irwinville, Georgia.

=== Trenholm's embezzlement ===
George Trenholm, who was Confederate States Secretary of the Treasury for the last year of the Civil War, was arrested after the war and accused of making off with millions in Confederate assets. Trenholm had accompanied Davis on part of his flight but dropped out prematurely due to ill health, which was taken as circumstantial evidence by his Union accusers, when they later accused Trenholm of theft.

== In fiction ==
- In the Italian comic book Tex, Confederate gold was placed on board a Confederate river ironclad which ended up in the swamps around the Arkansas River. The gold was later found by members of the Ku Klux Klan who intended to use it to finance a new rebellion in the Southern United States. The ironclad, along with the gold, was destroyed in an explosion by Tex Willer.
- In the Franco-Belgian comic book series Blueberry (volumes "Chihuahua Pearl" through "Ballad for a Coffin"), $500,000 in Confederate gold bullion (being the historical end-of-war Confederate treasury as well) was smuggled to Mexico by a group of Confederate soldiers led by Colonel Trevor, the latter acting under orders from Confederate President Jefferson Davis to do so, and who buried the gold in the graveyard of the deserted village of Tacoma, Chihuahua state. The gold was later found by Juaristas who used it to finance their fight against Emperor Maximilian I of Mexico.
- A series of western adventure novels written by Paul Wheelahan (using the pseudonym E. Jefferson Clay) featured two brawling Civil War veterans searching for stolen Confederate gold.
- In the 1936 novel Gone with the Wind, Rhett Butler is rumored to have stolen the Confederate gold.
- In the 1966 spaghetti Western film The Good, the Bad and the Ugly, the protagonists get information about lost Confederate gold, worth $200,000, hidden in a grave at a cemetery.
- In the 1971 spaghetti Western film The Last Traitor, there is $200,000 worth of Confederate gold.
- In the 1994 film Timecop, a single traveler from the future hijacks a shipment of Confederate gold using advanced automatic weapons with laser sighting. This gold is mentioned later to be used in untraceable payment to terrorists in the 20th century.
- In the 2005 action film Sahara, Confederate gold was placed on board the CSS Texas which ended up in Africa. The gold was later found by Dirk Pitt.
- In the 2012 TV series Alcatraz, Confederate gold was hidden beneath Alcatraz prison by the warden in 1960 to be discovered in 2012.
- In the 2018 video game Red Dead Redemption 2, the Van Der Linde gang spends most of Chapter 3 seeking a supposed stash of Confederate gold from two feuding families.

== See also ==
- The Curse of Civil War Gold
- Nazi gold
- Yamashita's gold
- Great Kentucky Hoard
