= The Curse of Civil War Gold =

American documentary television series

- Genre: Reality
- Narrated by: Robert Clotworthy
- Country of origin: United States
- Original language: English
- No. of seasons: 2
- No. of episodes: 16

Production
- Camera setup: Multiple
- Running time: 42-43 minutes
- Production company: Prometheus Entertainment

Original release
- Network: History
- Release: March 6, 2018 – July 2, 2019

The Curse of Civil War Gold is a nonfiction reality television series on the History channel about the hunt for treasure from the American Civil War.

== Cast ==
=== Recurring and guests ===
- Gary Drayton – A Florida-based metal detecting expert who was recommended to the team based on his work on The Curse of Oak Island.
- Dave Van Farowe - Captain of the research vessel Neptune.
- John Chatterton and Howard Ehrenberg – A pair of divers who were called in when Kevin Dykstra was injured and was unable to dive. Chatterton is an experienced wreck diver who has made several dives into the boreholes on Oak Island
- Mark Holley - An underwater archaeologist who works with the team in season 2
- Larry Ring - Boat captain
- Brian Abbott - A sonar expert who uses a sector-scan sonar to map target areas for the team

== Overview ==
Based on a 100 year old deathbed confession from a local lighthouse keeper, Michigan native Kevin Dykstra and his team search for a cache of Civil War Gold, estimated to be worth around $140 million. Dykstra and his team join forces with Marty Lagina from The Curse of Oak Island to try to solve the mystery and find the lost gold.

== Episodes ==
Season	Episodes	Originally released	
Season	Episodes	First released	Last released
1	6	March 6, 2018	April 30, 2018
2	10	April 30, 2019	July 2, 2019

=== Season 1 (2018) ===
No. overall	No. in season	Title	Original release date
1	1	"Betrayal"	March 6, 2018
As he leaves Oak Island, Marty Lagina calls Kevin Dykstra, a Michigan treasure hunter, and arranges a meeting at Marty's vineyard in Traverse City, Michigan where Kevin and his colleagues, Brad Richards and Fred Monroe, present their evidence that US$2 million in gold (US$140 million in 2018 dollars) lies in a boxcar at the bottom of Lake Michigan. The gold had originally been escorted by Jefferson Davis but when he was captured the gold went missing. Marty says that he needs more evidence before he can commit financially. Kevin, his brother Al, and Brad Richards travel to Abbeville, Georgia where they retrace the last movements of Jefferson Davis before his capture. At the Michigan State University library, Fred Monroe and team member Jeff Zehr try to find information to help Kevin in Georgia. They find inconsistent information about Benjamin D. Pritchard, one of the soldiers involved in Davis' capture, and a map of Davis' camp. In Georgia the team travels to Irwinville, where Davis was captured. Assisted by Florida based metal detecting expert Gary Drayton they metal-detect a field and find wagon parts and a civil war silver coin. The finds are not yet sufficient for Marty to commit to the project.
2	2	"Right on Track"	March 13, 2018
The team decides to focus on how the missing gold got from Georgia to Muskegon, Michigan. Kevin believes that Benjamin Pritchard and Colonel Robert Minty turned to Charles Hackley for assistance and they arranged for a rail line to be constructed. The rail line was only used for 2 years, so Kevin and Al fly over the area to see if they can find it. They see what appears to be the buried train tracks and later scan the area with ground penetrating radar finding anomalies that may be train tracks. Down the beach, a large anomaly is found. Meanwhile, Fred Monroe examines old negatives of the area. He finds one that shows the train tracks. Back at the beach, a local Elks Lodge member shows the team some railroad spikes that he found in the area, and a photo showing an old locomotive in the water. Kevin suspects this may be a stolen locomotive used to transport the missing gold. Kevin arranges for a group of people to dig the beach. Water stops them exposing the locomotive or tracks, but Kevin is able to dig down and touch metal objects.
3	3	"In Plain Sight"	March 20, 2018
Kevin believes that the team should concentrate on Charles Hackley's involvement in the transport and laundering/re-minting of the gold. He presents an image of a park built by Hackley that he believes incorporated the Confederate flag. Surrounding the park are several buildings built by Hackley, and a statue in the park looks directly at a nearby clock tower. At the Hackley mausoleum, the team finds Templar crosses. Kevin believes that there are tunnels between two banks on either side of a road. At one of the banks the team is shown two old vaults, one of which is in the basement, and a wall with a loose fascia. While part of the team looks through old safety deposit boxes, other members knock down the loose brick, revealing a hole in the wall behind it. Kevin feels through the hole and finds wood, nails, and a latch. No further investigation is carried out. Nothing is found in the safety deposit boxes. It is revealed that Hackley owned gold mines in Utah.
4	4	"The Utah Connection"	March 27, 2018
Kevin and Brad travel to Delta, Utah to investigate gold supposedly found in the area. Local resident Scott Taylor claimed in 2005 that he found 280 gold bars with "U.S. Cavalry" stamped on them in a mine but he will not speak to anyone about the find. Kevin decides to search the area and does so when the rest of the team arrives. The search is unsuccessful. Although Marty says that he isn't completely convinced, he decides to finance the search.
5	5	"Overboard"	April 3, 2018
The team heads to Frankfort, Michigan where they visit the lighthouse from where a lighthouse keeper allegedly saw a boxcar pushed off a ferry. They then meet with Marty Lagina before heading to the boat that Marty had located for them. Once in the area where they think the boxcar is located, they use side-scan sonar to map the bottom of the lake. Meanwhile, Brad meets with a maritime historian to gather information on what would happen to a boxcar that was pushed off a ferry. Back on Lake Michigan, an object that resembles a boxcar is located. Next day, Kevin, Al, and Jeff dive the target but find that it is a more modern metal boxcar than the wooden one that they are looking for. Another target is located and they dive on it, but just as they reach it they run out of air and have to surface. By the time they are ready to dive again, the water has become more choppy and when Kevin jumps off the boat he collides with the dive platform, injuring himself. The boat returns to shore and Kevin is taken to hospital.
6	6	"All That Glitters"	April 30, 2018
After several hours, Kevin is discharged from hospital but he must use crutches and is unable to dive. Marty recommends bringing in John Chatterton, an experienced professional wreck diver, to help. Once at the dive site where Kevin was injured, Chatterton, his partner Howard Ehrenberg, Al Dykstra, and Jeff Zehr dive but visibility is poor and they are unable to locate the target. John and Howard decide to scan the bottom with a magnetometer and locate targets which they dive to, but it is buried too deeply to see. After being debriefed by John and Howard, who have to go home, Kevin decides to ignore their site and instead return to the site where Kevin was injured so they hire a new boat. Using a metal detector they find a target and recover a rivet, but have to return to the surface due to low air. Bad weather means they have to suspend diving for the season.

=== Season 2 (2019) ===
No. overall	No. in season	Title	Original release date
7	1	"The Return"	April 30, 2019
Alex Lagina joins the team with news that his father, Marty Lagina, has arranged a new boat for the search. Alex has also arranged for Mark Holley, a marine archaeologist, to help with the underwater search. Mark recommends using side-scan sonar to map the location of the target site accurately and then photograph it with a remotely operated vehicle (ROV). After doing that, Kevin, Mark and Al attempt to dive but Al overheats and the dive is aborted. After some rest, the dive is resumed and they reach what they think is a boxcar. The metal detector indicates there is non-ferrous metal just under the lake bottom. After their return to the surface, Mark recommends using a sector-scan sonar to accurately map the target. In the village of Benzonia, Brad and Jeff meet with a Civil War historian who presents them with first-hand accounts from Confederate soldiers confirming that Jefferson Davis was in possession of the Confederate treasury when he was arrested, was heading to Mexico and that Davis was escorting only a part of the Confederate treasury.
8	2	"Tunnel Visions"	May 7, 2019
The team travels to the boxcar dive site where sonar expert Brian Abbott uses a side-scan sonar mounted on a tripod to scan the area so that a detailed map can be created. They then move to the debris field and repeat the process. Rough seas result in diving being called off for the day. When the weather improves, the dive commences, aided by the sector-scan sonar. Numerous non-ferrous metal targets are identified but the team runs low on air and has to surface. In Muskegon, Brad and Jeff visit the home of a former bank employee at the Hackley Union National Bank. He claims there was a third, unofficial vault in the bank that contained bars of gold and tunnels connecting the bank to another bank and even the Hackley home. He shows them a house across the road from the Hackley house that he believes has a tunnel over to the Hackley house livery stable.
9	3	"A Void At All Cost"	May 14, 2019
In Kevin's workshop, Brian Abbott shows the team the mosaic that he created from the scans of the lake bottom. Brad and Kevin travel to the house that was identified as possibly having a tunnel under it, discovering that it was once the home of Thomas Hume, Charles Hackley's partner. In the basement they find evidence that there may be a tunnel behind a wall. Next day, Kevin and Al travel to Lansing to meet with state officials in an attempt to obtain a permit to dig at the bottom of Lake Michigan. Meanwhile Brad, Jeff and Fred are at the Grand Rapids Public Library looking for information linking participants in the gold theft and laundering. Later, Kevin and the team meet at a restaurant to discuss the day. The team then assembles at the Hume house so that they can scan the area with ground penetrating radar (GPR) to locate a possible tunnel. While the GPR scan is underway Kevin, Brad and Al investigate the basement. They find evidence of a tunnel behind a suspicious part of a brick wall. The GPR operator finds evidence of a collapsed tunnel that extends across the road towards the Hackley house.
10	4	"The Pritchard Connection"	May 21, 2019
Kevin, Al and Brad meet with Rob Proctor, the great-great-grandson of Benjamin Pritchard. He shows them artifacts that had been taken from Jefferson Davis when he was captured and confirms that he has heard rumours of tunnels and gold under the Pritchard house. After visiting the local museum, they inspect the Pritchard house. In the basement, Kevin notes that an area of the floor is brick while the rest is concrete, which he views as suspicious. While Gary Drayton metal detects the ground, GPR is used in the basement. Gary and Brad find a nail, a belt buckle, and a Confederate coin while in the basement, the GPR indicates the possibility of a tunnel. They remove the bricks and dig down, finding wood about 3 ft (1 m) down. Eventually they locate a coin in the hole about 4 ft (1 m) down. Back at the workshop Kevin updates Marty and Alex on their discoveries.
11	5	"Southern Comfort"	May 28, 2019
Kevin and Al travel to Brad's home where they meet a woman who is the descendant of a large plantation owner. She says that some Confederate gold was hidden there and some is still being found today. The team arrange for Brian Abbott to do additional sonar scans of the lake while Kevin, Al, and Brad are in Georgia with Alex Lagina and Gary Drayton. In Georgia, Gary metal detects along a creek finding parts of an old horseshoe, a square nail, a silver ring, a belt hanger and jewelry while Alex and Brad find a piece of jewelry. On Lake Michigan, a target is found and scanned. Jeff and another diver dive to the target and find objects that they think look like gold bars.
12	6	"Route Awakenings"	June 4, 2019
New evidence suggests that the stolen $140 million in Confederate gold may have been connected to the US President.
13	7	"The Plot Thickens"	June 11, 2019
A new theory suggests that the theft of the Confederate gold may have funded the assassination of Abraham Lincoln.
14	8	"Grave Expectations"	June 18, 2019
Evidence of gold from the arrest of Jefferson Davis convinces Kevin that his theory is correct.
15	9	"Debris Field of Dreams"	June 25, 2019
As the weather begins to turn Kevin and his team begin their search for the boxcar at the bottom of Lake Michigan.
16	10	"It Ain't Over 'Til It's Overboard"	July 2, 2019
Marty Lagina joins the team as they face their final days of the season before the weather becomes too rough for diving.

== Sources ==
- 10 Things You Didn't Know about The Curse of Civil War Gold | TV Overmind
- What is The Curse of Civil War Gold? | BT
- What we learned from History's 'The Curse of Civil War Gold' | MLive
- 'The Curse Of Civil War Gold' Premiere Hits Paydirt For History | Deadline
- The Curse of Civil War Gold | Radio Times
