= Mount Dragon =

Novel by Douglas Preston and Lincoln Child

- Author: Douglas Preston, Lincoln Child
- Language: English
- Genre: Techno-thriller
- Publisher: Tor Books
- Publication date: 1996
- Publication place: United States
- Media type: Print (paperback)
- Pages: 349
- ISBN: 0-7653-5996-0
- OCLC: 317723824
- Followed by: Riptide

Mount Dragon is a 1996 techno-thriller novel by Douglas Preston and Lincoln Child, first published by Tor Books. The action primarily follows Guy Carson and Susana Cabeza de Vaca, two researchers employed by the corporation GeneDyne and stationed at the Mount Dragon facility in New Mexico. In attempting to engineer a therapeutic hormone to prevent all forms of influenza, GeneDyne has accidentally created a frighteningly virulent disease. Meanwhile, Carson and Cabeza de Vaca face a much more immediate threat at the Mount Dragon facility—from their own colleagues.

The novel was also released as an audiobook on 12 cassette tapes, read by David Colacci.

== Plot summary ==
Dr. Guy Carson is a young scientist and cowboy-at-heart, raised on a southwestern ranch and bored with city life. That is, until the prestigious genetic engineering corporation GeneDyne offers Carson a six-month position as a lab researcher at its Mount Dragon Remote Desert Testing Facility in Jornada del Muerto desert in New Mexico. Carson accepts and soon finds that the Mount Dragon laboratory is testing far more promising and dangerous things than Carson ever expected. Scientists at the facility spend months isolated from the outside world, essentially locked in the guarded facility within a Level 5 containment lab, as they research a vaccine for the influenza virus. With the help of his feisty lab assistant, Susanna Cabeza de Vaca, Carson begins to unlock the mysteries of the spontaneously mutating influenza virus, dubbed “X-FLU”.

Over time, Carson and DeVaca discover that their predecessor Dr. Franklin Burt, was literally driven mad by his time at Mount Dragon and was institutionalized. Burt’s death is not the only one caused by the facility; an emergency quarantine prompted by the contamination of the Level 5 lab by a chimp infected with the deadly X-FLU results in the death of researcher Rosalind Brandon-Smith. Soon, more human harm follows as Carson’s friend and messmate Dr. Andrew Vanderwagon spontaneously punctures his own eye with a fork and attempts to commit suicide and kill others. Through researching Burt’s descent to madness, Carson and DeVaca realize that what occurred with Vanderwagon closely resembled the behavior of Burt toward the end. In fact, everyone at the facility except for Carson and DeVaca begin to display abnormal and erratic behavior that Carson at first presumes is the result of tight quarters or contamination by X-FLU.

However, Carson has an epiphany after conducting further tests on influenza and discovers that what caused the virus to mutate is Burt’s filtering system — a system that was used to filter the artificial blood product PurBlood that GeneDyne is releasing in hospitals across the nation in mere days. Burt’s journal confirms that PurBlood is in fact contaminated; Burt’s filtering system caused the contamination by mutating the cells in the artificial blood.

Carson and DeVaca are the only workers at the Mount Dragon facility who did not undergo a PurBlood transfusion for beta testing, and thus are the only ones not driven to insanity by the contamination. They set off an explosion to destroy the facility and flee from its homicidal and suicidal inhabitants. Attempting to alert officials before PurBlood can be introduced across the nation, resulting in an epidemic, Carson and DeVaca set off on horseback across the arid New Mexico desert, hundreds of miles from the nearest civilization. They are chased by the security director, an eccentric Englishman named Nye whose PurBlood-induced madness has led him to believe that there is a treasure buried in the desert and that Carson and DeVaca are trying to steal it from him. After days of thirst and starvation, Carson and DeVaca find water—and the remains of the worthless “treasure” of Spanish explorer Mondragón—before engaging in a fight-to-the-death battle with Nye. Carson and DeVaca are injured, but survive, and make it to a nearby cattle ranch in time to spread the word about the dangers of PurBlood.

Aside from the action-ridden plot of Carson and DeVaca, the novel highlights political and scientific battle between the CEO of GeneDyne, Brent Scopes, and his former best friend, Charles Levine, over the ethics of genetic modification. Scopes argues that genetic modification, such as that involved in the creation of PurBlood, will one day lead to a healthier human race. Levine counters that the extent of the dangers of genetically modified products is unknown, and that humans should proceed with caution in genetically altering or engineering products that could change the biological make-up of humanity. In the end, Scopes and Levine are exposed to the mutated influenza virus X-FLU and resolve their differences before dying.

== Continuity ==
Mime, the "Thalidomide baby" hacker who assists Professor Levine, later appears in Preston and Child's Aloysius Pendergast series, offering similar assistance to Special Agent Pendergast. GeneDyne devices are also used in early Pendergast novels.
