= Frederick G. Nolan =

Canadian land surveyor and treasure hunter (1927–2016)

- Born: July 5, 1927; Halifax, Nova Scotia, Canada
- Died: June 4, 2016 (aged 88); Halifax, Nova Scotia, Canada
- Occupations: Land surveyor, Oak Island historian
- Spouse: Ora Miller
- Children: Thomas J.

Frederick G. Nolan (July 5, 1927 – June 4, 2016) was a Canadian land surveyor as well as a known Oak Island treasure hunter. Over five decades, he surveyed the island and recorded unexplained markings and artifacts, including the boulder formation that became known as Nolan's Cross. He appeared on the History Channel's TV series about the island, The Curse of Oak Island, including the episode "The Missing Peace".

== Career as land surveyor ==
Nolan was one of the first land surveyors in the province of Nova Scotia to receive designation as a Provincial Land Surveyor. With his brother Richard, he opened a surveying company called Nolan Brothers Surveys. Some of their notable works include the layout of the entire Westmount Subdivision at the site of the old Halifax airport, on Chebucto Road. Another was the site of the first Sobeys store in Halifax Regional Municipality.

== Oak Island ==
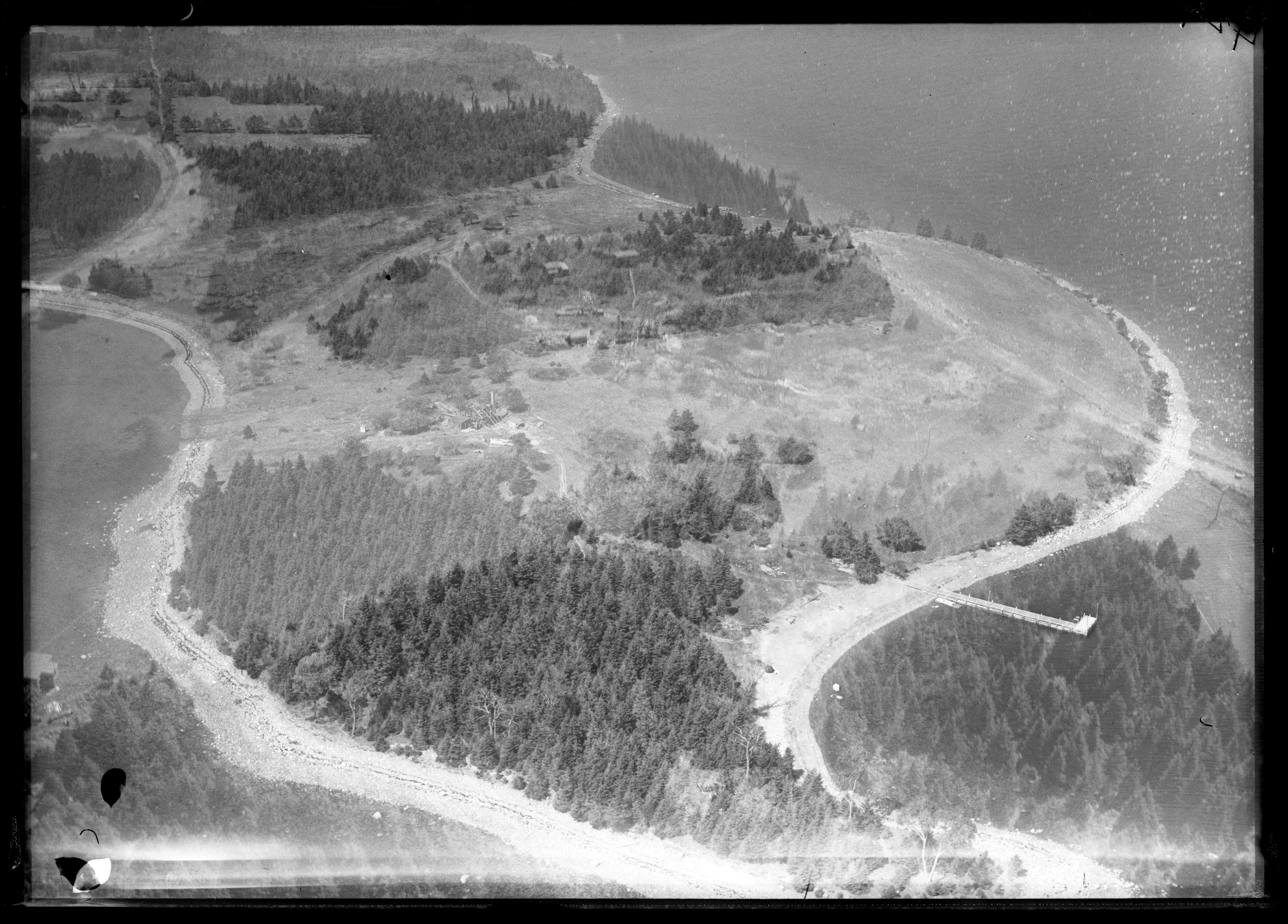
Oak Island from the air in 1931

Nolan became interested in the history of Oak Island and its supposed treasure, studying documents and maps from maritime libraries and museums in Spain that related to lost ships carrying treasure back from the Americas. During this exploration of over fifty years, he uncovered numerous unexplained markings and artifacts from Oak Island's terrain. Nolan also found a formation of boulders in the shape of a cross on his property on the island, which became known as Nolan's Cross. He maintained his interest in this quest until his death, in 2016, and in his later years, he was a consultant to the producers of The Curse of Oak Island.
