= Riptide (novel) =

1998 novel by Douglas Preston and Lincoln Child

- Riptide (1998 cover)
- Author: Douglas Preston, Lincoln Child
- Language: English
- Genre: Thriller, Science fiction novel
- Published: 1998 (Warner Books)
- Publication place: United States
- Media type: Hardcover
- Pages: 496
- ISBN: 0-446-60717-7
- OCLC: 41576664
- Preceded by: Mount Dragon
- Followed by: Thunderhead

Riptide is a novel by Douglas Preston and Lincoln Child, published in 1998 by Warner Books.

The novel revolves around a plot to retrieve the buried treasure of nefarious pirate Red Ned Ockham. The treasure, which is estimated to be worth close to two billion dollars, reputedly includes "St. Michael's Sword", a weapon with the power to kill anyone who looks at it.

The novel is pure fiction but is based in part on the legend of the Oak Island Money Pit.

The location of the pit, described as the Water Pit in Riptide, is moved to a fictional Ragged Island, a dangerous drumlin island approximately six miles off the coast of Maine.

Riptide is prominent among Preston and Child's works as being the one and only novel by both authors that is a complete stand-alone story, separate from their other works. No characters seen or mentioned in Riptide have any role in any of their other novels, unlike their other stand-alone works such as Mount Dragon, Thunderhead, and The Ice Limit.

== Plot/Summary ==
The novel begins in 1971 and introduces main character Malin Hatch and his older brother Johnny Hatch. In search of something to do with their summer day, Malin suggests that the two explore Ragged Island, an island owned by the Hatch family. Ragged Island is strictly off limits to the boys, because of its ability to "destroy" those who come in contact with it. The Hatch brothers ignore their father's demand to stay away from the island and set off for it. Once the boys make it to the island, a terrible accident takes place, that Malin will struggle with for the next 25 years.

Twenty five years later, Dr. Malin Hatch is approached by Gerard Neidelman, a self-proclaimed recovery specialist (a euphemism for treasure hunter), who claims to know who designed the pit, and, therefore, holds the key to unearthing the treasure. Hatch is at first skeptical of Neidelman's claim, but at length allows him to dig on the island.

Once on the island, things do not go as planned. Mysterious accidents, illnesses and computer problems plague the salvage team, and it is discovered that the architect of the "Water Pit" is more clever than anyone realized.

It also is revealed that the artifact, St. Michael's Sword, is in fact radioactive. This accounts for both the mysterious deaths of Red Ned's crew and for the computer glitches the team is having. The man who designed the water pit had realized that the artifact is actually deadly as well, so he built the pit to collapse on anyone entering it. However, the team learns too late that the entire island is sitting over a massive natural void in the ground, and that anyone removing the sword will collapse it. When Neidelman attempts to regain the sword, ignoring the warnings of the rest of the treasure-hunting team, he fatally irradiates both himself and another character before the island collapses beneath the sea and the sword is lost forever. Neidelman is also lost in the collapse.

== Reception ==
Critical reception has been positive. Publishers Weekly wrote a mostly favorable review for Riptide, criticizing it for its "diffusion of villains" while also stating that "Machine-gun pacing, startling plot twists and smart use of legend, scientific lore (including cryptanalysis) and the evocative setting carry the day, however, resulting in an exciting boys' adventure tale for adults that's bound to be one of most popular of the summer reads." IGN had a similar opinion, stating that it "was predictable to me in a few spots, but it didn't take away from my enjoyment of it. After all, you know Indiana Jones is going to get the girl, win the prize, and he's not going to die, but it's still fun to get from point A to point B. That's the case here."

== Film ==
According to an interview in 2003 with Douglas Preston, talk of a film based upon the book was in its beginning stages. As of 2008, the film has still not started production. No further comment on the film has been announced since 2003.
