= Oak Island mystery =

Stories of buried treasure on Oak Island, Nova Scotia, Canada

Coordinates: 44.51365°N 64.29466°W

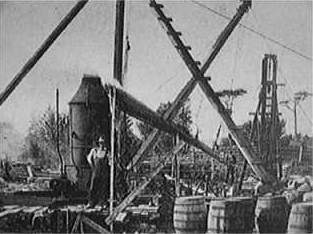
Excavation work on Oak Island during the 19th century

The Oak Island mystery refers to stories and legends about buried treasure and unexplained objects found on or near Oak Island in Nova Scotia, Canada. The site consists of digs by numerous individuals and groups of people. The original shaft, the location of which is unknown today, was dug by early explorers, and is known as "the money pit".

Since the 18th century, attempts have been made to find treasure and artifacts. Hypotheses about the treasure range from pirate gold to Shakespearean manuscripts to the Holy Grail and the Ark of the Covenant, with the Grail and the Ark having been buried there by the Knights Templar. Various items such as wood from a shaft have been found on the island over the years, some even dating to hundreds of years old. The alleged treasure has never been found.

A curse on the treasure is said to have originated more than a century ago and states that seven men will die in the search for the treasure before it is found.

== History ==
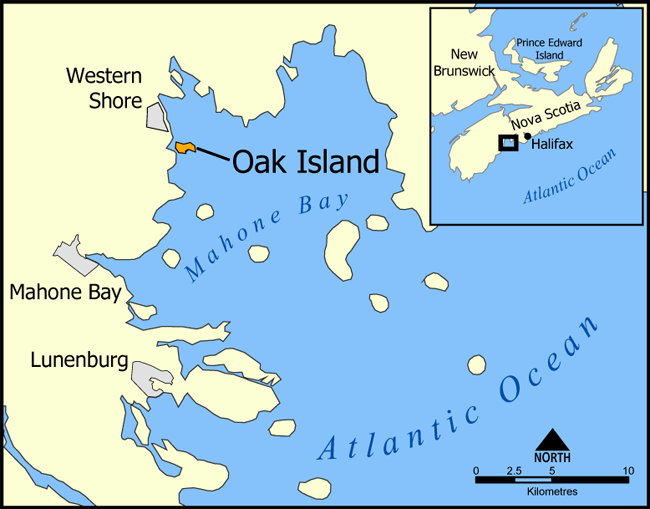
Location of Oak Island in Nova Scotia

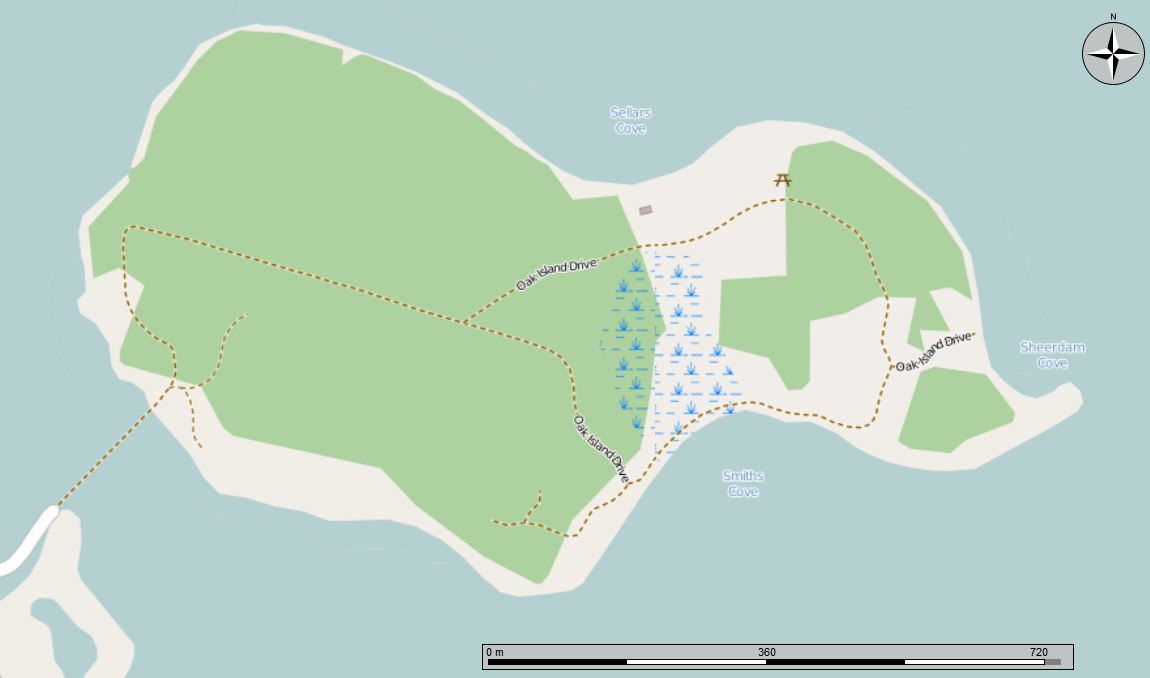
Map of Oak Island

=== Early accounts (1790s–1857) ===
Very little verified information is known about early treasure-related activities on Oak Island; thus, the following accounts are word of mouth stories reportedly going back to the late eighteenth century. Decades later publishers began to pay attention to such activity and investigated the stories involved. The earliest known story of a treasure found by a settler named Daniel McGinnis appeared in print in 1857. It then took another five years before one of the alleged original diggers gave a statement regarding the original story along with subsequent Onslow and Truro Company activities.

The original story by early settlers (first recorded in print in 1863) involves a dying sailor from the crew of Captain Kidd (d. 1701), in which he states that treasure worth £2 million had been buried on the island. According to the most widely held discovery story, Daniel McGinnis found a depression in the ground in the summer of 1795, while he was looking for a location for a farm. McGinnis, who believed that the depression was consistent with the Captain Kidd story, sought help with digging. With the assistance of two men identified only as John Smith and Anthony Vaughn, he excavated the depression and discovered a layer of flagstones two feet (61 cm) below. According to later accounts, oak platforms were discovered every 10 feet (3.0 m); however, the earliest accounts simply mention "marks" of some type at these intervals. The accounts also mentioned "tool marks" or pick scrapes on the walls of the pit. The earth was noticeably loose, not as hard-packed as the surrounding soil. The three men reportedly abandoned the excavation at 30 feet (9.1 m) due to "superstitious dread". Another twist on the story has all four people involved as teenagers. In this rendering, McGinnis first finds the depression in 1795 while on a fishing expedition. The rest of the story is consistent with the first involving the logs found, but ends with all four individuals giving up after digging as much as they could.

In about 1802, a group known as the Onslow Company allegedly sailed from central Nova Scotia to Oak Island to recover what they believed to be hidden treasure. (Note: No original documents relating to the Onslow Company have ever been found. It is known that the company operated sometime roughly in the early 1800s.) They continued the excavation down to about 90 feet (27 m), with layers of logs (or "marks") found about every ten feet (3.0 m), and also discovered layers of charcoal, putty and coconut fibre along with a large stone inscribed with symbols. The diggers then faced a dilemma when the pit flooded with 60 feet (18 m) of water for unknown reasons. The alleged excavation was eventually abandoned after workers attempted to recover the treasure from below by digging a tunnel from a second shaft that also flooded.

The last major company of the unpublished era was called The Truro Company, which was allegedly formed in 1849 by investors. The pit was re-excavated back down to the 86-foot (26 m) level, but ended up flooding again. It was then decided to drill five bore holes using a pod-auger into the original shaft. The auger passed through a spruce platform at 98 feet (30 m), then hit layers of oak, something described as "metal in pieces", another spruce layer, and clay for 7 feet (2.1 m). This platform was hit twice; each time metal was brought to the surface, along with various other items such as wood and coconut fibre.

Another shaft was then dug 109 feet (33 m) deep northwest of the original shaft, and a tunnel was again branched off in an attempt to intersect the treasure. Once again though, seawater flooded this new shaft; workers then assumed that the water was connected to the sea because the now-flooded new pit rose and fell with each tide cycle. The Truro Company shifted its resources to excavating a nearby cove known as "Smith's Cove" where they found a flood tunnel system. When efforts failed to shut off the flood system, one final shaft was dug 118 feet (36 m) deep with the branched-off tunnel going under the original shaft. Sometime during the excavation of this new shaft, the bottom of the original shaft collapsed. It was later speculated that the treasure had fallen through the new shaft into a deep void causing the new shaft to flood as well. The Truro Company then ran out of funds and was dissolved sometime in 1851. (Note: One of the "best" accounts of what happened with the Truro Company later appeared in the "1893 Oak Island Treasure Company Investment Prospectus".)

The first published account took place in 1857, when the Liverpool Transcript mentioned a group digging for Captain Kidd's treasure on Oak Island. This would be followed by a more complete account by a justice of the peace in Chester, Nova Scotia, in 1861, which was also published in The Transcript under the title of "The Oak Island Folly" regarding the contemporary scepticism of there being any treasure. However, the first published account of what had taken place on the Island did not appear until October 16, 1862, when Anthony Vaughan's memories were recorded by The Transcript for posterity. Activities regarding the Onslow and Truro Companies were also included that mention the mysterious stone and the Truro owned auger hitting wooden platforms along with the "metal in pieces". The accounts based on the Liverpool Transcript articles also ran in the Novascotian, the British Colonist, and is mentioned in an 1895 book called A History Of Lunenburg County.

=== Early excavations (1861–1898) ===
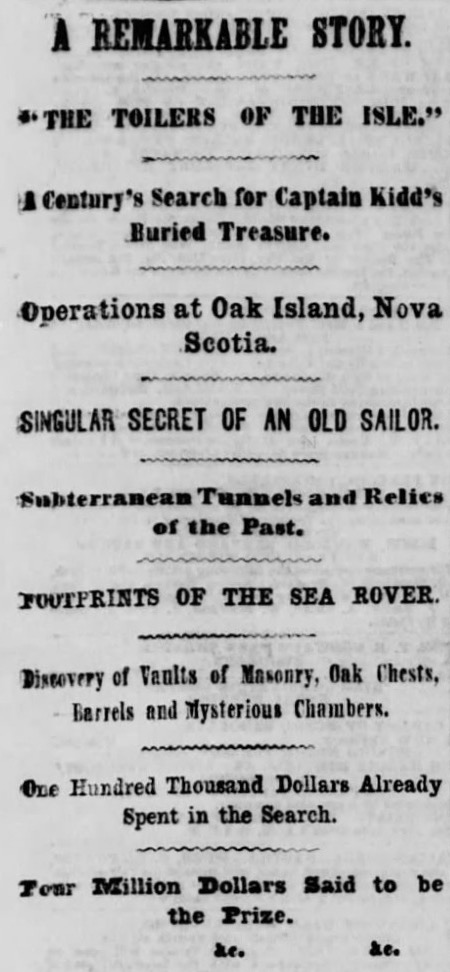
Headline of an 1866 article about Oak Island appearing in the New York Herald

The next major excavation attempt was carried out in 1861 by a company called "The Oak Island Association". The original pit was re-excavated to a depth of 88 feet (27 m), and two more shafts were dug. The first one missed its intended target of an alleged flood tunnel, while the other intersected the original shaft via a branched-off tunnel at around 105 feet (32 m) deep. Both of these shafts were filled with water when an alleged flood tunnel was again breached. At one point, one of the platforms placed in the original shaft at 98 feet (30 m) collapsed and dropped to a lower level. The effect caused the next two platforms to drop as well, with any treasure now resting 119 feet (36 m) below ground along with an estimated 10,000 board feet (24 m^{3}) of lumber. The first of six accidental deaths during excavations occurred in late 1861 when a pump engine boiler burst. The explosion was first mentioned in an 1863 novel titled Rambles Among the Blue-noses, while mention of a death came five years later. Another shaft was dug in early 1862, one which was 107 feet (33 m) deep. This new shaft was parallel to and connected with the original shaft. It was used to pump water out of the original shaft to a depth of 103 feet (31 m). Although the pumps could not keep up with the floodwater, tools that had been used by the Onslow and Truro companies were recovered. The Oak Island Association also did some work at Smith's Cove by drilling a few shafts in an attempt to shut off and seal the alleged flood tunnels. All of these attempts were failures in the end, due to the tide which eventually broke through barriers that were put in place. One final attempt was made in 1864 to intersect the money pit, resulting in alleged flood tunnels again being breached. By this time, saltwater was undermining the walls of the original shaft, which some workers refused to enter. The original shaft was inspected by mining engineers who declared it unsafe, and the company abandoned their efforts when their money ran out.

In 1866, a group known as The Oak Island Eldorado Company or more commonly The Halifax Company was formed to find the treasure. By this time, there were many shafts, bore holes, and tunnels under Oak Island made by previous treasure hunters. When a plan to shut off the alleged flood tunnels from Smith's Cove did not work, the company decided to shift focus to the original main shaft. Exploratory holes that were drilled turned up bits of wood, more coconut fiber, soft clay, and blue mud. Having found nothing of interest, the group gave up the search in 1867.

In 1896, an unknown group arrived on the island with steam pumps and boring equipment. Although the pumps were unable to keep water out of the flooded side shaft, boring samples were taken. It was claimed that one of the samples brought a tiny piece of sheepskin parchment to the surface. The parchment had two letters, "vi" or "wi", written in India ink. The second accidental death occurred on March 26, 1897, when a worker named Maynard Kaiser fell to his death. In 1898, red paint was poured into the flooded pit by the group, reportedly revealing three exit holes around the island.

=== The Old Gold Salvage group (1909) ===
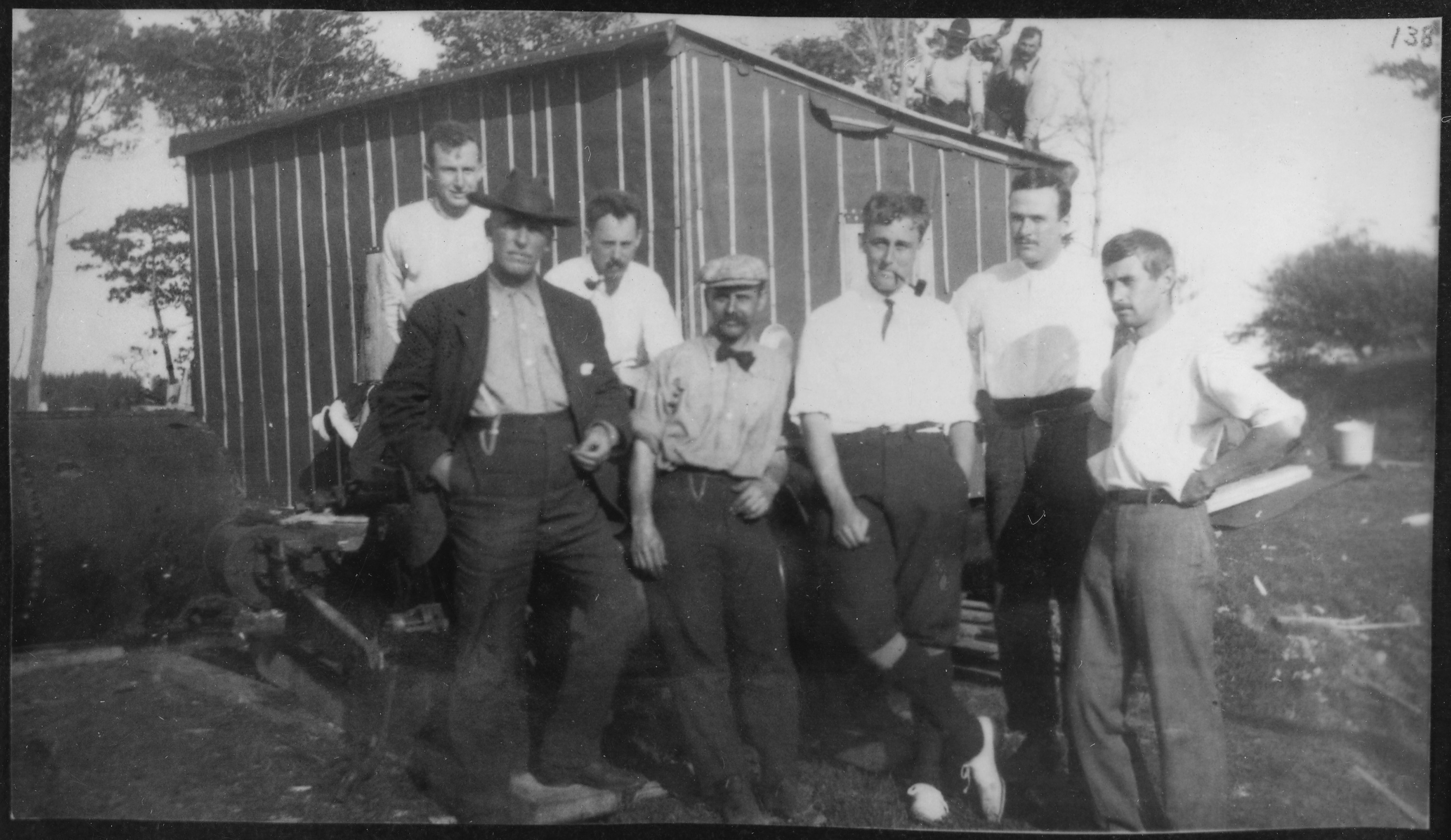
1909 exploration group; Franklin D. Roosevelt is third from right, with pipe

Captain Henry L. Bowdoin arrived on Oak Island in August 1909 representing the Old Gold Salvage group, one of whose members was Franklin D. Roosevelt. By this time, the area now known as the "money pit" was cleared out to 113 feet (34 m) and divers were sent down to investigate. Although multiple borings were taken in and around the pit, none of the cores revealed anything of interest.

Bowdoin also examined Smith's Cove, where drain tunnels and a ring bolt in a rock had reportedly been seen. Although the group found the remains of an 1850 cofferdam, no evidence of anything else was found. Bowdoin later examined the "stone cipher" in Halifax and found it a basalt rock with no symbols. He was doubtful that symbols could have worn off the rock, given its hardness. The group left the island in November 1909.

=== William Chappell and Gilbert Hedden (1928–1939) ===
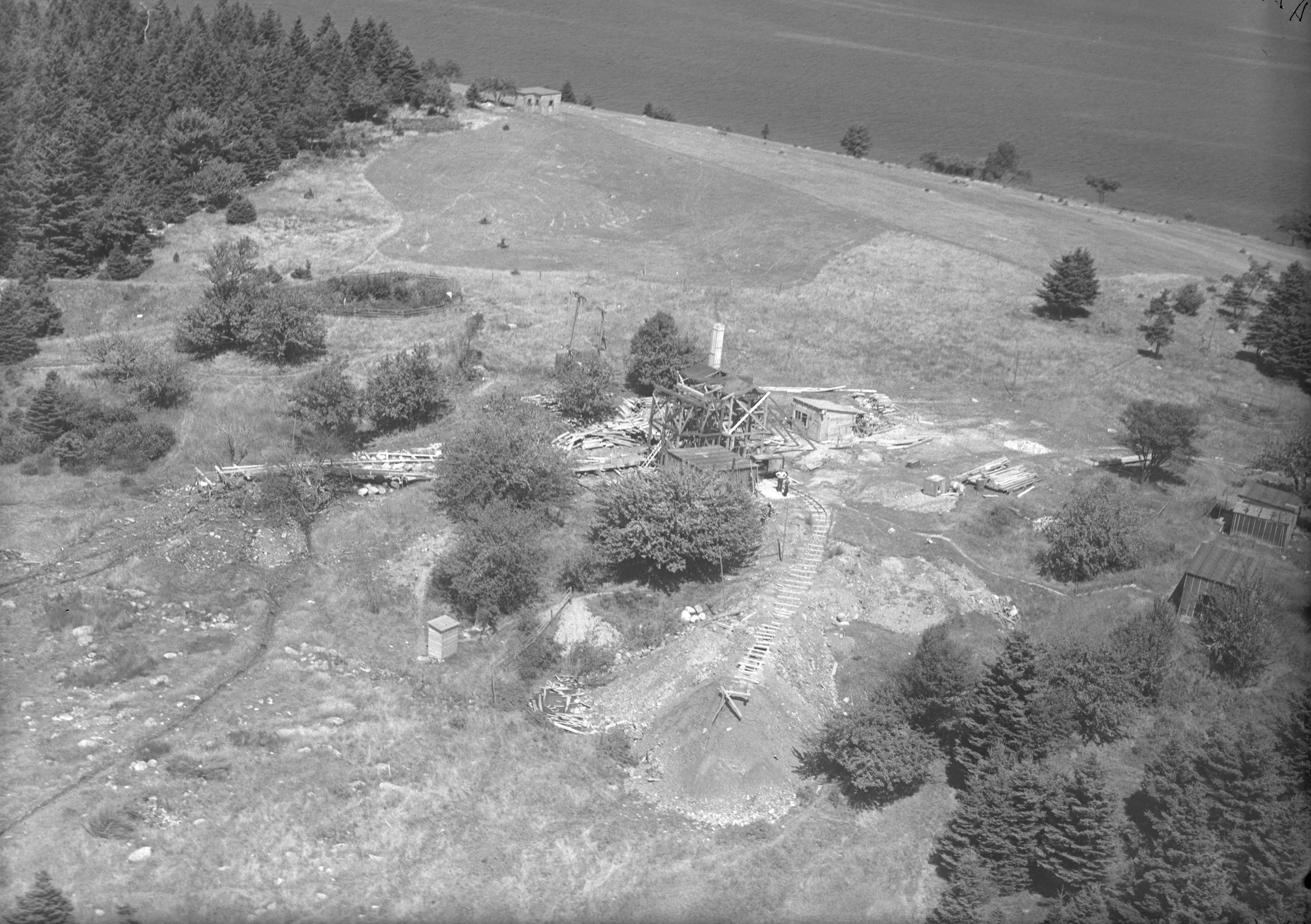
August 1931 aerial photo of digs and buildings

In 1928, a New York newspaper published a feature story about Oak Island. William Chappell became interested and excavated the pit in 1931 by sinking a 12-by-14-foot (3.7 m × 4.3 m) 163-foot (50 m) shaft southwest of what he believed was the site of the 1897 shaft (which was thought, without evidence, to be near the original pit). At 127 feet (39 m), artifacts, including an axe, a fluke anchor and a pick, were found. The pick was identified as a Cornish miner's pick, but by this time the area around the pit was littered with debris from previous excavation attempts and finding the owner was impossible.

Gilbert Hedden, an operator of a steel fabricating company, saw the 1928 article and was fascinated by the engineering problems involved in recovering the reported treasure. Hedden made six trips to Oak Island and collected books and articles about the island. He went to England to consult Harold T. Wilkins, author of Captain Kidd and His Skeleton Island, about a link he found between Oak Island and a map in Wilkins' book. After Chappell's excavations, Hedden began digging in mid-1935, after he purchased the southeastern end of the island. Further excavations were made in 1935 and 1936, none of which were successful. In 1939, he informed King George VI about developments on the island.

Another pit, similar to the early description of the "money pit", was discovered in the area in 1949 when workmen were digging a well on the shore of Mahone Bay. At a point where the earth was soft, "At about two feet down a layer of fieldstone was struck. Then logs of spruce and oak were unearthed at irregular intervals, and some of the wood was charred. The immediate suspicion was that another money pit had been found."

=== Restall family and Robert Dunfield (1959–1966) ===
Robert Restall, his 18-year-old son, and work partner Karle Graeser, came to Oak Island in 1959 after signing a contract with one of the property owners. In 1965, they tried to seal what was thought to be a storm drain in Smith's Cove and dug a shaft down to 27 feet (8.2 m). An account of an excavation of the pit was published in the January 1965 issue of Reader's Digest. On August 17, Restall was overcome by hydrogen sulfide fumes. His son then went down the shaft, and also lost consciousness. Graeser and two others, Cyril Hiltz and Andy DeMont, then attempted to save the two men. A visitor to the site, Edward White, had himself lowered on a rope into the shaft but was able to bring out only DeMont. Restall, his son, Graeser and Hiltz all died.

That year, Robert Dunfield leased portions of the island. Dunfield dug the pit area to a depth of 134 feet (41 m) and a width of 100 feet (30 m) by using a 70-ton digging crane with a clam bucket. Transportation of the crane to the island required the construction of a causeway (which still exists) from the western end of the island to Crandall's Point on the mainland, two hundred metres away. Dunfield's lease ended in August 1966.

=== Triton Alliance (1967–1990s) ===
In January 1967, Daniel C. Blankenship, David Tobias, Robert Dunfield, and Fred Nolan formed a syndicate for exploration on Oak Island. Two years later, Blankenship and Tobias formed Triton Alliance after purchasing most of the island. Several former landowners, including Mel Chappell, became shareholders in Triton. Triton workers excavated a 235 feet (72 m) shaft, known as Borehole 10-X and supported by a steel caisson to bedrock, in 1971.

According to Blankenship and Tobias, cameras lowered down the shaft into a cave recorded possible chests, human remains, wooden cribbing and tools; however, the images were unclear and none of the claims have been independently confirmed. The shaft later collapsed, and the excavation was again abandoned. The shaft was later re-dug to 181 feet (55 m), reaching bedrock, but work was halted due to lack of funds and the collapse of the partnership. Divers sent to the bottom of Borehole 10-X in 2016 found no artifacts.

The island was the subject of an episode of In Search of... which was first broadcast on January 18, 1979.

In 1983, Triton Alliance sued Frederick Nolan over the ownership of seven lots on the island and its causeway access. Two years later, Nolan's ownership of the lots was confirmed, but he was ordered to pay damages for interfering with Triton's tourist business. On appeal, Triton lost again in 1989 and Nolan's damages were reduced.

During the 1990s, further exploration stalled because of legal battles between the Triton partners and a lack of financing. In 2005, a portion of the island was for sale for US$7 million. Although the Oak Island Tourism Society had hoped that the Government of Canada would purchase the island, a group of American drillers did so instead.

=== Robert S. Young (1996–2020) ===
In June 1996, Robert S. Young of Upper Tantallon, Nova Scotia, purchased 4 acres (1.6 ha) of the island known as Lot Five from Fred Nolan. This property is the only untouched land left on Oak Island. Young died on October 28, 2020, and the land passed to his estate. His finds, including a silver 1781 Spanish half-real, are documented on his website.

=== Oak Island Tours and The Michigan Group (2005–present) ===
It was announced in April 2006 that brothers Rick and Marty Lagina of Michigan had purchased 50 percent of Oak Island Tours from David Tobias for an undisclosed sum. The rest of the company is owned by Blankenship. Center Road Developments, in conjunction with Allan Kostrzewa and Brian Urbach (members of the Michigan group), had purchased Lot 25 from David Tobias for a reported $230,000 one year before Tobias sold the rest of his share. The Michigan group, working with Blankenship, said that it would resume operations on Oak Island in the hope of discovering buried treasure and solving the island's mystery.

In July 2010, Blankenship and the other stakeholders in Oak Island Tours announced on their website that the Nova Scotia Department of Natural Resources and Department of Tourism, Culture and Heritage had granted them a treasure-trove license which allowed them to resume activities until December 31, 2010. After December 2010, the departments repealed the treasure-trove license and replaced it with an Oak Island Treasure Act. The act, which became effective on January 1, 2011, allows treasure hunting to continue on the island under the terms of a licence issued by the Minister of Natural Resources. Exploration by the Lagina brothers has been documented in the reality television show The Curse of Oak Island, airing on History since 2014.

== Water in the money pit ==
According to an account written in 1862, after the Onslow Company had excavated to 80–90 feet (24–27 metres), the pit flooded with seawater up to the 33-foot (10 m) level; attempts to remove the water were unsuccessful. Explorers have made claims about an elaborate drainage system extending from the ocean beaches to the pit.

Later treasure hunters claimed that coconut fibres were discovered beneath the surface of a beach, Smith's Cove, in 1851. This led to the hypothesis that the beach had been converted into a siphon, feeding seawater into the pit through a man-made tunnel. A sample of this material was reportedly sent to the Smithsonian Institution during the early 20th century, where it was concluded that the material was coconut fibre.

Although one expedition claimed to have found a flood tunnel lined with flat stones at 90 feet (27 m), geologist Robert Dunfield wrote that he carefully examined the walls of the re-excavated pit and was unable to locate any evidence of a tunnel.

At the invitation of Boston-area businessman David Mugar, a two-week survey was conducted by the Woods Hole Oceanographic Institution in 1995 (the only known scientific study conducted on the site). After running dye tests in the bore hole, the institution concluded that the flooding was caused by a natural interaction between the island's freshwater lens and tidal pressures in the underlying geology (refuting the man-made tunnel hypothesis). The Woods Hole scientists who viewed the 1971 videos reported that nothing conclusive could be determined from the murky images. The reported five finger (or box) drains at Smith's Cove have recently been thought to be the remains of an early salt works, with no connection between the drains and any flooding of the pit.

Oak Island lies on a glacial tumulus system and is underlain by a series of water-filled anhydrite cavities which may be responsible for the repeated flooding of the pit. This type of limestone easily dissolves when exposed to water, forming caves and natural voids. Bedrock lies at a depth of 38 to 45 metres (125 to 148 feet) in the pit area.

== Stone with alleged markings ==
A stone found 90 feet below the surface was said to have been inscribed with "mysterious markings". It was first reported in a July 2, 1862, Halifax Sun and Advisor article, which mentioned a June 2, 1862, letter by J. B. McCully which retold the story of the stone. Offering a secondhand description of its discovery during the early 1800s excavation, McCully wrote: "Some [layers] were charcoal, some putty, and one at 80 feet was a stone cut square, two feet long and about a foot thick, with several characters cut on it." In an 1863 newspaper article, the stone was said to have been built into the "chimney of an old house near the pit". Another article, a year later, claimed that the stone was held by the Smith family. On January 2, 1864, Historical Society of Nova Scotia secretary John Hunter-Duvar contacted treasure hunter George Cooke. In a January 27 letter to Hunter-Duvar, Cooke claimed that Smith built the stone into his chimney in 1824 and said that he was shown the stone by Smith in the chimney around 1850, when "there were some crudely cut letters, figures or characters upon it. I cannot recollect which, but they appear as if they had been scraped out by a blunt instrument, rather than cut with a sharp one". According to Cooke, when he made inquiries in 1864, he discovered that the chimney had been enclosed in wood and surrounded by a staircase; the stone was no longer visible. An undated post-1893 letter by William Blair read, "Jefferson W. McDonald, who first mentioned Oak Island to me in 1893, worked under George Mitchell. Mr. McDonald, who was a carpenter by trade, also told of taking down a partition in Smith's house, in order that he with others might examine the characters cut on the stone used in the fireplace in the house. The characters were there all right, but no person present could decipher them." Mitchell was the superintendent of works for the Oak Island Association, which was formed on April 3, 1861, and ceased operation by March 29, 1865.

In his 1872 novel, The Treasure of the Seas, James DeMille describes being a summer resident of Chester Basin during the later 1860s. The characters in the novel find that the stone had been removed from the chimney when they arrived on the island; until then, no one had been able to decode the mysterious symbols reportedly on the stone, which an inn landlord describes as 'rather faint, and irregular' – he also says that 'men who don't believe in Kidd's treasure ... say that it isn't an inscription at all ... it's only some accidental scratches'. Reginald Vanderbilt Harris (1881–1968) wrote in his 1958 book, The Oak Island Mystery, "About 1865–1866 the stone was removed and taken to Halifax. Among those who worked to remove the stone was Jefferson W. MacDonald." The Blair letter mentioned above states that MacDonald took down the partition in order to examine the stone, not to remove it. Harris provides no source for the claim that the stone was removed in 1865 or 1866. The next mention of the stone is in an 1893 Oak Island Treasure Company prospectus. According to the prospectus, the stone was taken out of the chimney and moved to Halifax; there, James Liechti was said to have deciphered the stone as reading: "Ten feet below are two million pounds buried".

On August 19, 1911, Collier's magazine published a firsthand account by Captain H. L. Bowdoin of the stone (which was then in use at Creighton's bookbindery in Halifax). Bowdoin described the rock as "of a basalt type hard and fine-grained". The stone he saw had no symbols on it. Although Bowdoin was told that they had worn off, he was skeptical because of the stone's hardness. According to Charles B. Driscoll's 1929 book, The Oak Island Treasure (based on secondhand accounts),

The stone was shown to everyone who visited the Island in those days. Smith built this stone into his fireplace, with the strange characters outermost, so that visitors might see and admire it. Many years after his death, the stone was removed from the fireplace and taken to Halifax, where the local savants were unable to translate the inscription. It was then taken to the home of J.B. McCulley in Truro, where it was exhibited to hundreds of friends of the McCulleys who became interested in a later treasure company. Somehow the stone fell into the hands of a bookbinder, which used it as a base upon which to beat leather for many years. A generation later, with the inscription nearly worn away, the stone found its way to a bookstore in Halifax, and what happened to it after that I was unable to learn. But there are plenty of people living who have seen the stone. Nobody, however, ever seriously pretended to translate the inscription.

The stone was reportedly brought by A. O. Creighton (of the 1866 expedition) from the Smith home to Creighton's bookbindery in Halifax. Harry W. Marshall (born 1879), the son of an owner of the bookbindery, wrote in 1935 that:

1. He well remembered seeing the stone as a boy.
2. "While in Creighton's possession some lad had cut his initials 'J.M.' on one corner, but apart from this there was no evidence of any inscription either cut or painted on the stone."
3. Creighton used the stone for a beating stone and weight.
4. When the business was closed in 1919, the stone was left behind.

One researcher claimed that the cipher translated as "Forty feet below, two million pounds lie buried". The symbols associated with the "Forty feet below" translation first appeared in 1949's True Tales of Buried Treasure by explorer and historian Edward Rowe Snow. In his book, Snow said that he received the set of symbols from Rev. A. T. Kempton of Cambridge, Massachusetts, but no information was provided as to how or where Kempton obtained them. It was found that Kempton had stated in a letter dated April 1949 that he had obtained his information from "a school teacher long since dead".

== Investors and explorers ==
Franklin D. Roosevelt, stirred by family stories originating from his sailing and trading grandfather (and Oak Island financier) Warren Delano Jr., began following the mystery in late 1909 and early 1910. Roosevelt continued to follow it until his death in 1945. Throughout his political career, he monitored the island's recovery attempts and development. Although the president secretly planned to visit Oak Island in 1939 while he was in Halifax, fog and the international situation prevented him from doing so.

Australian-American actor Errol Flynn invested in an Oak Island treasure dig. Actor John Wayne also invested in the drilling equipment used on the island and offered his equipment to be used to help solve the mystery. William Vincent Astor, heir to the Astor family fortune after his father died on the Titanic, was a passive investor in digging for treasure on the island.

Rear Admiral Richard E. Byrd Jr. was also a passive investor in Oak Island exploration and treasure hunting, and monitored their status. Byrd advised Franklin D. Roosevelt about the island; the men forged a relationship, forming the United States Antarctic Service (USAS, a federal-government program) with Byrd nominally in command.

== Potential explanations ==
Many hypotheses have been proposed to putatively link various natural phenomena, historical persons, or relics and artifacts with Oak Island; none of these are proven.

=== Natural sinkholes ===
Wide-ranging speculation exists about how the pit was formed and what it might contain. According to Joe Nickell, there is no treasure; the pit is a natural phenomenon, probably a sinkhole connected to limestone passages or caverns. Suggestions that the pit is a natural phenomenon (accumulated debris in a sinkhole or geological fault) date to at least 1911. Sinkholes and caves, to which the "booby traps" are attributed, exist on the mainland near the island.

Its resemblance to a human-made pit has been suggested as partly due to the texture of natural, accumulated debris in sinkholes: "This filling would be softer than the surrounding ground, and give the impression that it had been dug up before". The "platforms" of rotten logs have been attributed to trees, damaged by "blowdowns" (derechos) or wildfires, periodically falling (or washing into) the hollow.

=== Industrial works ===
Author Joy Steele suggests that the money pit was a tar kiln dating to the historical period when "Oak Island served as a tar-making location as part of the British naval stores industry". Or, as noted above (§ Water in the money pit), perhaps the site may have held illicit historical salt works.

=== Treasure trove ===
According to the earliest hypothesis, the pit held a pirate treasure buried by Captain Kidd; Kidd and Henry Avery reportedly took treasure together, and Oak Island was their community bank. Another pirate story involved Edward Teach (Blackbeard), who said that he buried his treasure "where none but Satan and myself can find it."

Templars, Masons, or Incas seeking to squirrel their treasure away from European persecutors or Spanish conquistadors may have created the money pit, according to William S. Crooker. Crooker stated though that it was more likely British engineers and sailors dug the pit to store loot acquired in the British invasion of Cuba, during the Seven Years' War, valued at about £1,000,000. Others hypothesize that British forces may have used the Island to store money for the colonial wars that engulfed Nova Scotia from 1710 to 1783. Such possibilities being less-old may be supported by the presence of wooden relics found on scene in the 1800s, which might not have lasted a hundred years.

John Godwin wrote that given the apparent size and complexity of the pit, it was probably dug by French Army engineers hiding the treasury of the Fortress of Louisbourg after British forces captured the fortress during the Seven Years' War.

=== Masonic and religious artifacts ===
In his book, Oak Island Secrets, Mark Finnan noted that many Masonic markings were found on Oak Island, and the shaft (or pit) and its mysterious contents seemed to replicate aspects of a Masonic initiation rite involving a hidden vault with a sacred treasure. Joe Nickell identifies parallels between Oak Island accounts, the "Secret Vault" allegory in York Rite Freemasonry and the Chase Vault on Barbados. Freemason Dennis King examines the Masonic aspects of the Oak Island legend in his article, "The Oak Island Legend: The Masonic Angle". Steven Sora speculated that the pit could have been dug by exiled Knights Templar and might be the final resting place of the Holy Grail or the Ark of the Covenant.

=== Bacon-Shakespeare authorship ===
In his 1953 book The Oak Island Enigma: A History and Inquiry into the Origin of the Money Pit, Penn Leary wrote that the pit was used to hide manuscripts indicating that Francis Bacon was the author of William Shakespeare's works and a leader of the Rosicrucians. Leary's The Second Cryptographic Shakespeare, published in 1990, identified ciphers in Shakespeare's plays and poems which pointed to Bacon's authorship. Author and researcher Mark Finnan elaborated on Leary's Oak Island hypothesis, which was also used in the Norwegian book Organisten (The Seven Steps to Mercy) by Erlend Loe and Petter Amundsen and the TV series Sweet Swan of Avon.

Another hypothesis holds that the Rosicrucians and their reported leader, Francis Bacon, organized a secret project to make Oak Island the home of its legendary vault with ingenious means to conceal ancient manuscripts and artifacts. Researchers and cryptographers such as Petter Amundsen and Daniel Ronnstam claim to have found codes hidden in Shakespeare, rock formations on the island, and clues hidden in other 16th- and 17th-century art and historical documents. According to Daniel Ronnstam, the stone found at 90 feet (27 m) contains a dual cipher created by Bacon.

=== Marie Antoinette's jewels ===
Unproven stories allege that Marie Antoinette's jewels, missing except for specimens in museum collections, may have been hidden on the island. On October 5, 1789, revolutionaries incited an angry mob of Parisian working women to march on the Palace of Versailles. According to an undocumented story, Marie Antoinette instructed her maid (or a lady-in-waiting) to flee with her jewels. The maid fled to London with the jewels, and perhaps artwork, documents and other treasures, secreted on her person or in her luggage. The person then fled from London to Nova Scotia.

=== Coptic runes ===
Marine biologist and pseudoarchaeologist Barry Fell had the symbols on the stone translated during the late 1970s. The symbols resembled the Coptic alphabet and read: "To escape contagion of plague and winter hardships, he is to pray for an end or mitigation the Arif: The people will perish in misery if they forget the Lord, alas". Fell hypothesized that Coptic travellers sailed from North Africa to Oak Island and constructed the pit. This theory, however, is not considered credible by many mainstream academics.
