= Pat Croce =

American businessman (born 1954)

- Born: Pasquale Croce; November 2, 1954 (age 71); Philadelphia, Pennsylvania, U.S.
- Education: West Chester University and University of Pittsburgh
- Occupations: Entrepreneur, sports team executive and owner, author, TV personality

Pasquale "Pat" Croce (born November 2, 1954) is an American entrepreneur, sports team executive and owner, author, and TV personality. He served as team president of the National Basketball Association (NBA)'s Philadelphia 76ers from 1996 to 2001.

== Early life and education ==
Croce is the son of an Italian American father and Irish American mother. He attended West Chester University and graduated from the University of Pittsburgh in Health and Rehabilitation Sciences in 1977.

== Career ==
He began his career as a physical therapist and was a physical conditioning and rehabilitation coach for the Philadelphia Flyers and an administrative director of the Sports Medicine Clinic of Haverford Community Hospital.

He is a black belt in taekwondo, and has commentated on Taekwondo during the 2016 Summer Olympics.

He founded Sports Physical Therapists in 1984 and grew the business into a chain of 40 centers spanning 11 states before selling it in 1993 for $40 million. Some of his clients included Mike Schmidt, Julius Erving and Charles Barkley.

=== Philadelphia 76ers ===
He was an athletic trainer for the Philadelphia 76ers for more than 10 years, originally hired to help thin 7'6" center Shawn Bradley bulk up.

He became president and minority owner of the Philadelphia 76ers basketball team in 1996 as part of a group led by Flyers founder Ed Snider and Comcast that bought the team. Under their ownership, the Sixers went from last place in 1996 to the NBA Finals in 2001. Croce has said of his ownership and management "It was never about basketball. The real value proposition was changing the city from 'can't do' to 'can do.'" Croce was also known for greeting fans personally and getting a front-row seat at home games for low-level 76ers staffers (including maintenance men, ushers, and concessionaires). He appeared on the cover of Success magazine as the first trainer to rise to an ownership position with a professional sports team. He has also been featured in Inc..

In June 2001, Croce refused to allow former President Bill Clinton into his private box during game 3 of the NBA Finals, as it would have inconvenienced friends, family, and dedicated Sixers fans.

He resigned as 76ers president after the 2001 season due to a dispute with Snider.

=== After the 76ers ===
Since leaving the 76ers, Croce was a television commentator on the NBA on NBC and was a taekwondo commentator for the 2004 Summer Olympics. In 2004, he hosted his own syndicated self-help television show, Pat Croce: Moving In, which premiered on September 13, 2004, and was canceled in 2005.

In January 2005, he opened the $10 million St. Augustine Pirate & Treasure Museum in Key West, Florida. The museum features authentic pirate artifacts, many from Croce's personal collection. In February 2006, he opened the pirate-themed Rum Barrel restaurant next to the museum. It was announced in February 2010 that the museum was being moved to St. Augustine, Florida. The museum opened on December 8, 2010.

Croce owns and operates, in conjunction with the University of Florida, the Colonial Quarter living-history museum in St. Augustine, Florida. It opened on March 16, 2013. As of January 2010, Croce serves on the board of directors for Movitas, a mobile technology company focused on the hospitality industry.

Croce was one of the four judges for the second season of ABC's reality television series, American Inventor, which ran from June to August, 2007.

In October 2011, he financed and served on the monumental expedition that located the shipwrecks of Sir Francis Drake.

== Books ==
His second book I Feel Great and You Will Too! was an autobiography that chronicled (among other things) his years at West Chester University and University of Pittsburgh, meeting his wife Diane Croce, starting his own business, purchasing the Sixers, and his 1999 motorcycle accident. The book is laced with career and personal advice Croce has gathered through his life. Following its release, the book made The New York Times Best Seller list. Croce has written other self-help books: 110% (2001); Lead Or Get Off The Pot (2004); Pat Croce's Victory Journal (2002); and the Do It Now! Journal (2004)—three of which topped The New York Times best-seller list.

Croce is also the author of several books on pirates, including Pirate Soul (2006) and My Pop Pop Is A Pirate (2008). More recently, Croce has written and released an illustrated book, Blackbeard, and The Pirate Handbook (both released in 2011). He is working on a series of historic fiction books based on the lives of pirates such as Sir Francis Drake and Henry Morgan.

- Conditioning for Ice Hockey: Year 'Round (co-authored with Bruce C. Cooper) (1983)
- Stretching for Athletics (1984)
- A Baseball Player's Guide to Sports Medicine (foreword by Mike Schmidt) (1997)
- I Feel Great and You Will Too! (co-authored with Bill Lyon) (2000)
- 110% (2001)
- Victory Journal (2002)
- Lead or Get Off the Pot!! (co-authored with Bill Lyon) (2004)
- Do It Now Journal (2004)
- Pirate Soul – A Swashbuckling Journey Through the Golden Age of Pirates (2006)
- My Pop-Pop is a Pirate (2008)
- Blackbeard (2011)
- Pirates of St. Augustine (2011)
- The Pirate Handbook (2011)
