= St. Augustine Pirate & Treasure Museum =

Museum dedicated to pirate artifacts

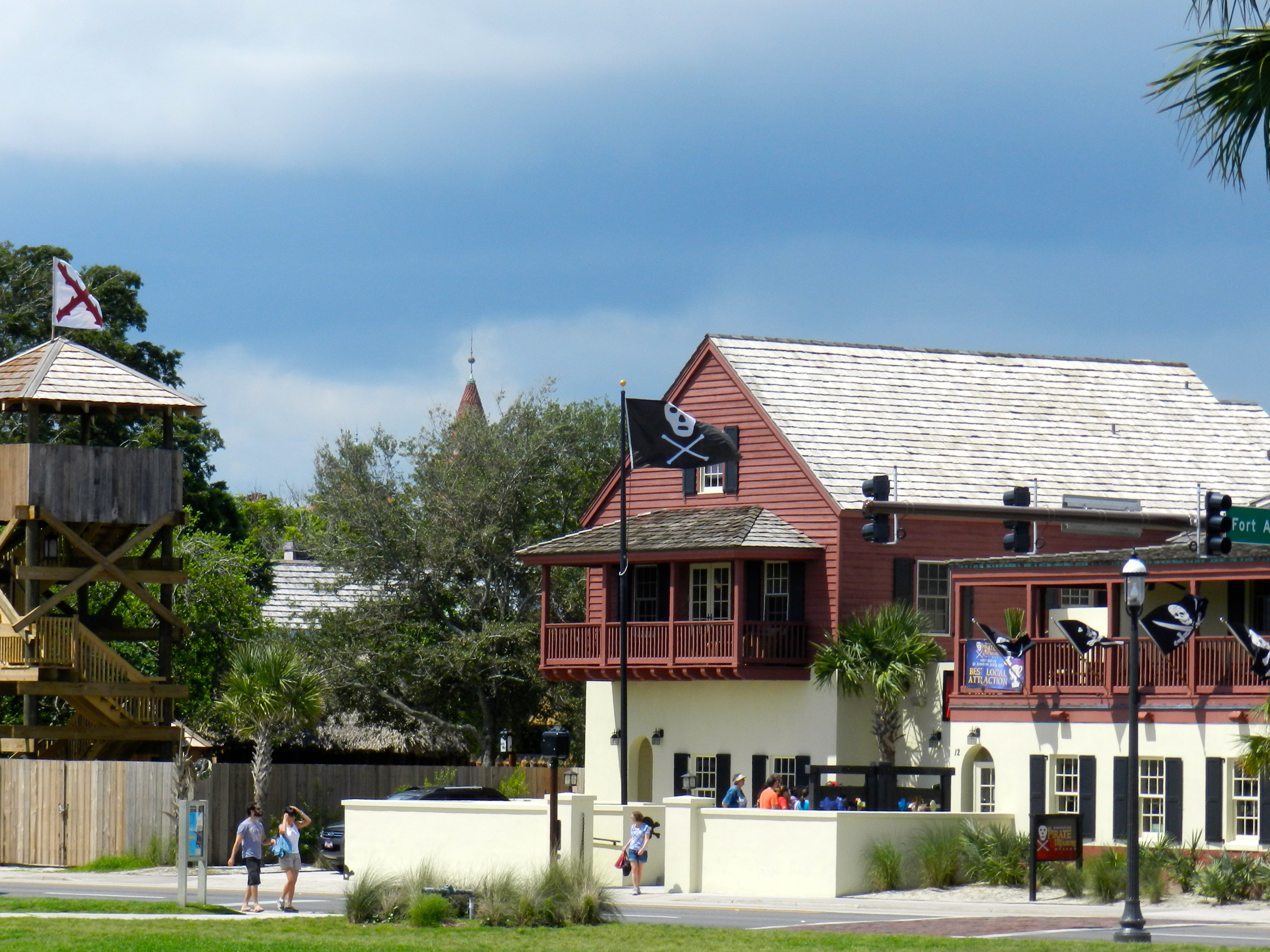

- Location within Florida
- Established: January 5, 2005
- Location: 12 South Castillo Drive; St Augustine, Florida
- Coordinates: 29.896911°N 81.31298°W
- Type: Pirate artifacts
- Director: Cindy Stavely
- Curator: Pat Croce
- Website: St. Augustine Pirate & Treasure Museum

The St. Augustine Pirate & Treasure Museum is a museum dedicated to pirate artifacts.

Formerly known as the Pirate Soul Museum, the museum was located at 524 Front Street, Key West, Florida, United States. It was announced in February 2010 that the museum was being moved to St Augustine, Florida. It reopened there on December 8, 2010, as the St. Augustine Pirate & Treasure Museum.

== Exhibits ==
The museum houses 48 individual exhibit areas, and over 800 artifacts inside. It has been proclaimed as the largest and most authentic collection of pirate artifacts ever displayed under one roof. Among its exhibits are Blackbeard's original blunderbuss, pieces of gold retrieved from his warship the Queen Anne's Revenge, one of only three remaining authentic Jolly Roger flags in the world, and Thomas Tew's original treasure chest, the only known authentic pirate treasure chest in the world.

== Audio show ==
In addition to the authentics, there are real cannons from the 18th century that guests are able to electronically fire off, as well as a Disney Imagineer's curated 3D Audio show, only existing in the St. Augustine Pirate and Treasure Museum. There are also tours offered on the weekends by "Pirate Tour Guides" throughout the day.

The museum was started by entrepreneur Pat Croce.
