= Brandweek =

American marketing magazine

- Categories: Marketing, Advertising, Events
- Frequency: Annual Events
- Publisher: Adweek
- First issue: 1986
- Final issue: April 2011
- Country: United States
- Language: English

Brandweek is a three-day brand marketing symposium and a part of Adweek, Llc. It was also previously a weekly American marketing trade publication that was published between 1986 and April 2011.

== Profile ==
Brandweek is a part of Adweek, covering the advertising and marketing industry. Brandweek, Mediaweek, and Adweek are owned by Beringer Capital, a Toronto-based private equity firm that invests in digital media and marketing services.

== History ==
First published in 1986 as Adweek's Marketing Week, the publication changed its name to Brandweek in 1992 after facing a legal threat from the UK's Marketing Week magazine. The publication was part of the Adweek Media Group of magazines owned by The Nielsen Company. It published 46 print issues a year in addition to Brandweek.com and a series of e-mail newsletters focusing on shopper, digital, Hispanic and green marketing.

In April 2011 Brandweek ceased its continuous print run as a distinct print magazine and was folded into Adweek and Adweek.com by its owners Prometheus Global Media. In February 2013 Prometheus announced the Brandweek Report, which appeared quarterly within the pages of Adweek and also appeared online and in Adweek's iPad edition.

In 2014, Prometheus Global Media, which also owned The Hollywood Reporter and Billboard, acquired Mediabistro.com and merged the editorial, job board and education platforms with Adweek (along with Brandweek and Mediaweek brands). The Clio Awards. Mediabistro, Adweek, Clio and Film Expo were then spun out from Guggenheim Partners/Prometheus Global into a new company, Mediabistro Holdings.

Beringer Capital acquired Adweek, Mediaweek and Brandweek from MediaBistro Holdings in July 2016.

In January 2018, Adweek CEO Jeffrey Litvack announced Brandweek, the event, as a first-of-its-kind brand summit held during September 23–25, 2018, in Palm Springs, California, at the Omni Rancho Las Palmas Resort & Spa. Brandweek is currently invitation-only.
