= Oak Island =

Island in Nova Scotia, Canada

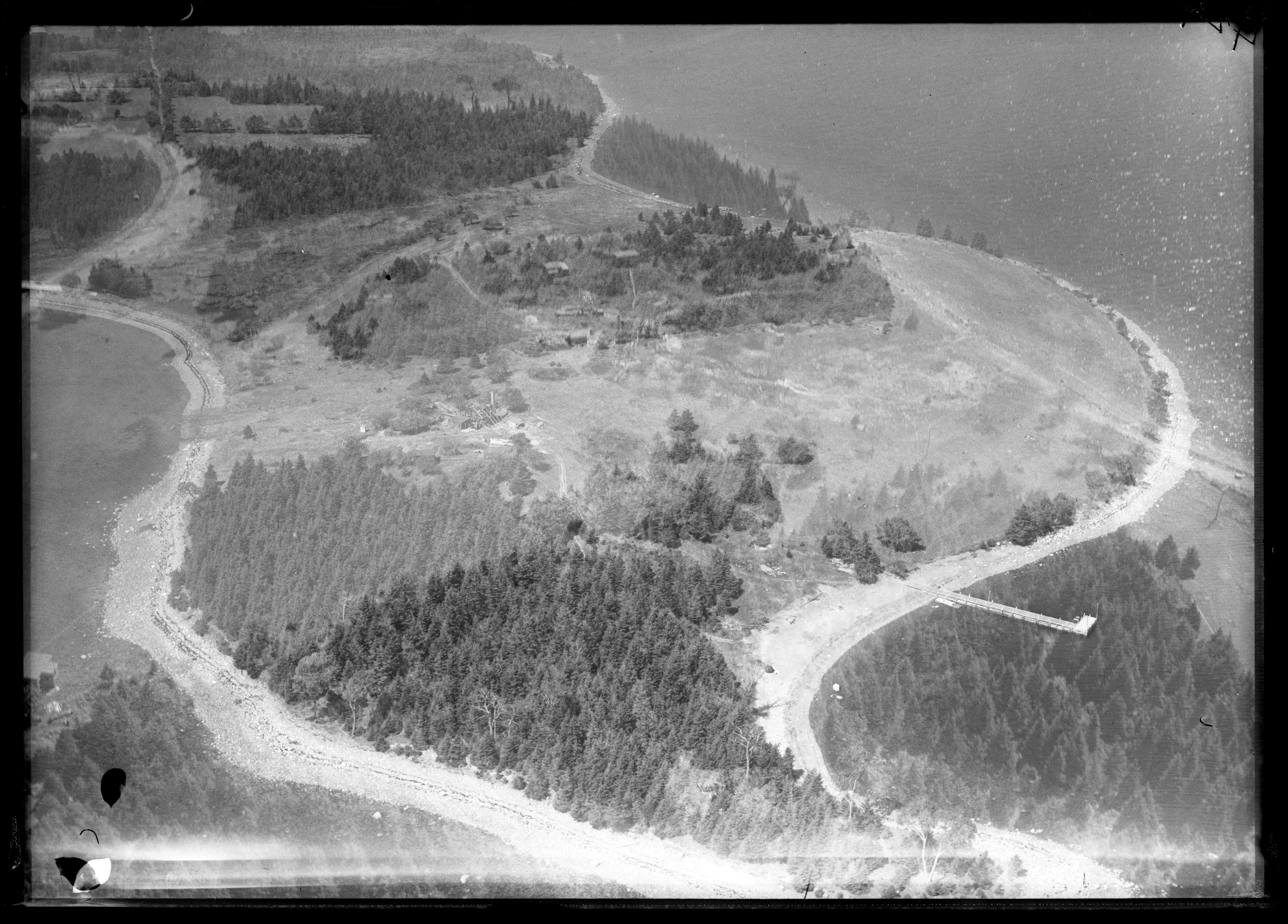
- Island and Wharf, 1931

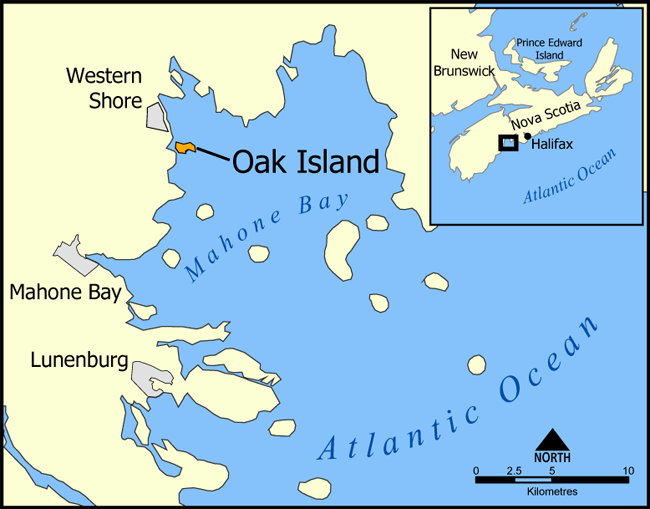

Geography
- Location: Nova Scotia, Canada
- Coordinates: 44°30′49″N 64°17′38″W
- Total islands: 1

Administration
- Canada
- Province: Nova Scotia

Demographics
- Population: Seasonal (Note: There were at least two recorded people living on the island until Dan Blankenship's death in March 2019.)

Oak Island is a privately owned island in Lunenburg County on the south shore of Nova Scotia, Canada. The tree-covered island is one of several islands in Mahone Bay, and is connected to the mainland by a causeway. The nearest community is the rural community of Western Shore which faces the island, while the nearest village is Chester.

The island is best known for theories about buried treasure and historical artifacts, and for the many attempts to find them. Treasure hunters have searched the island since the late 18th century, and accounts of its "Money Pit" have been published since 1857. Repeated excavations and investigations have not resolved the mystery, which has become part of North American folklore.

== Geography ==
=== Climate ===
The majority of Nova Scotia is a humid continental climate with hot and humid summers, and cold or frigid winters. While there is no weather station on the island or along Mahone Bay, there is one towards the west in the town of Bridgewater. The average annual temperature at Bridgewater is 7.1 °C (44.8 °F), with annual precipitation of 1,535.7 millimetres (60.46 in). The island and surrounding coasts can be hidden in fog for as many as 90 days a year. These coasts are also vulnerable to powerful storms which include nor'easters and hurricanes.

=== Ecology ===
Oak Island is made up of a temperate broadleaf and mixed forest, known regionally as the New England/Acadian forests. Wildlife in the Mahone Bay area includes great blue herons, black guillemots, osprey, Leach's storm petrels, and razorbills, as well as eagles and puffins. The roseate tern is an endangered species in Canada, and a recovery project running from 2003 to 2013 sought to re-establish a secure nesting colony for the birds on an island in Mahone Bay.

=== Geology ===
The geology of Oak Island was first mapped in 1924 by J. W. Goldthwait of the Geological Survey of Canada, who interpreted the island as a composite of four drumlins. These drumlins are "elongated hills" which consist of multiple layers of till resting on bedrock and are from different phases of glacial advance that span the past 75,000 years. The layers on top of the bedrock are mainly made up of "Lawrencetown" and slate till. The former of these two is considered a type of clay till which is made up of 50% sand, 30% silt, and 20% clay. In the main area that has been searched for treasure along with the till lie bits of anhydrite which become more competent deeper down. Researchers Les MacPhie, and John Wonnacott concluded that the deep deposits at the east end of the Island make up the drumlin formations.

There are two types of bedrock that lie under Oak Island; the southeastern portion consists of "Mississippian Windsor Group limestone" and gypsum, and the northwestern part is Cambro-Ordovician Halifax Formation slate. Oak Island and the area that is now Mahone Bay was once a lagoon 8,000 years BP, before the sea level rose with the melting glaciers. Dr. Ian Spooner of Acadia University has stated that the current triangular swamp on Oak Island was once a cove. Analysis done of core samples taken from the swamp show that a "significant saltwater intrusion" occurred as recently as the late 1300s or early 1400s. While Spooner said that this was likely from "human manipulation", he did not rule out the possibility of an enormous storm.

== Human history ==
The first known indigenous people in Nova Scotia are the Mi'kmaq, who have lived in present-day Nova Scotia and Newfoundland for several thousand years. The area that encompasses Oak Island was once known as the "Segepenegatig" region. While it is unknown when Europeans first encountered Oak Island, the earliest confirmed European residents date back to the 1750s when French fishermen built a few houses on the future site of the nearby village of Chester. Following the Expulsion of the Acadians during the Seven Years' War, the British authorities encouraged British colonists from New England to settle in Nova Scotia. Land was made available to settlers in 1759 through the Shorham grant, and Chester was officially founded that same year.

The first major group of settlers arrived in the Chester area from Massachusetts in 1761, and Oak Island was officially surveyed and divided into 32 four-acre lots in the following year. A large part of the island was owned at the time by the Monro, Lynch, Seacombe, and Young families who had been granted the land in 1759. In the early days of British settlement, the island was known locally as "Smith's Island", after an early settler of the area named Edward Smith. Cartographer Joseph Frederick Wallet DesBarres renamed the island "Gloucester Isle" in 1778. Shortly thereafter, the locally used name "Oak Island" was officially adopted for the Island. Early residents included Edward Smith in the 1760s and Anthony Vaughn Sr. in the early 1770s. In 1784, the government made additional land grants, this time to former soldiers, which included parts of Oak Island. It was not until July 6, 1818, that the original lot owners' names were mapped for the Nova Scotia Crown Lands office. Oak Island has been intermittently owned by treasure hunters ever since old legends were first published in 1857. The treasure hunt became so extensive that in 1965 a causeway was built from the western end of the island to Crandall's Point on the mainland, two hundred metres away in order to bring heavy machinery onto the island.

The most recent owners include a treasure hunter named Dan Blankenship, who initially partnered with "Oak Island Tours Inc.," run by David Tobias. Oak Island Tours eventually dissolved, and in February 2019 it was announced that a new partnership had been formed with a company called the "Michigan Group". This group consisted of brothers Rick and Marty Lagina, Craig Tester, and Alan Kostrzewa who had been purchasing lots from Tobias. Blankenship owned the island with the Michigan Group until his death on March 17, 2019, at the age of 95.

Oak Island is populated on a seasonal basis with two permanent homes and two cottages being occupied part-time. While the island remains private property, public access is granted to those who schedule tours ahead of time.

== Oak Island mystery ==
Oak Island has been a subject for treasure hunters ever since the late 1700s, with rumours that Captain Kidd's treasure was buried there. While there is little evidence to support what went on during the early excavations, stories began to be published and documented as early as 1857. Since that time there have been many theories that extend beyond that of Captain Kidd which include stories of religious artifacts, manuscripts, and Marie Antoinette's jewels. The "treasure" has also been prone to criticism by those who have dismissed search areas as natural phenomena.

Areas of interest on the island include a location on its east side known as the "Money Pit", the site of the original excavation. According to the often-retold story, a local youth named Daniel McInnis noticed a depression in the ground there in 1795 and began to dig with two friends; they reported finding a layer of flagstones and, about 10 feet (3.0 m) down, a tier of oak logs. The Onslow Company, which took up the search in the following decade, was said to have found oak platforms at intervals of about 10 feet (3.0 m) to a depth of about 90 feet (27 m), where the work was halted by flooding.

There is also a formation of boulders known as "Nolan's Cross", named after Fred Nolan, the surveyor and treasure hunter who identified it, and a triangle-shaped swamp. There has also been activity at a beach known as "Smith's Cove", where objects including non-native coconut fibre have been found. More recent archaeological discoveries in the Smith's Cove area have included an allegedly pre-15th-century lead cross and various wooden earthworks.

More than fifty books have been published recounting the island's history and exploring competing theories. Several works of fiction have also been based upon the Money Pit, including The Money Pit Mystery, Riptide, The Hand of Robin Squires, and Betrayed: The Legend of Oak Island. In January 2014, the History Channel began airing a reality TV show called The Curse of Oak Island about a group of modern treasure hunters. These hunters include brothers Rick and Marty Lagina of the "Michigan Group". The series has documented finds such as centuries-old coins, an antique brooch, and a lead cross that was allegedly made between 1200 and 1600 A.D.
