= John E. Mack =

American psychiatrist (1929–2004)

- Born: John Edward Mack; October 4, 1929; New York City, New York, U.S.
- Died: September 27, 2004 (aged 74); London, England
- Education: Oberlin College (BA); Harvard University (MD)
- Occupations: Professor; psychiatrist; writer
- Known for: Child psychology Adolescent psychology Psychology of religion
- Spouse: Sally (Stahl) Mack
- Children: Daniel, Kenneth, and Tony
- Parent(s): Edward C. Mack, Ruth P. Mack
- Relatives: Mary Lee Ingbar (half-sister)
- Awards: Pulitzer Prize
- Website: The John E Mack Institute

John Edward Mack (October 4, 1929 – September 27, 2004) was an American psychiatrist, writer, and professor of psychiatry. He served as the head of the department of psychiatry at Harvard Medical School from 1977 to 2004. In 1977, Mack won the Pulitzer Prize for his book A Prince of Our Disorder on T. E. Lawrence.

Mack's clinical expertise was in child psychology, adolescent psychology, and the psychology of religion. He was also known as a leading researcher on the psychology of teenage suicide and drug addiction, and he later became a researcher in the psychology of alien abduction experiences.

== Early life, education and military service ==
Mack was born in New York City to an academic German Jewish family. His father, the historian Edward Clarence Mack (1904–1973), was a professor at CUNY, while his mother Eleanor Liebmann Mack (1905–1930) died while John was an infant. After his mother died, his father married the economist Ruth P. Mack, through which he had a half-sister, Mary Lee Ingbar, a pioneer of computer analysis who became a professor at Dartmouth College and University of Massachusetts Medical School. As John grew up, his father would read the Bible to him and his sister, but as a work of culture or literature. Mack graduated from the Horace Mann-Lincoln School in 1947 and Phi Beta Kappa from Oberlin in 1951 and received his medical doctorate degree cum laude from Harvard Medical School in 1955. Mack subsequently interned at the Massachusetts General Hospital and trained as a psychiatrist at the Massachusetts Mental Health Center.

In 1959, Mack joined the United States Air Force, serving as a medic in Japan, where he rose to the rank of captain. In 1961, he returned from military service in Japan, continuing at the Massachusetts Mental Health Center and Boston Psychoanalytic Society and Institute, receiving certification in child and adult psychoanalysis and psychotherapy. From 1964, Mack returned to Harvard Medical School, becoming a full professor at Harvard in 1972. In 1977, he became the chairman of the executive committee of Psychiatry at Harvard Medical School, which position he occupied until his death in 2004.

Mack published over 150 scientific articles and eleven books in his career. As department head at Harvard Medical School, he worked primarily in the field of child and adolescent psychology. He worked on treating suicidal patients and published research on heroin addiction. The dominant theme of his life's work at Harvard had been the exploration of how one's perceptions of the world affect one's relationships. He addressed this issue of "world view" on the individual level in his early clinical explorations of dreams, nightmares and teen suicide, and in A Prince of Our Disorder, his biographical study of the life of British officer T. E. Lawrence, for which he received the Pulitzer Prize for Biography in 1977.

== Activism during the Cold War ==
In the 1980s, Mack interviewed many international political figures as part of his research into the root causes of the Cold War, including former United States President Jimmy Carter and the "father of the hydrogen bomb", Edward Teller.

Mack, together with astrophysicist Carl Sagan and other Physicians for Social Responsibility (the United States affiliate of International Physicians for the Prevention of Nuclear War), promoted the elimination of nuclear weapons and an end to the simmering conflict between the United States and the Soviet Union. Emboldened by the organization's receipt of the Nobel Peace Prize in 1985, Mack, Sagan, and 700 other academics walked upon the grounds of the Nevada Test Site in the summer of 1986, setting a civil disobedience record for that nuclear weapons testing facility.

== Psychology of alien abduction phenomena ==
In the early 1990s, Mack commenced a decade-plus psychological study of 200 men and women who reported recurrent alien encounter experiences. Such encounters had seen some limited attention from academic figures, R. Leo Sprinkle perhaps being the earliest, in the 1960s. Mack, however, remains probably the most esteemed academic to have studied the subject.

He initially suspected that such persons were suffering from mental illness, but when no obvious pathologies were present in the persons he interviewed, his interest was piqued. Following encouragement from longtime friend Thomas Kuhn, who predicted that the subject might be controversial, but urged Mack to collect data and ignore prevailing materialist, dualist and "either/or" analysis, Mack began concerted study and interviews. Many of those he interviewed reported that their encounters had affected the way they regarded the world, including producing a heightened sense of spirituality and environmental concern.

Mack was somewhat more guarded in his investigations and interpretations of the abduction phenomenon than were earlier researchers. Literature professor Terry Matheson writes that "On balance, Mack does present as fair-minded an account as has been encountered to date, at least as these abduction narratives go." In a 1994 interview, Jeffrey Mishlove stated that Mack seemed "inclined to take these [abduction] reports at face value". Mack replied by saying "Face value I wouldn't say. I take them seriously. I don't have a way to account for them." In a 1996 interview with PBS, he stated '' There are aspects of this which I believe we are justified in taking quite literally. That is, UFOs are in fact observed, filmed on camera at the same time that people are having their abduction experiences....It's both literally, physically happening to a degree; and it's also some kind of psychological, spiritual experience occurring and originating perhaps in another dimension.'' The BBC quoted Mack as saying, "I would never say, yes, there are aliens taking people. [But] I would say there is a compelling powerful phenomenon here, that I can't account for in any other way, that's mysterious. Yet I can't know what it is, but it seems to me that it invites a deeper, further inquiry."

Mack noted that there was a worldwide history of visionary experiences, especially in pre-industrial societies. One example is the vision quest common to some Native American cultures. Only fairly recently in Western culture, notes Mack, have such visionary events been interpreted as aberrations or as mental illness. Mack suggested that abduction accounts might best be considered as part of this larger tradition of visionary encounters.

His interest in the spiritual or transformational aspects of people's alien encounters and his suggestion that the experience of alien contact itself may be more transcendent than physical in nature – yet nonetheless real – set him apart from many of his contemporaries, such as Budd Hopkins, who advocated the physical reality of aliens.

His later research broadened into the general consideration of the merits of an expanded notion of reality, one which allows for experiences that may not fit the Western materialist paradigm, yet deeply affect people's lives. His second (and final) book on the alien encounter experience, Passport to the Cosmos: Human Transformation and Alien Encounters (1999), was as much a philosophical treatise connecting the themes of spirituality and modern world-views as it was the culmination of his work with the "experiencers" of alien encounters, to whom the book is dedicated.

In 1993, with funding from philanthropist Laurance Rockefeller, Mack founded the Program for Extraordinary Experience Research (PEER) at Harvard's Cambridge Hospital. PEER studied anomalous experiences reported by otherwise healthy individuals, focusing less on whether alien encounters were literally real than on how such experiences transformed the people who had them. The program ran until 2002 and was succeeded by the John E. Mack Institute.

In November 1994, Mack travelled to Ruwa, Zimbabwe, to interview children at the Ariel School who claimed that they had seen a UFO land near their school and aliens exit the craft.

== Investigation by Harvard ==
In May 1994, the Dean of Harvard Medical School, Daniel C. Tosteson, appointed a committee of peers to confidentially review Mack's clinical care and clinical investigation of the people who had shared their alien encounters with him (some of their cases were written of in Mack's 1994 book Abduction). Angela Hind wrote, "It was the first time in Harvard's history that a tenured professor was subjected to such an investigation."

The committee chairman was Arnold "Budd" Relman, M.D., a professor of Medicine and of Social Medicine at Harvard Medical School who served as editor of The New England Journal of Medicine. According to Daniel P. Sheehan, one of Mack's attorneys, the committee's draft report suggested that "To communicate, in any way whatsoever, to a person who has reported a ‘close encounter’ with an extraterrestrial life form that this experience might well have been real ... is professionally irresponsible.”

Upon the public revelation of the existence of the committee (inadvertently revealed during the solicitation of witnesses for Mack's defense, ten months into the process), questions arose from the academic community (including Harvard Professor of Law Alan Dershowitz) regarding the validity of an investigation of a tenured professor who was not suspected of ethics violations or professional misconduct. Concluding the fourteen-month investigation, Harvard then issued a statement stating that the Dean had "reaffirmed Dr. Mack's academic freedom to study what he wishes and to state his opinions without impediment," concluding "Dr. Mack remains a member in good standing of the Harvard Faculty of Medicine." (Mack was censured in the committee's report for what they believed were methodological errors, but Dean Tosteson took no action based on the committee's assessment.) He had received legal help from Roderick MacLeish and Daniel Sheehan (of the Pentagon Papers case), and the support of Laurance Rockefeller, who also funded Mack's non-profit organization for four consecutive years at $250,000 per year.

== Death ==
On Monday, September 27, 2004, while in London to lecture at a T. E. Lawrence Society-sponsored conference, Mack was killed by a drunk driver heading west on Totteridge Lane. He was walking home alone, after a dinner with friends, when he was struck at 11:25 p.m. near the junction of Totteridge Lane and Longland Drive. He lost consciousness at the scene of the crash and was pronounced dead shortly thereafter. The driver, Raymond Czechowski, an IT manager, was arrested at the scene and later entered a plea of guilty to careless driving while under the influence of alcohol. Mack's family requested leniency for the driver in a letter to the Wood Green Crown Court. "Although this was a tragic event for our family," the letter reads, "we feel [the accused's] behavior was neither malicious nor intentional, and we have no ill will toward him since we learned of the circumstances of the collision." The driver, Ray Czechowski, served 6 months and was disqualified from driving for 3 years.

== Works ==
He wrote the following books:

- Passport to the Cosmos: Human Transformation and Alien Encounters (1999)
- Abduction: Human Encounters with Aliens (1994)
- A Prince of Our Disorder: The Life of T. E. Lawrence (1976)
- Nightmares and Human Conflict (1970)

Collaborations:

- The Alchemy of Survival: One Woman's Journey (1988)
- Vivienne: The Life and Suicide of an Adolescent School Girl (1977)

He was editor or co-editor of:

- Mind Before Matter: Vision of a New Science of Consciousness (2007; succeeded by Paul Devereux)
- Alien Discussions: Proceedings of the Abduction Study Conference Held at M.I.T. Cambridge, MA (1995)
- Human Feelings: Explorations in Affect Development and Meaning (1993)
- Development and Sustenance of Self-Esteem in Childhood (1984)
- Borderline States in Psychiatry – Seminars in Psychiatry (1975)

Unpublished:

- When Worldviews Collide: A Paradigmatic Passion Play, a manuscript about the Harvard inquiry, was largely complete at the time of his death and in the 2010s was optioned for feature film development.
- Elisabeth and Mark Before and After Death: The Power of a Field of Love, described in Vanity Fair as an unpublished manuscript about Dr. Elisabeth Targ, in fact exists only as an outline and as hours of interview transcripts.

He also wrote the foreword to Paths Beyond Ego: The Transpersonal Vision (1993), the introductions to The PK Man: A True Story of Mind Over Matter (2000) by Jeffrey Mishlove and Secret Life (1992) by David M. Jacobs, and he contributed chapters to several books including The Long Darkness: Psychological and Moral Perspectives on Nuclear Winter (1986), The Psychology of Terrorism Vol. 1: A Public Understanding (2002), and The Psychospiritual Clinician's Handbook (2005).

== Popular culture ==
- A biography, The Believer: Alien Encounters, Hard Science, and the Passion of John Mack, by former New York Times reporter Ralph Blumenthal was published by High Road Books in March 2021.
- He was illustrated by cartoonist Roz Chast in a four-page color strip, Aliens, Ahoy!, originally published in Duke University's DoubleTake magazine, Winter 1999 issue, and reprinted in the book, Theories of Everything: Selected, Collected, Health-Inspected Cartoons by Roz Chast
- He appears as a character in William Baer's book of poetry, The Unfortunates (1997).
- In the French TV show Profilage, John Mack is quoted by the character of Chloé, in the episode "OVNI" ("UFO") (episode 8 of season 6, aired November 26, 2015).
- John Mack was technical advisor for the TV movie Intruders.
- John Mack was featured in the 2020 documentary The Phenomenon.
- John Mack was featured in the 2022 documentary Ariel Phenomenon about the Ariel School UFO incident.

== Archives of the Impossible ==
The Archives of the Impossible (AOTI) of Rice University at Houston, Texas is a special collection founded in 2014 by Jeffrey J. Kripal, a professor of religion. AOTI is based at the Woodson Research Center (WRC) and materials are housed in the Fondren Library. AOTI holds a collection of material from Mack. Karin Austin, previously Mack's personal and research assistant, worked with his family after his death in 2004 and later Rice University, Kripal and the (WRC) on assembling and digitizing the Mack collections. Austin became AOTI project manager in 2024. Rice University in 2024 began a two-year study of the materials in AOTI, after ten years of collection and archival work. The research included artificial intelligence driven analysis of the Mack materials. Rice University began an extensive de-identification process for Mack's collection, to protect the identities of claimed experiencers in medical records. Once completed for accession, the Mack collection will contain 450 linear feet of materials.

== See also ==
- List of Ig Nobel Prize winners
