= Archives of the Impossible =

Special collection in Texas, U.S.

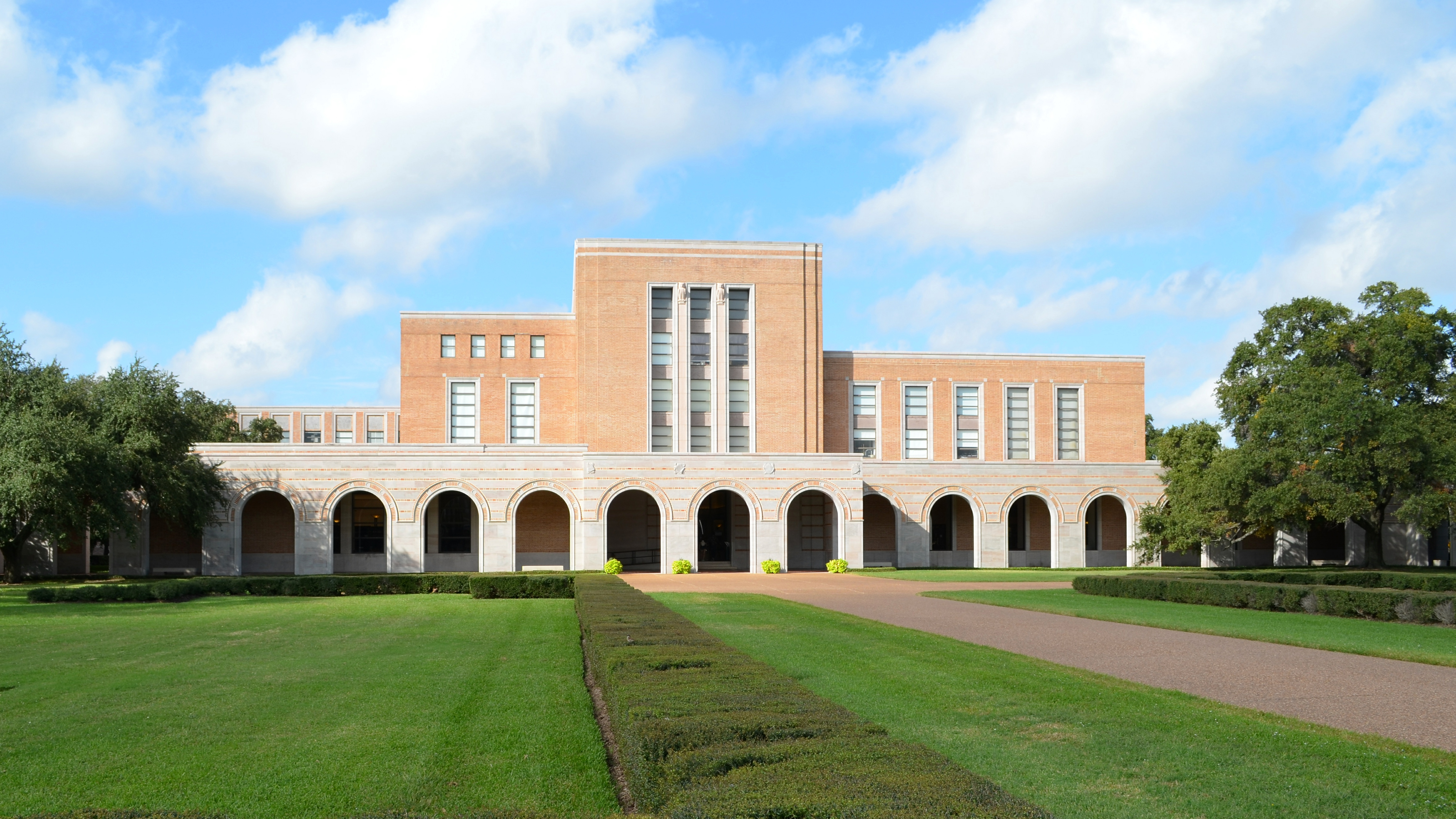
- 29°43′05″N 95°24′01″W
- Location: Woodson Research Center in the Fondren Library, Rice University, Houston, Texas, United States
- Scope: Paranormal, UFO, and anomalous phenomena research archives
- Established: 2014

Access and use
- Circulation: Special collection (rare materials): does not circulate

Other information
- Director: Jeffrey J. Kripal (Curator), Amanda Focke (special collections)
- Affiliation: Rice University School of Humanities
- Public transit access: METRORail Red Line (Hermann Park/Rice University station)
- Website: impossiblearchives.rice.edu

The Archives of the Impossible (AOTI), sometimes called the Center for the Impossible, is a special collection at Rice University in Houston, Texas, United States. Founded in 2014 by Jeffrey J. Kripal, AOTI is based at the Woodson Research Center in the Fondren Library. It stewards collections on UFO and paranormal subjects, including the papers of Jacques Vallée, declassified United States Army Stargate Project materials, correspondence sent to Whitley Strieber after the publication of Communion, and materials related to John E. Mack. By 2025 the archive comprised eighteen collections and more than a million documents, has been identified by the Washington Library Association as the first publicly accessible archive in which UFO and paranormal research materials are a primary focus, hosts recurring conferences at Rice, and since 2024 has supported a two-year research initiative on its collections.

== Details ==
The Archives of the Impossible (AOTI), also known as the Center for the Impossible of Rice University at Houston, Texas, is a special collection founded in 2014 by Jeffrey J. Kripal, a professor of religion. Writing in the Journal of Transpersonal Psychology, Mark Ryan wrote in 2025 that the Archives were incorporated into and a part of the Center for the Impossible. AOTI is based at the Woodson Research Center (WRC). AOTI materials are housed in the Fondren Library. Kripal is director and curator of AOTI and Amanda Focke is head of special collections at the project.

AOTI was identified by the Washington Library Association (WLA) in their journal Alki as the first such publicly accessible archive of UFO and paranormal research materials as "a primary focus". Besides UFO and alien abduction material, Kripal has stated that the archive also holds collections on mediumship, out-of-body experiences and telepathy. Kripal compared AOTI with earlier parapsychological archives at the University of West Georgia and Duke University, noting that the largest related collection is the Archives for the Unexplained in Norrköping, Sweden.

Kripal developed AOTI by building relationships with other researchers over time, with their team at Rice identifying collections to consider for accession. According to Oxford American, the project aimed to counter "damage" caused to the study of such topics by the Condon Committee report in 1969. By 2024, AOTI contained fifteen separate collections of materials. AOTI was identified as the "most utilized collection within the institution" by A. Focke of the Rice University Woodson Research Center in May 2023, according to the WLA. The physical collection archives are maintained in climate-controlled storage off-site from the main Rice University campus. The overall size of the collections in 2024 was estimated at "certainly over a million documents" by Kripal. Access to the archives is available by request for review locally in the Fondren Library reading room, as well as digital archives on Rice websites with additional oral histories available.

== History ==
AOTI was initiated with a donation by French ufologist and author Jacques Vallée of his collected lifetime research materials. Vallée initially asked Kripal in December 2014 if he could help locate a university archive to store his collections, due to worries about "potential loss or commercialization" of his research. After four years of negotiation, Vallée donated his collection to AOTI. Vallée formalized the accession process at Rice by holding a lecture of his research in 2018. In 2022, Wired reported that Vallée's collection in AOTI would include files on about 500 anomalous events that he had investigated.

AOTI holds a collection of material from John E. Mack of Harvard University. Karin Austin, previously Mack's personal and research assistant, worked with his family after Mack's death in 2004, and later worked with Rice University, Kripal and the WRC on assembling and digitizing the Mack collections. Austin became AOTI project manager in 2024. Rice University began an extensive de-identification process for Mack's collection, to protect the identities of claimed experiencers in medical records. Similar anonymization efforts were reported underway for the Strieber collection.

Kripal remarked in 2025 that "now we call it the Center of the Impossible." According to Kripal, AOTI encompasses "the whole university", by including matters of anthropology, art, astronomy, biology, genetics, history, philosophy, and physics. Rice University in 2024 began a two-year study of the materials in AOTI, after ten years of collection and archival work. The research included artificial intelligence driven analysis of the Strieber and Mack collections. The metadata study, according to Global Policy, "uses a phenomenological method that brackets assumptions about the ultimate cause or ontological status of the experiences," to create a review of all patterns and details of historical reports.

== Conferences ==
Conferences for AOTI, which are held at Rice University, occurred in 2022, 2023 and in 2025; the university reported in 2025 that videos of conference panels had surpassed 300,000 views. In 2025, Rice University hosted the conference, The Archives of the Impossible: The UFO and the Impossible, drawing three hundred attendees.

== In media and documentary interest ==
AOTI has drawn filmmakers; Rice University reported that by 2024, "half a dozen" production crews had visited the archives. Kripal stated in a 2025 interview with The Sun that an ABC News crew had recently visited AOTI.

In 2026, AOTI served as the basis for Archive X: Unexplained Phenomena, a six-part documentary television series hosted by Kripal himself, which premiered on SundanceTV, AMC+, and All Reality on October 1. Filmed partly at Rice University's Woodson Research Center, the series draws on the archive's collections to examine reported paranormal experiences, combining historical records with contemporary eyewitness accounts. Featured research materials include the collections of psychiatrist John E. Mack and author Whitley Strieber. The episodes cover subjects including telepathy, alleged alien abductions, precognition, mediumship, and near-death experiences.

== Collections ==
In October 2025, Kripal reported that AOTI had grown to eighteen collections. AOTI houses mail correspondences that Whitley Strieber, author of the book Communion, received from the public about their reported alien abduction claims. Kripal highlighted 3,400 letters to Strieber in particular; Strieber had received hundreds of thousands of letters that his wife Anne curated, and the particularly significant letters were donated to AOTI. Additional collections to AOTI were donated by Larry W. Bryant, Brenda Denzler, Richard F. Haines, R. Leo Sprinkle and Wendelle C. Stevens. Both the Sprinkle and Vallée materials have embargoes requested by the creators on some content due to their "sensitive nature", according to the journal of the WLA.

AOTI holds declassified research material of the United States Army's 1972–1995 Stargate Project. Christopher Senn was identified as organizing the Stargate Project collection for Rice University. The collection was donated by Edwin May, the U.S. Army's program director from 1985 to 1995. In Routledge's Handbook of Religion and Secrecy by Hugh Urban and Paul Christopher Johnson, Kripal and Senn detailed that May's donation to AOTI encompassed thousands of pages of declassified materials.

The archives were described in In Town Magazine by Virginia Billeaud Andrerson as holding "thousands" of "firsthand abduction accounts". KPRC-TV described AOTI collections as containing "photos, drawings, sketches, and personal testimonies, all claiming to document encounters with the unknown". Editor Derek Askey of The Sun in 2025 detailed his visit to AOTI, and his examination of materials from the government's Stargate Project and Communion readers. Writing in Global Policy, Austin, Bohlander and Engles describe AOTI as containing "detailed accounts" by people "adamant the experiences unfolded as they describe".

=== Collection details ===
- Larry Bryant, 1920–2010, 103 linear feet, accessioned 2019.
- Brenda Denzler, 1990s–2000s, 10 linear feet, accessioned 2019–2020.
- Richard F. Haynes, 1947–2015, 17 linear feet, accessioned 2020.
- John E. Mack, 450 linear feet of materials, accession ongoing.
- Edwin C. May, Stargate Project materials, 1972–1995.
- R. Leo Sprinkle, 1961–2017, 77.9 cubic feet, additional 13.6 GB of content, accessioned 2004–2018. Some material under embargo.
- Wendelle C. Stevens, 8 linear feet, accessioned 2023.
- Whitley Strieber, 1970–2016, 9 linear feet, multiple boxes of correspondence, accessioned 2023.
- Jacques Vallée, 1960–2015, 38 linear feet, some material under embargo until 2028–2031, accessioned 2018.

== Reception ==
Kimberly Engels wrote in the journal Sartre Studies International that the project may "shift how these encounters" are considered and reviewed.

== See also ==
- Center for UFO Studies
- Parapsychology
- Project Blue Book
- Ufology
