= Jeffrey J. Kripal =

American college professor (born 1962)

- Education: Conception Seminary College (BA); University of Chicago (PhD)
- Known for: Archives of the Impossible
- Scientific career
- Fields: study of comparative erotics and ethics in mystical literature, American countercultural translations of Asian religions, and the history of Western esotericism from gnosticism to New Age religions
- Workplaces: Rice University

Jeffrey John Kripal (born 1962) is an American religious studies scholar. He is the J. Newton Rayzor Chair in Philosophy and Religious Thought at Rice University in Houston, Texas. While chairman of the Religion Department at Rice, he helped found their "GEM" program, with a doctoral concentration in "Gnosticism, Esotericism, and Mysticism".

His work includes the study of comparative erotics and ethics in mystical literature, American countercultural translations of Asian religions, and the history of Western esotericism from gnosticism to New Age religions. Kripal is the founder of the Archives of the Impossible.

== Career ==
Kripal's first book, Kali's Child: The Mystical and the Erotic in the Life and Teachings of Ramakrishna, analyzed the Bengali mystic Ramakrishna. Taking a psychoanalytic approach, Kripal argued that Ramakrishna's mystical experiences involved a strong homoerotic dimension. The book won the American Academy of Religion's History of Religions Prize for the Best First Book of 1995. A second, revised edition was published in 1998.

Kali's Child has been dogged by controversy ever since its initial publication in 1995. Its claims have been questioned by Alan Roland and other scholars, as well as members of the Ramakrishna Mission such as Swami Tyagananda and Pravrajika Vrajaprana. Translation errors have been a frequent target, although Bengal scholar Brian Hatcher has defended Kripal's translations. Rajiv Malhotra criticized Kripal (along with Wendy Doniger and many other scholars of India) in the book Invading the Sacred: An Analysis of Hinduism Studies in America.

Kripal has responded to the book's critics but shifted his research focus away from Hinduism afterward, saying, “I stuck with it and responded as best as I could for about six or seven years. It just wore me down after a while. At some point I felt like it wasn’t worth it anymore, that it was starting to affect my health. I couldn’t go anywhere, any conference or anything, without having to deal with the thought police, as it were.”

Kripal's 2001 book Roads of Excess, Palaces of Wisdom: Eroticism and Reflexivity in the Study of Mysticism is a study of five religious studies scholars: Evelyn Underhill, Louis Massignon, R. C. Zaehner, Agehananda Bharati, and Elliot Wolfson. In 2007 the University of Chicago Press released Esalen: America and the Religion of No Religion, Kripal's account of the Esalen Institute, the retreat center and think-tank located in Big Sur, California. Writing in the Journal of American History, Catherine Albanese called it "a highly personal account that is also a superb historiographical exercise and a masterful work of analytical cultural criticism."

In the 2010s and 2020s Kripal turned his attention to the paranormal, releasing four scholarly volumes and three popular books (one coauthored with Whitley Strieber) on the subject. Authors of the Impossible (2011) traces the history of psychic phenomena over the last two centuries. The book profiles four writers: the British psychical researcher F. W. H. Myers, the American anomalist writer and humorist Charles Fort, the astronomer, computer scientist, and ufologist Jacques Vallee, and the French philosopher Bertrand Méheust. How to Think Impossibly: About Souls, UFOs, Time, Belief, and Everything Else (2024) introduces the idea to ‘think-with’ the ‘experiencers’ of the paranormal as a means to treating them as genuine experiencers.

== Archives of the Impossible ==
The Archives of the Impossible at Rice University are a special collection founded in 2014 by Kripal. AOTI is based at the Woodson Research Center. AOTI materials are housed in the Fondren Library. AOTI was identified by the Washington Library Association as the first publicly accessible archive with UFO and paranormal research materials as "a primary focus".

In 2026, Kripal began hosting Archive X: Unexplained Phenomena, a six-part documentary series that premiered on SundanceTV, AMC+, and All Reality on October 1. The series draws on the Archives of the Impossible to combine historical research materials with firsthand accounts of reported anomalous experiences, including alleged alien abductions, telepathy, precognition, and near-death experiences.

== Bibliography ==
=== Books authored ===
- Kali's Child: The Mystical and the Erotic in the Life and Teachings of Ramakrishna (Chicago, 1995, 1998) ISBN 978-0-226-45377-4
- Roads of Excess, Palaces of Wisdom: Eroticism and Reflexivity in the Study of Mysticism (Chicago, 2001) ISBN 978-0-226-45379-8
- The Serpent's Gift: Gnostic Reflections on the Study of Religion (University of Chicago Press, 2006) ISBN 978-0-226-45381-1
- Esalen: America and the Religion of No Religion (Chicago, 2007) ISBN 978-0-226-45370-5
- Authors of the Impossible: The Paranormal and the Sacred (University of Chicago Press, 2010) ISBN 978-0-226-45386-6
- Mutants and Mystics: Science Fiction, Superhero Comics, and the Paranormal (Chicago: University of Chicago Press, 2011) ISBN 978-0-226-45383-5
- Super Natural: A New Vision of the Unexplained, with Whitley Strieber (New York: Tarcher, Penguin, 2016) ISBN 978-1-101-98232-7
- Secret Body: Erotic and Esoteric Currents in the History of Religions (Chicago: University of Chicago Press, 2017) ISBN 978-0-226-12682-1
- Changed in a Flash: One Woman's Near-Death Experience and Why a Scholar Thinks It Empowers Us All, with Elizabeth G. Krohn (Berkeley, California: North Atlantic Books, 2018) ISBN 978-1-623-17303-6
- The Flip: Epiphanies of Mind and the Future of Knowledge (New York: Bellevue Literary Press, 2019) ISBN 978-1942658528
- The Superhumanities: Historical Precedents, Moral Objections, New Realities (Chicago: University of Chicago Press, 2022) ISBN 978-0226820248
- How to Think Impossibly: About Souls, UFOs, Time, Belief, and Everything Else (Chicago: University of Chicago Press, 2024) ISBN 978-0226833682

=== Books edited ===
- Vishnu on Freud's Desk: A Reader in Psychoanalysis and Hinduism edited with T.G. Vaidyanathan (Oxford, 1999) ISBN 978-0-19-565835-4
- Crossing Boundaries: Essays on the Ethical Status of Mysticism edited with G. William Barnard (Seven Bridges, 2002) ISBN 978-1-889119-25-0
- Encountering Kali: In the Margins, at the Center, in the West edited with Rachel Fell McDermott (California, 2003) ISBN 978-0-520-23240-2
- On the Edge of the Future: Esalen and the Evolution of American Culture edited with Glenn Shuck (Indiana, 2005) ISBN 978-0-253-34556-1
- Hidden Intercourse: Eros and Sexuality in the History of Western Esotericism edited with Wouter J. Hanegraaff (New York, 2010) ISBN 978-0-823-23341-0

=== Articles and essays ===
- Mystical Homoeroticism, Reductionism, and the Reality of Censorship: A Response to Gerald James Larson. Journal of the American Academy of Religion, volume 66, number 3, pages 627–635 (1998).
- Textuality, Sexuality, and the Future of the Past: A Response to Swami Tyagananda. Evam: Forum on Indian Representations, volume 1, issues 1–2, pages 191–205 (2002).
- Foreword to Adi Da's The Knee of Listening (2003)
- Comparative Mystics: Scholars as Gnostic Diplomats. Common Knowledge, volume 3 issue 10, pages 485–517 (2004)
- "Sexuality (Overview)". The Encyclopedia of Religion, 2nd edition (2005)
- "Phallus and Vagina"." In Encyclopedia of Religion (2005)
- Reality Against Society: William Blake, Antinomianism, and the American Counter Culture. Common Knowledge, volume 13, issue 1 (Winter 2007)
- Re-membering Ourselves: Some Countercultural Echoes of Contemporary Tantric Studies, lead-essay of inaugural issue, Journal of South Asian Religion, volume 1 issue 1 (2007)
- "Liminal Pedagogy: The Liberal Arts and the Transforming Ritual of Religious Studies." in How Should We Talk About Religion? Perspectives, Contexts, Particularities, edited by J. White (University of Notre Dame Press, 2006)
- "Western Popular Culture, Hindu Influences On." In The Encyclopedia of Hinduism edited by D. Cush, C. Robinson, and M. York, Routledge/Curzon (2007)
- "The Rise of the Imaginal: Psychical Phenomena on the Horizon of Theory (Again)". Religious Studies Review volume 33 issue 3 (2007)
- "Myth" in The Blackwell Companion to the Study of Religion edited by R. Segal. Wiley-VCH (2008)

== See also ==
- Academic study of new religious movements
