= Jacques Vallée =

French computer scientist and ufologist (born 1939)

- Vallée in 2024
- Born: Jacques Fabrice Vallée; September 24, 1939 (age 87); Pontoise, Seine-et-Oise, France
- Occupations: Venture capitalist, computer scientist, engineer, author, ufologist
- Spouse: Janine Saley (died 2010)
- Children: 2

Academic background
- Education: University of Paris (BS); University of Lille Nord de France (MS); Northwestern University (PhD)
- Thesis: Search strategies and retrieval languages (1967)
- Doctoral advisor: Gilbert Krulee
- Other advisors: Gérard de Vaucouleurs; J. Allen Hynek; Douglas Engelbart

Academic work
- Institutions: McDonald Observatory; Royal Dutch Shell; Stanford University; SRI International; Sofinnova
- Website: www.jacquesvallee.net

Jacques Fabrice Vallée (French: [ʒak fabʁis vale]; born September 24, 1939) is a French Internet pioneer, computer scientist, venture capitalist, author, ufologist and astronomer currently residing in San Francisco, California and Paris, France.

His scientific career began as a professional astronomer at the Paris Observatory. Vallée co-developed the first computerized map of Mars for NASA in 1963. He later worked on the network information center for the ARPANET, a precursor to the modern Internet, as a staff engineer of SRI International's Augmentation Research Center (ARC) under Douglas Engelbart.

Vallée is also an important figure in the study of unidentified flying objects (UFOs), and unidentified anomalous phenomena (UAPs). Vallée was first noted for his defense of the scientific legitimacy of the extraterrestrial hypothesis and later for promoting the interdimensional hypothesis.

== Early life ==
Vallée was born in Pontoise, France in 1939. He completed his undergraduate degree in mathematics at the University of Paris in 1959 and received the equivalent of an MS in astrophysics from the University of Lille Nord de France in 1961. He began his professional life as an astronomer at the Paris Observatory in 1961. He was awarded the Jules Verne Prize for his first science fiction novel, Le Sub-espace (1961), published under the pseudonym of Jérôme Sériel.

== Academic and business career ==
Vallée moved to the United States in 1962 and began working as a research associate in astronomy under Gérard de Vaucouleurs at the University of Texas at Austin. While at McDonald Observatory, he compiled NASA's first detailed informational map of Mars with de Vaucouleurs.

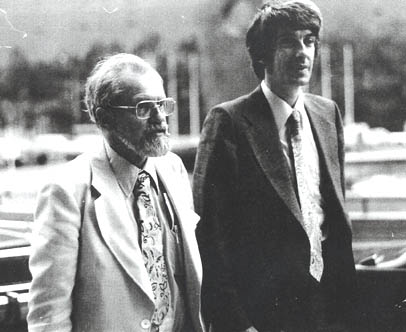
Vallée (right) with J. Allen Hynek

In 1963, Vallée relocated to Chicago, Illinois. He was initially employed as a systems analyst at nearby Northwestern University while continuing to pursue non-institutional ufological research with his mentor, J. Allen Hynek, the chair of the University's astronomy department. Professionally, he began to conduct early artificial intelligence research and received a PhD in industrial engineering and computer science from the institution in 1967. His doctoral advisor was Gilbert Krulee. Thereafter, he briefly worked for Royal Dutch Shell (in Paris) and the RCA Service Company (in Cherry Hill, New Jersey) as an engineer before joining the Stanford University Computer Center as manager of information systems in 1969. In 1970, Vallée became a consultant to Stanford applied physicist Peter A. Sturrock's Institute for Plasma Research. Upon learning that Vallée had written several books about UFOs, Sturrock felt a professional obligation to peruse Vallée's work, prompting his own research in the subject.

In 1971, Vallée left Stanford to join the Engelbart group as a senior research engineer. His tenure at ARC coincided with the group's immersion in Erhard Seminars Training and other social experiments, ultimately prompting his departure. While at the Institute for the Future as a senior research fellow from 1972 to 1976, he succeeded Paul Baran as principal investigator on the large National Science Foundation project for computer networking, which developed one of the first ARPANET conferencing systems, Planning Network (PLANET), predating instant messaging by many years. The technology was spun off into InfoMedia, a startup company founded by Vallée in 1976. Although the firm formed several international spinoffs and partnered with a variety of prominent firms and governmental organizations (including Lehman Brothers, Renault and NASA), it failed to attain long-term profitability.

Following its sale in 1983, Vallée entered the venture capital sphere as a partner at Sofinnova. From 1987 to 2010, he served as a general partner of several funds in Silicon Valley, most notably as the co-founder of the family of three Euro-America Ventures funds in North America and Europe. As a private investor, he continues to serve as executive manager of Documatica Financial, a San Francisco boutique focused on early-stage healthcare and technology startups. Among the companies for which he spearheaded early-stage financings, fourteen achieved initial public offerings, including Electronics for Imaging, Accuray (developers of the "CyberKnife" for cancer surgery), NeoPhotonics (developers of nanotechnology for optical networks), Mercury Interactive, P-Com, Isocor, Regeneration Technologies, Harmonic Lightwaves, Ixys, Integrated Packaging, E.Piphany, Sangstat Medical, Com21 and Synaptic Pharmaceuticals (which specialized in neurotransmitter biology). Other companies financed by Vallée (most notably HandyLab, which produced an instrument recognized as being "transformative for oncology") were successfully acquired by Becton-Dickinson, Intel, Lucent, AOL, Cisco, Wilson Greatbatch and Intuitive Surgical.

He has also served on the National Advisory Committee of the University of Michigan College of Engineering and authored four books on high technology, including Computer Message Systems, Electronic Meetings, The Network Revolution, and The Heart of the Internet.

== Paranormal research ==
According to Vallée, he sighted an unidentified flying object over his Pontoise home in May 1955. Six years later in 1961, while working on the staff of the French Space Committee, Vallée claims to have witnessed the destruction of the tracking tapes of an unknown object orbiting the Earth. The particular object was a retrograde satellite – that is, a satellite orbiting the Earth in the opposite direction to the Earth's rotation. At the time he observed this, there were no rockets powerful enough to launch such a satellite, so the team was quite excited as they assumed that the Earth's gravity had captured a natural satellite (asteroid). He claims that an unnamed superior came and erased the tape. These events contributed to Vallée's lifelong interest in the UFO phenomenon. Vallée began to correspond with Aimé Michel (who would become a key mentor and research collaborator) in 1958.

In the mid-1960s, like many other UFO researchers, Vallée initially attempted to validate the popular extraterrestrial hypothesis (or ETH).

However, by 1969, Vallée's conclusions had changed, and he publicly stated that the ETH was too narrow and ignored too much data. Vallée began exploring the commonalities between UFOs, cults, religious movements, demons, angels, ghosts, cryptid sightings, and psychic phenomena. His speculation about these potential links was first detailed in his third UFO book, Passport to Magonia: From Folklore to Flying Saucers.

As an alternative to the extraterrestrial visitation hypothesis, Vallée has suggested a multidimensional visitation hypothesis. This hypothesis represents an extension of the ETH where the alleged extraterrestrials could be potentially from anywhere. The entities could be multidimensional beyond space-time; thus they could coexist with humans, yet remain undetected.

Vallée's opposition to the popular ETH was not well received by prominent U.S. ufologists, hence he was viewed as something of an outcast. Indeed, Vallée refers to himself as a "heretic among heretics".

Vallée's opposition to the ETH theory is summarised in his paper, "Five Arguments Against the Extraterrestrial Origin of Unidentified Flying Objects", Journal of Scientific Exploration, 1990:

Scientific opinion has generally followed public opinion in the belief that unidentified flying objects either do not exist (the "natural phenomena hypothesis") or, if they do, must represent evidence of a visitation by some advanced race of space travellers (the extraterrestrial hypothesis or "ETH"). It is the view of the author that research on UFOs need not be restricted to these two alternatives. On the contrary, the accumulated data base exhibits several patterns tending to indicate that UFOs are real, represent a previously unrecognized phenomenon, and that the facts do not support the common concept of "space visitors". Five specific arguments articulated here contradict the ETH:

1. unexplained close encounters are far more numerous than required for any physical survey of the earth;
2. the humanoid body structure of the alleged "aliens" is not likely to have originated on another planet and is not biologically adapted to space travel;
3. the reported behavior in thousands of abduction reports contradicts the hypothesis of genetic or scientific experimentation on humans by an advanced race;
4. the extension of the phenomenon throughout recorded human history demonstrates that UFOs are not a contemporary phenomenon; and
5. the apparent ability of UFOs to manipulate space and time suggests radically different and richer alternatives.

Vallée's ideas about Miracle at Fatima and Marian apparitions are that they are a class of UFO encounters. Vallée is one of the first people to speculate publicly about the possibility that the "solar dance" at Fatima was a UFO. Vallée has also speculated that UFO activity may have caused other religious apparitions, including Our Lady of Lourdes and the revelations of Joseph Smith. Vallée believes that religious experiences such as these should be studied outside of their religious contexts.

Via professional association with SRI and independent friendships with Harold E. Puthoff and Central Intelligence Agency analyst Kit Green (who obtained a temporary security clearance for him in 1974), Vallée was intermittently consulted on classified remote viewing research (including the Stargate Project) throughout the 1970s and 1980s. During the early SRI experiments (led by Puthoff and Russell Targ in conjunction with Green as CIA contract monitor), he became acquainted with Uri Geller, Edgar Mitchell, Charles Musès, Andrija Puharich, Jack Sarfatti, Arthur M. Young, Edwin C. May, Pat Price and Ingo Swann. In 1973, Doubleday editor Bill Whitehead introduced Vallée to Ira Einhorn, a close confederate of Puharich; their association would span Vallée's business and paranormal networks until Einhorn was charged with murdering his ex-girlfriend in 1979. More recently, he has been associated with Robert Bigelow as a consultant to the National Institute for Discovery Science and a member of the scientific advisory board of Bigelow Aerospace.

In 2022, Vallée co-authored a peer-reviewed paper with Stanford pathology professor Garry Nolan in the journal Progress in Aerospace Sciences, examining modern mass spectrometry techniques for analyzing unidentified materials. The paper applied these methods to a sample connected to a 1977 incident in Council Bluffs, Iowa, comparing the results to earlier isotopic analysis of the same material.

== Archives of the Impossible ==
The Archives of the Impossible (AOTI) of Rice University at Houston, Texas is a special collection founded in 2014 by Jeffrey J. Kripal, a professor of religion. AOTI is based at the Woodson Research Center (WRC) and materials are housed in the Fondren Library. AOTI was initiated with a donation by Vallée of his collected lifetime research materials. Vallée initially asked Kripal in December 2014 if he could help locate a university archive to store his collections, due to worries about "potential loss or commercialization" of his research. After four years of negotiation, Vallée donated his collection to AOTI. Vallée formalized the accession process at Rice by holding a lecture of his research in 2018. In 2022, Wired reported that Vallée's collection in AOTI would include files on about 500 anomalous events that he investigated. Some Vallée materials in AOTI have embargoes until by his request, due to their "sensitive nature", according to the journal of the WLA. The Vallée release embargo extends to 2028-2031.

== In popular culture ==
=== Film appearances ===
In 1979, Robert Emenegger and Alan Sandler updated their 1974 UFOs: Past, Present, and Future documentary with new 1979 footage narrated by Jacques Vallée. The updated version is entitled UFOs: It Has Begun.

Vallée served as the real-life model for Claude Lacombe, the researcher portrayed by François Truffaut in Steven Spielberg's 1977 film Close Encounters of the Third Kind. He also attempted to interest Spielberg in an alternative explanation for the phenomenon. In an interview on Conspire.com, Vallée said, "I argued with him that the subject was even more interesting if it wasn't extraterrestrials. If it was real, physical, but not ET. So he said, 'You're probably right, but that's not what the public is expecting — this is Hollywood and I want to give people something that's close to what they expect.'"

==== Filmography ====
- UFOs: It Has Begun (1979)
- Witness of Another World (2018)
- The Phenomenon (2020)

=== X-Files ===
Episode "Jose Chung's From Outer Space" of X-Files, which aired on April 12, 1996, had fake alien pilots named Jacques Sheaffer and Robert Vallee. According to Robert Sheaffer this was a joke by the X-Files creator Chris Carter to name the characters after Vallee and Sheaffer. Sheaffer further states that "the M.P. who later arrested them [the characters] was Sgt. Hynek", a reference to ufologist J. Allen Hynek.

== Personal life ==
Vallée was married to Janine Saley from 1960 until her death in 2010. They have two children, Olivier and Catherine.

== Publications ==
=== Journal articles ===
- "An Automatic Question-answering System for Stellar Astronomy," with J. Allen Hynek. Publications of the Astronomical Society of the Pacific, vol. 78, no. 463 (August 1966): 315–323. ISSN 0004-6280. JSTOR 40674368.
- Vallée, Jacques Fabrice (1967). "UFO Consensus". Science. 158 (3806): 1266. doi:10.1126/science.158.3806.1266.a. JSTOR 1722714. PMID 17801847. Wikidata Q110652743. Richard J. Rosa, William T. Powers, Thomas R. P. Gibb, Jr., Philip C. Steffey, Isabel R. A. García, and George Cohen also had letters.
- "Group Communication Through Electronic Media: Fundamental Choices and Social Effects," with Robert Johansen and Richard H. Miller. Educational Technology, vol. 14, no. 8 (August 1974): 7–20. ISSN 0013-1962. JSTOR 44420906.
- Vallée, Jacques Fabrice; Hubert Lipinski; Robert Johansen; Thaddeus Wilson (1975). "Computer conferencing". Science. 188 (4185): 203. doi:10.1126/science.188.4185.203.b. JSTOR 1739909. PMID 17800381. Wikidata Q81085856.
- "Remote Viewing and Computer Communications: An Experiment." Journal of Scientific Exploration, vol. 2, no. 1 (1988) pp. 13–27. ISSN 0892-3310.
- "Five Arguments Against the Extraterrestrial Origin of Unidentified Flying Objects." Journal of Scientific Exploration, vol. 4, no. 1 (1990): 105–117. ISSN 0892-3310. archived

"Presented at the Eighth Annual Conference of the Society for Scientific Exploration, Boulder, Colorado, June 1989."

- "Estimates of Optical Power Output in Six Cases of Unexplained Aerial Objects with Defined Luminosity Characteristics." Journal of Scientific Exploration, vol. 12, no. 3 (1998) pp. 345–358. ISSN 0892-3310.
- "Physical Analyses in Ten Cases of Unexplained Aerial Objects with Material Samples." Journal of Scientific Exploration, vol. 12, no. 3 (1998) pp. 359–375. ISSN 0892-3310.
- "Six Cases of Unexplained Aerial Objects with Defined Luminosity Characteristics." Journal of Scientific Exploration, vol. 12, no. 3 (Autumn 1998) pp. 345–358. ISSN 0892-3310.
- "Improved instrumental techniques, including isotopic analysis, applicable to the characterization of unusual materials with potential relevance to aerospace forensics," with Garry P. Nolan, Sizun Jiang, Larry G. Lemke. Progress in Aerospace Sciences, vol. 128 (Jan. 2022). doi:10.1016/j.paerosci.2021.100788. ISSN 0376-0421.

=== Books ===
Finance

- The Four Elements of Financial Alchemy: A New Formula for Personal Prosperity. Berkeley: Ten Speed Press (2000). ISBN 978-1580082181. OCLC 44681865.

Novels

- Fastwalker, with Tracy Tormé. Berkeley: Publ. Frog Ltd. (June 1996). ISBN 1883319439.
- Stratagème (in French). (January 2006). ISBN 2841877779.
  - English: Stratagem (July 2007). ISBN 978-0615156422.

Science Fiction

- Le Sub-Espace [Sub-Space] (as Jérôme Sériel). Sub-Space (1961)
- Le Satellite Sombre [The Dark Satellite] (as Jérôme Sériel). (1963)
- Alintel (1986)

Provided partial basis for Fastwalker.

- La Mémoire de Markov (1986)

Technical

- Computer Message Systems. Data Communications Book Series. New York: McGraw-Hill (August 1984). ISBN 0070510318.
- Electronic Meetings: Technical Alternatives. Addison-Wesley Series on Decision Support. Addison-Wesley Publishing (July 1979). ISBN 0201034786.
- The Network Revolution: Confessions of a Computer Scientist. Berkeley: And/Or Press (1982). ISBN 0140071172.
- The Heart of the Internet: An Insider's View of the Origin and Promise of the On-line Revolution. Charlottesville, VA: Hampton Roads Pub. Co. (2003). ISBN 978-1571743695.

UFOlogy

- Anatomy of a Phenomenon: Unidentified Objects in Space – a Scientific Appraisal. NTC/Contemporary Publishing (January 1965). ISBN 0809298880.
  - Reissue: UFO's In Space: Anatomy of A Phenomenon (paperback). Ballantine Books (April 1987). ISBN 0345344375.
- Challenge to Science: The UFO Enigma – with Janine Vallée (NTC/Contemporary Publishing, 1966)
- Vallée, Jacques Fabrice (1969), Passport to Magonia: from Folklore to Flying Saucers, Wikidata Q35273897
- Vallée, Jacques Fabrice (1975), The Invisible College: What a Group of Scientists Has Discovered about UFO Influence on the Human Race, Wikidata Q2983594
- The Edge of Reality: A Progress Report on Unidentified Flying Objects – Jacques Vallée and Dr. J. Allen Hynek (Quality Books, 1975)
- Vallée, Jacques Fabrice (June 1979), Messengers of Deception: UFO Contacts and Cults, Wikidata Q40014992
- Vallée, Jacques Fabrice (April 1988), Dimensions: A Casebook of Alien Contact (in English and French), OL 2298953W, Wikidata Q40201814
- Vallée, Jacques Fabrice (March 1990), Confrontations: A Scientist's Search for Alien Contact, Wikidata Q19422803
- Vallée, Jacques Fabrice (September 1991), Revelations: Alien Contact and Human Deception, Wikidata Q40206753
- UFO Chronicles of the Soviet Union: A Cosmic Samizdat (Ballantine Books, 1992)
- Wonders in the Sky: Unexplained Aerial Objects from Antiquity to Modern Times (paperback ed.). Tarcher. 2010. ISBN 978-1-58542-820-5.
- TRINITY: The Best-Kept Secret (Documatica Research, 2021; ISBN 979-8745902567)
- Forbidden Science: The Journals of Jacques Vallee. 2026.
1. Volume 1: 1957-1969. North Atlantic Books. 1992.
2. Volume 2: California Hermetica, 1970-1979. San Francisco: Documatica Research. 2009.
3. Volume 3: On the Trail of Hidden Truths, 1980-1989. Lulu Press. 2016.
4. Volume 4: The Spring Hill Chronicles, 1990-1999. Lulu Press. 2019.
5. Volume 5: Pacific Heights, 2000-2009. Anomalist Books. 2023.
6. Volume 6: Scattered Castles, 2010-2019. Anomalist Books. 2025.
7. Volume 7: Final Report, 2020-2025. Anomalist Books. 2026.

=== Reports ===
- Group Communication Through Computers, Vol. 1: Design and Use of the FORUM System, with Hubert M. Lipinski and Richard H. Miller. Menlo Park, Calif.: Institute for the Future (July 1974).

"Supported by National Science Foundation Grant GJ-35 326X and Advanced Resesrch Projects Agency Contract No. DAHC 15 72 C 0165."

=== Other materials ===
- Report from the Field: Scientific Issues in the UFO Phenomenon (presentation). George Washington University (November 8, 2002).
- "Crop Circles: 'Signs' From Above or Human Artifacts? Some personal speculations on a fractal theme." ufocasebook.com.
- "Are UFO Events related to Sidereal Time? Arguments against a proposed correlation." jacquesvallee.com.

== See also ==
- Magonia (mythology)
