= James Fox (filmmaker) =

English-born American filmmaker (born 1968)

James C. Fox
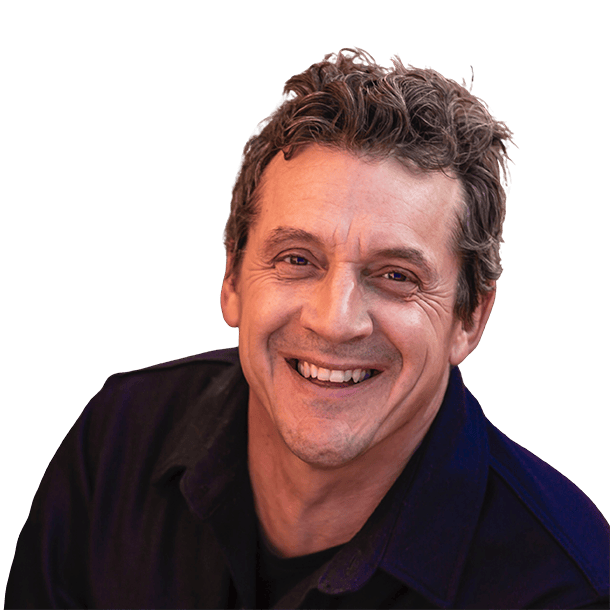
- James C. Fox (documentary filmmaker)
- Born: April 25, 1968 (age 57)
- Occupation: Documentary filmmaker
- Website: x.com/jamescfox

James C. Fox (born 25 April 1968) is an English-born American documentary filmmaker, best known for executive producing documentaries about UFOs, such as Out of the Blue (2003), Pretty Slick (2016) about the Deepwater Horizon oil spill, The Phenomenon (2020), and Moment of Contact about the Varginha UFO incident. He has appeared on The Joe Rogan Experience three times, first in December 2020 alongside Jacques Vallée, second by himself in April 2023, and third by himself in December 2024.

== Filmography ==
Year	Title	Role	Notes
1997	UFOs: 50 Years of Denial?	Executive producer, writer, and director	
2003	Out of the Blue	Executive producer, writer, and director	Narrated by Peter Coyote
2009	I Know What I Saw	Executive producer, writer, and director	
2016	Pretty Slick	Executive producer and director	Narrated by Peter Coyote
2020	The Phenomenon	Executive producer, writer, and director	Narrated by Peter Coyote
2022	Moment of Contact	Executive producer and director	Narrated by Peter Coyote
2024	The Program	Executive producer, writer, and director	Narrated by Peter Coyote
2025	Moment of Contact: New Revelations of Alien Encounters	Writer, and director	
