= Houston Asian American Archive =

Coordinates: 29.7169°N 95.4027°W

The Houston Asian American Archive (HAAA) is a faculty-led, student-run archive with both digital and physical presence at Rice University, for the sole purpose of scholarship. The Archive consists primarily of its oral history collection of over 300 interviews; in addition, it also runs programs such as exhibitions which showcase the archival materials, interactive and creative community projects, podcasts, panel discussions and other events surrounding the topics of Asian and Asian American experiences. The Archive is managed by the Chao Center for Asian Studies at Rice University.

The HAAA archives history, inclusive of lived and living experiences of Pan-Asian, from East, to South, to Southwest and South Asians. In addition to conducting oral histories, the archive also collects memorabilia such as photographs, newspapers, journals, business records as well as recipes and artworks. These artifacts are stored in the Woodson Research Center at Fondren Library.

== People ==
The Archive is managed by Dr. Anne S. Chao, Co-Founder of the project, and Adjunct Faculty at the Humanities Department, Rice University. Chao says:

We have now gathered 300 stories. And I would say every single story is just mind bogglingly courageous. The people are full of dignity. And despite the setbacks, many of them actually are very reluctant to talk about any kind of discrimination is suffered, when clearly these 80, 90-year-olds grew up under Jim Crow, a worse and yet they did not want to talk about it.

— Anne Chao on Podcast "Chinatown 2.0" hosted by Richard Yan (September 2020).

Each semester, ten to twenty Rice student interns join the HAAA internship program to receive oral history techniques training, conduct and transcribe interviews, as well as research and write on the materials they collect through this method of history studies, some of which are submitted for a Chao Center's student-run publication Rice Asian Studies Review (RASR). Podcast "Dear Houston—Love, Asian America," started in spring 2021, is another student-run project started and produced by Ann Shi (Associate Curator) under guidance from faculty, local community leaders, as well as established professionals in various industries including filmmakers, writers, artists and musicians.

The Chao Center for Asian Studies also incorporate studies and courses of the Houston Asian community and contemporary Asia in a global context. For example, in "ASIA 305: Ethnographic Research In/Of Houston Asian," taught by Ka-Kin Cheuk in fall 2020, students actively conduct interviews of the local Asian community, one of which includes the Sikh temple, a Zoroastrian temple and a Buddhist temple within the Houston community for ethnographic field work. The Archive served as an integral primary source for the teaching of this course.

"It is not just about how we write ethnography about them," Cheuk said, "but also that we give the Asian-American communities an opportunity to see how students study at Rice." -- Dr. Ka-Kin Cheuk

== Collection ==
The Archive consists of over 500 published digital oral histories, with a portion of the oral histories in physical format only at the Woodson Research Center, where it also preserves an ongoing collection of memorabilia and artifacts donated by participants to the Archive. Interested in documenting the histories of specific communities and organizations, the Archive also runs various categories of oral histories collections. These include a collection on the Chinese Baptist Church, Sri Meenakshi Temple, Asian scientists in Houston; and Special Collections on COVID-19 ("COVID Chronicles" Collection), and Civic Engagement and Empowerment .

HAAA continues to expand its oral history and memorabilia collections, and welcomes Asian and Asian American communities to reach out if they are or they know of someone who is interested in documenting their oral history with HAAA.

== Awards ==
In 2023, HAAA was given a grant by the Robert H. N. Ho Foundation to initiate an art x music residency program, with its inaugural artist-in-residency Liu Xin.

In 2022, HAAA was awarded USD 250,000 by the Houston Endowment for the Arts.

In 2021, HAAA was awarded the Excellence Award by Texas Digital Library.

In 2018, HAAA was the recipient of the Phi Beta Kappa society Award for Innovative Efforts to Build Community Connections through the Humanities.

In 2017, HAAA was the recipient of the Resilient Networks to Support Inclusive Digital Humanities jump-start grant from the Andrew W. Mellon Foundation.

== See also ==
- Asian Americans in Houston
- History of the Chinese Americans in Houston
- History of Vietnamese Americans in Houston
