= The Phenomenon (film) =

2020 documentary film about UFOs

- Official release poster
- Directed by: James Fox
- Written by: Marc Barasch; James Fox
- Produced by: James Fox; Dan Farah; Donald R. Schmitt; Rex Steven Sikes
- Narrated by: Peter Coyote
- Cinematography: David E. West
- Music by: Christopher Hoag
- Production company: CE3
- Distributed by: 1091 Media
- Release date: October 6, 2020
- Country: United States
- Language: English

The Phenomenon is a 2020 documentary film written and produced by ufologist James Fox.

== Premise ==
The Phenomenon covers the (then) recently released Pentagon UFO videos, but its primary focus is the history of UFO sightings in the time since World War II, and it makes a case for greater scientific study of "the UFO phenomenon".

The film includes footage or archival interviews with Kenneth Arnold, who coined the phrase "flying saucer" after his 1947 sighting; Maj. Jesse Marcel of the Roswell incident; ufologist Jacques Vallee, whose research uncovered the "Pentacle Memorandum"; witnesses to the Ariel School, the Westall UFO, the Lonnie Zamora incident, and the Rendlesham Forest incidents; and military personnel and other individuals connected with the Pentagon UFO videos. It also features interviews with former US Senate majority leader Harry Reid, Clinton White House chief of staff John Podesta, former deputy undersecretary for Defense Intelligence Christopher Mellon, former New Mexico governor Bill Richardson, and journalist Leslie Kean. In the film, Reid is asked about other evidence and replies "I'm saying most of it hasn't seen the light of day."

== Release ==
The film was released on 6 October 2020, and was promoted as being "the most credible and revealing film ever made about the long-standing global cover-up and mystery involving unidentified aerial phenomenon." It is James Fox's fourth film on the subject of UFOs, the first three being UFOs: 50 Years of Denial? (1997), I Know What I Saw (2009) and Out of the Blue (2003). It is narrated by veteran PBS narrator Peter Coyote.

== Reception ==
Tom Rogan, the national security writer and online editor of the Washington Examiner said that the primary focus of the film is the broad, post-World War II history of this subject. He reported that the "documentary is bold but necessarily grounded. The vast majority of witnesses... either come from military backgrounds, have held high security clearance positions in government, or the defense sector." Rogan concludes that "there is no question that there are charlatans in this field. It's also absolutely true that most UFOs can be explained by weather conditions or misidentified observations of conventional aircraft. It's also true that we know far less about what's going on with the rare UFOs than what we do know. But this is a subject that demands, and within government is now getting, serious attention."

Writing for Movie Geeks, Marc Butterfield said "If you aren’t disturbed after you watch this documentary, you weren’t paying attention." Butterfield concludes that "while we now know that they (whoever 'they' are) are out there, we still have no idea what they want, where they're from, what they are doing here at all. There is the one thing that this documentary can say that it does: removes doubt. There can be no further discussion about 'if' they are out there. We now know that they do, beyond the shadow of a doubt. If you only see one documentary this year, The Phenomenon movie is the one."

Brian Lowry of CNN wrote that the film is "an earnest documentary most notable for the former officials that lend credence to the notion the government knows much more than it has shared, and that the truth, well, is out there." Lowry concludes "If you're intrigued by the topic at all – and who isn’t? – this documentary might be a little too breathless, but it usefully updates the conversation through the flurry of activity over the last few years."

Nick Johnston of Vanyaland wrote that the documentary "is a surprisingly compelling watch that takes full advantage of the new and fascinating revelations about true Unidentified Flying Objects and the government's long history of denial and, ultimately its recent disclosure that, yes, these things exist and, no, we don't have a single clue what they are."

Ed Conroy of the San Antonio Express-News reported that "Taken together, the people interviewed in the documentary make a case for greater scientific study of the UFO phenomenon, for greater public understanding of it, and for an end to official secrecy." He also wrote that the film's director Fox said "Our intention in making this documentary was to create the seminal feature that would treat this subject in the manner it deserves with great intellectual integrity, and in doing so transcend the UFO community and reach a much broader audience".

Adrian Horton of The Guardian wrote "The Phenomenon, like the many extraterrestrial documentaries before it, ultimately can’t stake a claim on certainty; instead, it concludes with a call for consideration."

Hannah Tran of Film Festival Today wrote "while not every bit of information proves to be as interesting as the next, there are a number of truly tremendous stories strategically sprinkled throughout that continue to keep interest high... In its final moments, The Phenomenon’s ability to not merely present information but also meditate on its meaning shines through and elevates the film to a new level. Not only does it contextualize its abundance of information, but it connects it directly to the fears and anxieties of the modern viewer that will linger long after watching."

== See also ==
- Advanced Aerospace Threat Identification Program
