= Pacific Northwest Library Association =

American professional association

- Nickname: PNLA
- Formation: June 10, 1909; 116 years ago
- Founded at: Seattle, Washington
- Headquarters: Bothell, Washington
- President: Pam Henley
- Vice President: Nicole Thode
- Second Vice President: Ilana Kingsley
- Parent organization: American Library Association
- Website: pnla.org

The Pacific Northwest Library Association (PNLA) is a professional organization for the Pacific Northwest's librarians and library workers headquartered in Bothell, Washington. It has over 200 members from Alaska, Alberta, British Columbia, Idaho, Montana, Oregon and Washington.

== History ==
PNLA was formed in 1909 as the Alaska–Yukon–Pacific Exposition was occurring. It was sponsored by the Washington Library Association and was formed by thirty-five librarians from Washington, Oregon, and British Columbia who met at the University of Washington to create an organization to overcome the "geographic isolation" which separated libraries in the Pacific Northwest from other libraries in the eastern and central parts of the United States. Some of the early initiatives of PNLA included advocating for library legislation in Alaska and the Yukon, as well as formation of the Subscription Book Committee which published Subscription Books Bulletin.

== Publications and awards ==
Subscription Books Bulletin notified libraries of low-quality books available via subscription. The newsletter was eventually taken over by the American Library Association and merged into ALA Booklist. PNLA has been publishing PNLA Quarterly since 1936. In 1972 PNLA published Index of Pacific Northwest Portraits, an index to the illustrations of 12,000 men and women with historical importance in the states of Alaska, British Columbia, Idaho, Montana, Oregon and Washington, which appear in over 350 publications.

PNLA has been giving out the Young Reader's Choice Award since 1940. It is the oldest children's choice award in the US and Canada, and the only regional award chosen by children of both countries.

== State and Provincial Library Associations within the Pacific Northwest ==
- Alaska Library Association
- British Columbia Library Association
- Idaho Library Association
- Library Association of Alberta
- Montana Library Association
- Oregon Library Association
- Washington Library Association

== See also ==
- List of libraries in the United States
