= Christopher Hoag =

Christopher Hoag is a composer best known for his original work on House and the documentary feature The Phenomenon. He began composing professionally while he was still in high school and has continued since, scoring a variety of projects in film, television, and theater. In 2005 he received an Emmy nomination for Outstanding Music Composition for a Series (Dramatic Underscore) for his score for the pilot episode of House. In 2017 he received the award for Best Original Score for the short film Résilience at The Creation International Film Festival.

He is also known for his contribution as the composer for The House at Haunted Hill, a well-known annual Halloween attraction in Woodland Hills, California, as well as his work composing and performing the complete soundtrack for the video game Concursion, in which every piece is arranged in five distinct styles running in parallel, which are then played together, remixed, and balanced in real time.
