= Altoona, Kansas =

City in Wilson County, Kansas, United States

- City
- Location within Wilson County and Kansas

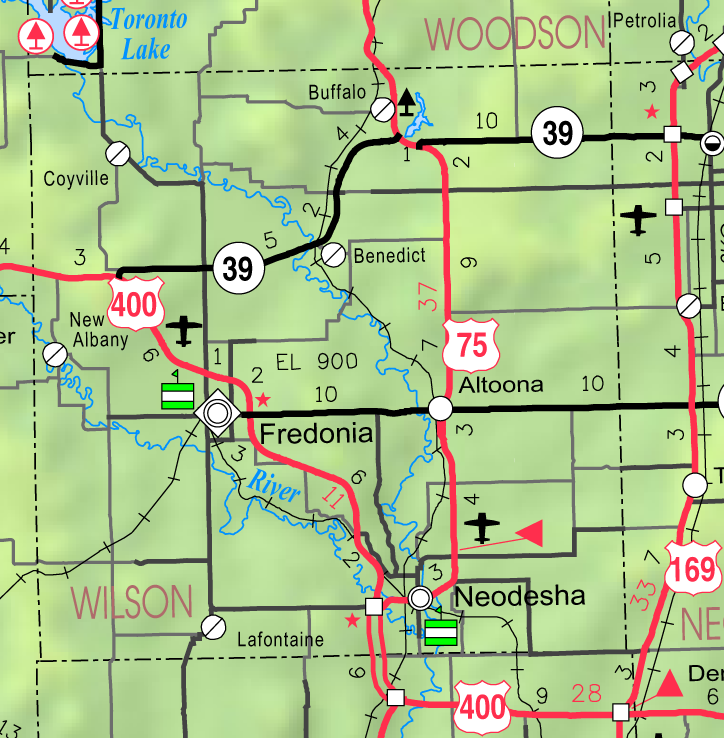
- KDOT map of Wilson County (legend)
- Coordinates: 37°31′36″N 95°39′43″W
- Country: United States
- State: Kansas
- County: Wilson
- Founded: 1869
- Incorporated: 1887
- Named for: Altoona, Pennsylvania

Area
  - Total: 0.54 sq mi (1.39 km^{2})
  - Land: 0.53 sq mi (1.38 km^{2})
  - Water: 0.0039 sq mi (0.01 km^{2})
- Elevation: 827 ft (252 m)

Population (2020)
  - Total: 354
  - Density: 664/sq mi (257/km^{2})
- Time zone: UTC-6 (CST)
  - Summer (DST): UTC-5 (CDT)
- ZIP Code: 66710
- Area code: 620
- FIPS code: 20-01625
- GNIS ID: 475090

Altoona is a city in Wilson County, Kansas, United States, along the Verdigris River. As of the 2020 census, the population of the city was 354.

== History ==
Altoona was originally called Geddesburg when it was founded in 1869. It was renamed Altoona in 1870, after Altoona, Pennsylvania. The first post office in Altoona was established in April 1870.

Altoona experienced growth when the railroad was built through the settlement about 1885.

As of 1916, Altoona was a sundown town, where African Americans were not allowed to live.

== Geography ==
Altoona is located at 37°31′36″N 95°39′43″W (37.526796, -95.661903). According to the United States Census Bureau, the city has a total area of 0.55 square miles (1.42 km^{2}), all land.

== Demographics ==
Historical population
Census	Pop.	Note	%±
1890	265		—
1900	299		12.8%
1910	1,462		389.0%
1920	1,016		−30.5%
1930	839		−17.4%
1940	707		−15.7%
1950	482		−31.8%
1960	490		1.7%
1970	475		−3.1%
1980	564		18.7%
1990	456		−19.1%
2000	485		6.4%
2010	414		−14.6%
2020	354		−14.5%
U.S. Decennial Census

=== 2020 census ===
The 2020 United States census counted 354 people, 140 households, and 84 families in Altoona. The population density was 662.9 per square mile (256.0/km^{2}). There were 182 housing units at an average density of 340.8 per square mile (131.6/km^{2}). The racial makeup was 89.83% (318) white or European American (89.83% non-Hispanic white), 0.28% (1) black or African-American, 1.13% (4) Native American or Alaska Native, 0.28% (1) Asian, 0.28% (1) Pacific Islander or Native Hawaiian, 0.28% (1) from other races, and 7.91% (28) from two or more races. Hispanic or Latino of any race was 1.13% (4) of the population.

Of the 140 households, 30.0% had children under the age of 18; 44.3% were married couples living together; 28.6% had a female householder with no spouse or partner present. 35.0% of households consisted of individuals and 13.6% had someone living alone who was 65 years of age or older. The average household size was 2.1 and the average family size was 2.8. The percent of those with a bachelor's degree or higher was estimated to be 5.4% of the population.

26.8% of the population was under the age of 18, 7.1% from 18 to 24, 23.7% from 25 to 44, 22.0% from 45 to 64, and 20.3% who were 65 years of age or older. The median age was 40.2 years. For every 100 females, there were 103.4 males. For every 100 females ages 18 and older, there were 103.9 males.

The 2016–2020 5-year American Community Survey estimates show that the median household income was $24,688 (with a margin of error of +/- $6,901) and the median family income was $37,500 (+/- $16,516). The median income for those above 16 years old was $18,889 (+/- $7,179). Approximately, 28.4% of families and 29.7% of the population were below the poverty line, including 37.5% of those under the age of 18 and 15.1% of those ages 65 or over.

=== 2010 census ===
As of the census of 2010, there were 414 people, 165 households, and 111 families residing in the city. The population density was 752.7 inhabitants per square mile (290.6/km^{2}). There were 194 housing units at an average density of 352.7 per square mile (136.2/km^{2}). The racial makeup of the city was 95.2% White, 1.2% Native American, and 3.6% from two or more races. Hispanic or Latino of any race were 2.9% of the population.

There were 165 households, of which 32.7% had children under the age of 18 living with them, 44.8% were married couples living together, 16.4% had a female householder with no husband present, 6.1% had a male householder with no wife present, and 32.7% were non-families. 27.9% of all households were made up of individuals, and 9.7% had someone living alone who was 65 years of age or older. The average household size was 2.51 and the average family size was 2.98.

The median age in the city was 37.6 years. 27.5% of residents were under the age of 18; 6.4% were between the ages of 18 and 24; 23.9% were from 25 to 44; 27% were from 45 to 64; and 15.2% were 65 years of age or older. The gender makeup of the city was 47.3% male and 52.7% female.

=== 2000 census ===
As of the census of 2000, there were 485 people, 201 households, and 133 families residing in the city. The population density was 891.5 inhabitants per square mile (344.2/km^{2}). There were 232 housing units at an average density of 426.5 per square mile (164.7/km^{2}). The racial makeup of the city was 97.73% White, 1.24% Native American, 0.21% from other races, and 0.82% from two or more races. Hispanic or Latino of any race were 0.41% of the population.

There were 201 households, out of which 31.8% had children under the age of 18 living with them, 47.8% were married couples living together, 13.4% had a female householder with no husband present, and 33.8% were non-families. 32.8% of all households were made up of individuals, and 18.4% had someone living alone who was 65 years of age or older. The average household size was 2.41 and the average family size was 2.99.

In the city, the population was spread out, with 29.5% under the age of 18, 6.4% from 18 to 24, 24.3% from 25 to 44, 23.1% from 45 to 64, and 16.7% who were 65 years of age or older. The median age was 38 years. For every 100 females, there were 90.2 males. For every 100 females age 18 and over, there were 86.9 males.

The median income for a household in the city was $23,906, and the median income for a family was $30,375. Males had a median income of $28,523 versus $22,500 for females. The per capita income for the city was $12,534. About 9.9% of families and 16.3% of the population were below the poverty line, including 21.2% of those under age 18 and 10.1% of those age 65 or over.

== Education ==
The community is served by Altoona–Midway USD 387 public school district.

== Notable people ==
- Tom Hamilton, baseball player
- Oren Long, former governor and senator from Hawaii
- Ida Moore, actress
- Benjamin Woodson, insurance executive

== See also ==
- List of sundown towns in the United States
