= Asian Americans in Houston =

Ethnic group in Houston

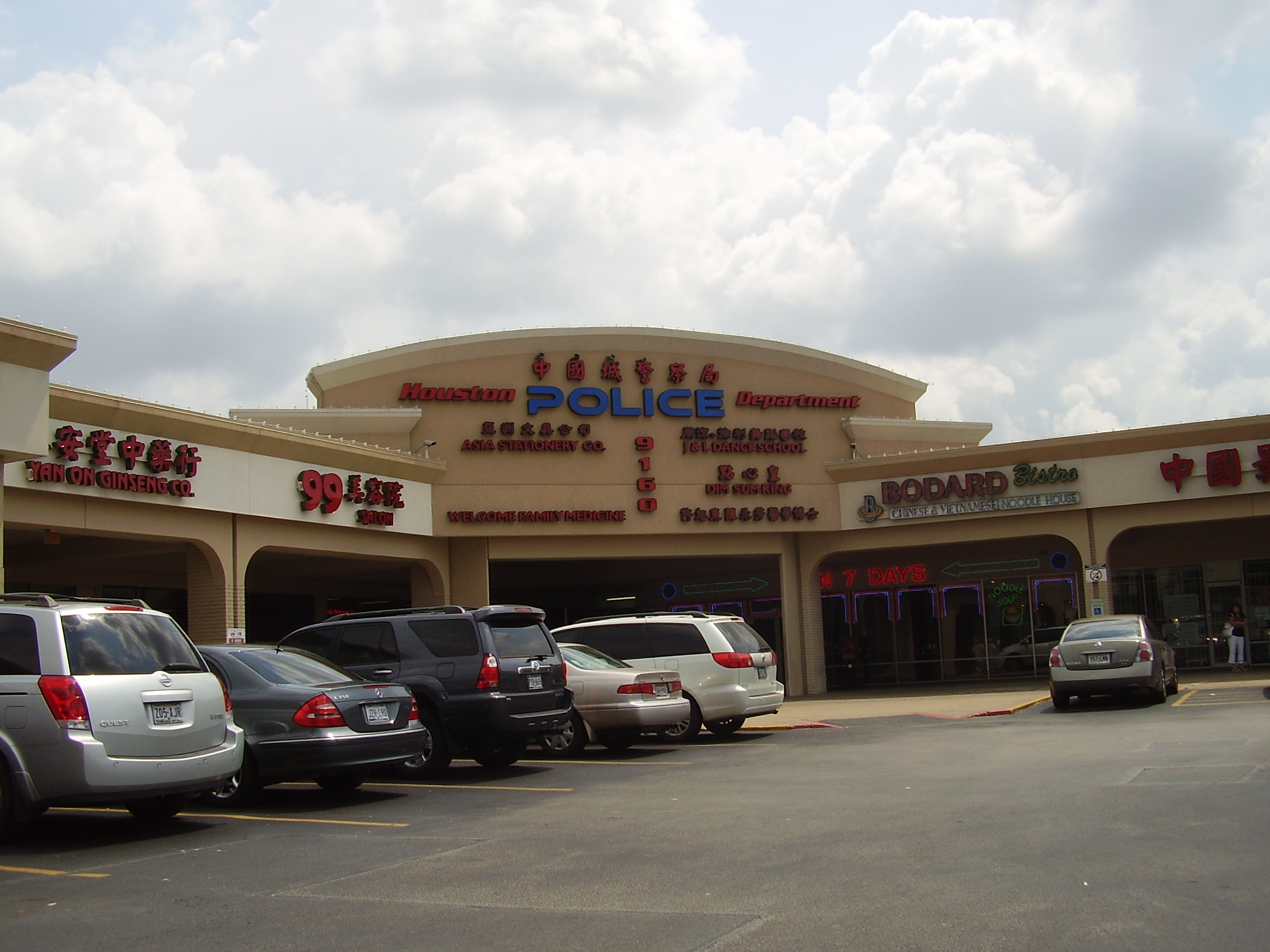
Ranchester Police Storefront in Chinatown - The Chinese name is the Chinatown Police Station (中國城警察局 Zhōngguóchéng Jǐngchájú)

Houston has large populations of immigrants from Asia. The city has the largest Vietnamese American population in Texas and second-largest in the United States as of 2019. Furthermore, Houston also has one of the largest Chinese American, Pakistani American, and Filipino American populations in the United States. Currently, the Asian American population in Houston is estimated to be 650,000 people.

== History ==
The 1877 Houston City Directory listed three ethnic Chinese people who worked in laundries, and the 1880 United States census listed seven Chinese people living in the city. In 1910, 30 Asians lived in Houston; 20 were Japanese and 10 were Chinese. Even though at the time, the population of Asian Americans was very small, the population went unacknowledged until recently despite playing a part in enhancing Houston's development as a leading city.

In the era of de jure racial segregation in the United States, authorities in Texas classified people of Asian origins as "White." This allowed people of Asian ancestry to get superior educational opportunities.

Chinese people were the only ethnic group with a significant settlement pattern in Houston until the 1970s. The lack of Asian immigration in Greater Houston was due to historical restrictions on Asian Americans. According to the 1980 U.S. census, 484 Chinese immigrants living in the area had lived there prior to 1950. Among 12 Asian ethnic groups other than Chinese listed by the census for the Houston area, fewer than 100 immigrants had settled before 1950. The 1965 Immigration Act, which ended the restrictions, allowed an increase in Chinese Americans. The number increased to 121 by the start of World War II. During the war, many Chinese people from southern states migrated to take advantage of the economy, and the population increased by more than twice its size.

Albert Gee, the head of the Houston Restaurant Association and an Asian American, helped African American community leaders negotiate a voluntary desegregation during the Civil Rights Movement.

Large-scale Asian immigration to Houston began in the 1970s. By 1980, 48,000 Asians lived in Greater Houston. Asian immigration increased in the 1980s. This increase was facilitated by many migration waves, such as professionals coming to the U.S. following the 1965 Immigration Act and refugee relocation after the Vietnam War. Edward C. M. Chen and Debbie Harwell, authors of "Asian Americans: Expanding Our Horizons," wrote that U.S. Censuses prior to 1980 lacked the ability to accurately track Asian American populations.

By 1990, 90,000 Asian immigrants lived in Harris County and 48,000 Asians lived in Greater Houston. As of 1990, the largest two Asian immigrant groups to Houston were Chinese and Vietnamese people, making up 46% of all Asian immigrants, with 15,568 Vietnamese and 10,817 Chinese from China, Hong Kong, and Taiwan. However, Asian immigration increasingly diversified. The remainder of Asian immigrants in 1990 comprised 7,044 Indians, 4,807 Filipinos, 3,249 Koreans, 2,419 Iranians, 2,411 Pakistanis, 1,950 Japanese and 1,146 Cambodians. This growing population made Houston one of the most multicultural cities in the United States. In the 1990s, Asian immigration rates exceeded those of Hispanics. A 1997 U.S. Census survey said there were 202,685 Asians combined in Harris County and Fort Bend County. In 1998, Betty Ann Bowser, a reporter for PBS Newshour, said that many Southeast Asians came to Houston because "its hot humid climate reminded them of home." Houston has a similar climate to that of Vietnam, Taiwan, Hong Kong, and the Philippines.

According to a 2002 survey of 500 Asian Americans in Harris County overseen by Stephen Klineberg, a professor at Rice University, Asian immigrants have substantially lower household income than Anglo residents and other immigrant groups, while they have higher levels of education.

In 2007 Houston had 16,000 Asian American businesses. A 2006 U.S. Census Bureau report stated that the annual revenues of those businesses totaled to $5.5 billion ($8783839551.01 in today's money).

By 2010 the number of Asian-Americans in Greater Houston was over 417,000. In 2010 John B. Strait and Gang Gong, authors of the article "Ethnic Diversity in Houston, Texas: The Evolution of Residential Segregation in the Bayou City, 1990–2000," stated that Asians were "only modestly segregated from" non-Hispanic whites.

== Demographics ==
The Asian American community has expanded hugely over the years. Looking at research from Rice University's Kinder Institute, Asian Americans have become one of the quickest expanding groups in Houston, rising from 1.8% of the population in 1980 all the way to 10% in 2020.

The population is wide-ranging, with Asian Indians currently taking the lead for the biggest ethnic group, then Vietnamese and Chinese groups. Yet, these groups all have their own stories surrounding migration, different social class and economic status, and community layout through the United States.

In general, level of education for Asian Americans in Houston is high especially in industries such as engineering, technology and medicine but result different across the different groups with some groups having lower income levels compared to others. Furthermore, a huge percent of the population are nonnative meaning that in Houston there is language multiplicity with many Asian language continued to be spoken at homes and Asian stores/communities.

== Ethnic groups ==
=== Vietnamese ===
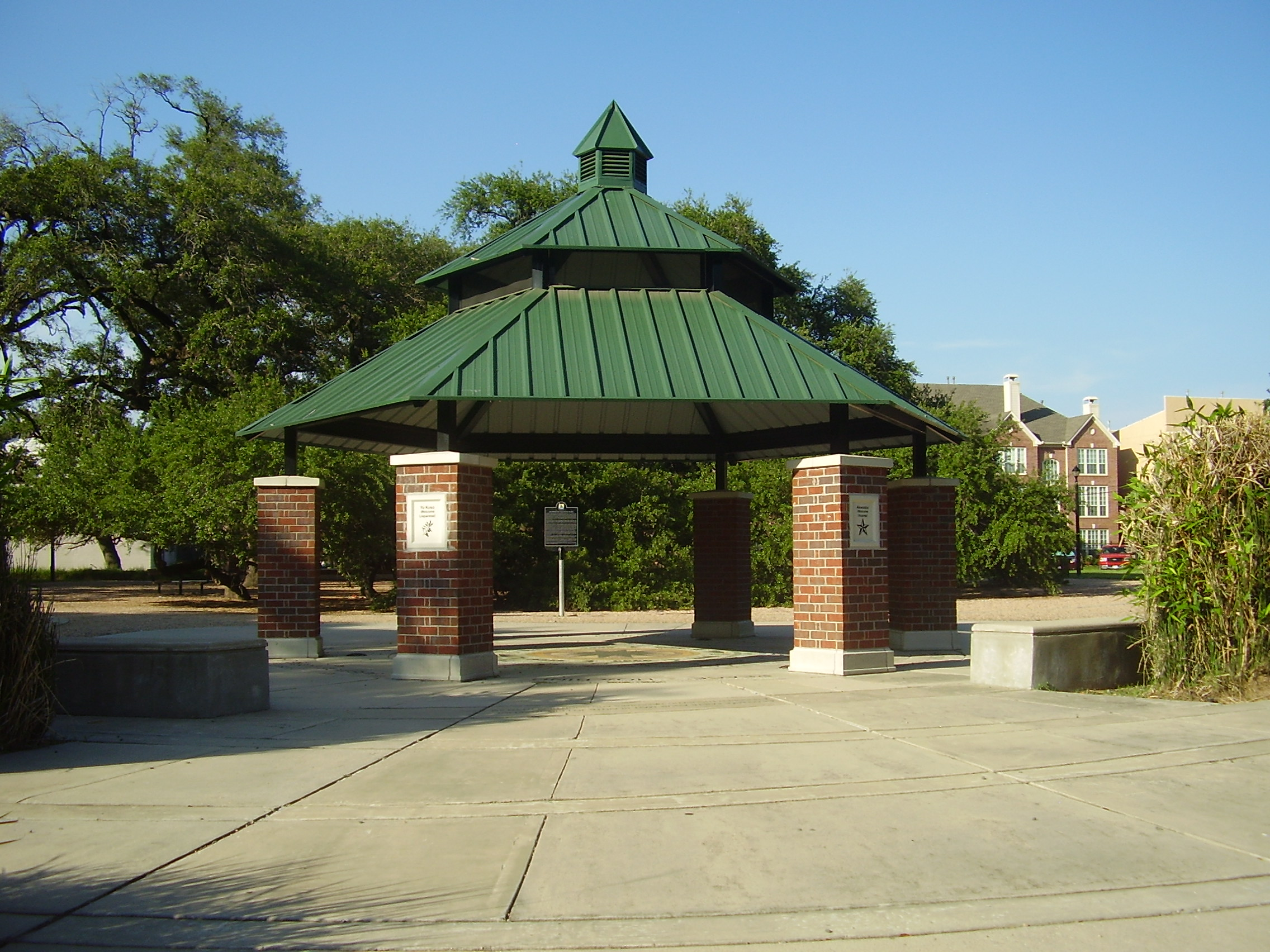
Vietnamese culture memorial at Baldwin Park in Midtown

In 2010, Harris County had 80,000 Vietnamese (2% of county) and Vietnamese Americans, making it the second largest Vietnamese American community in the United States after that of San Jose, California.

There were three main waves of Vietnamese immigration to Houston. The first came following the end of the Vietnam War in April 1975 with the fall of Saigon. Vietnamese immigrants arriving during this time were highly educated with direct ties to the United States military and were well educated on the city they were settling in. The next wave of immigrants were "boat people", a population of Chinese Vietnamese refugees who braved the open waters in small boats to flee Vietnam after the Vietnam War between 1978 and 1982. This wave of immigrants were not as highly educated and of high social standing as the first wave, but the number of immigrants arriving to Houston was significantly greater. The third wave of Vietnamese refugees arrived through the 1980s and 1990s. They were fewer than the previous waves and consisted of political prisoners and families of U.S. servicemen.

=== Chinese ===
According to the American Community Survey, as of 2013, Greater Houston (Houston-Sugar Land-Baytown metropolitan area) has 72,320 residents of Chinese origin.

Chinese immigrants were the first significant settlement of Asian immigrants in Houston. The first 250 male Chinese immigrants came to work on constructing the Houston and Texas Central Railroad in 1870. Even though the population was increasing steadily, following the start of World War II the population of Chinese immigrants doubled as people were seeking out new economic opportunities.

=== South Asians ===
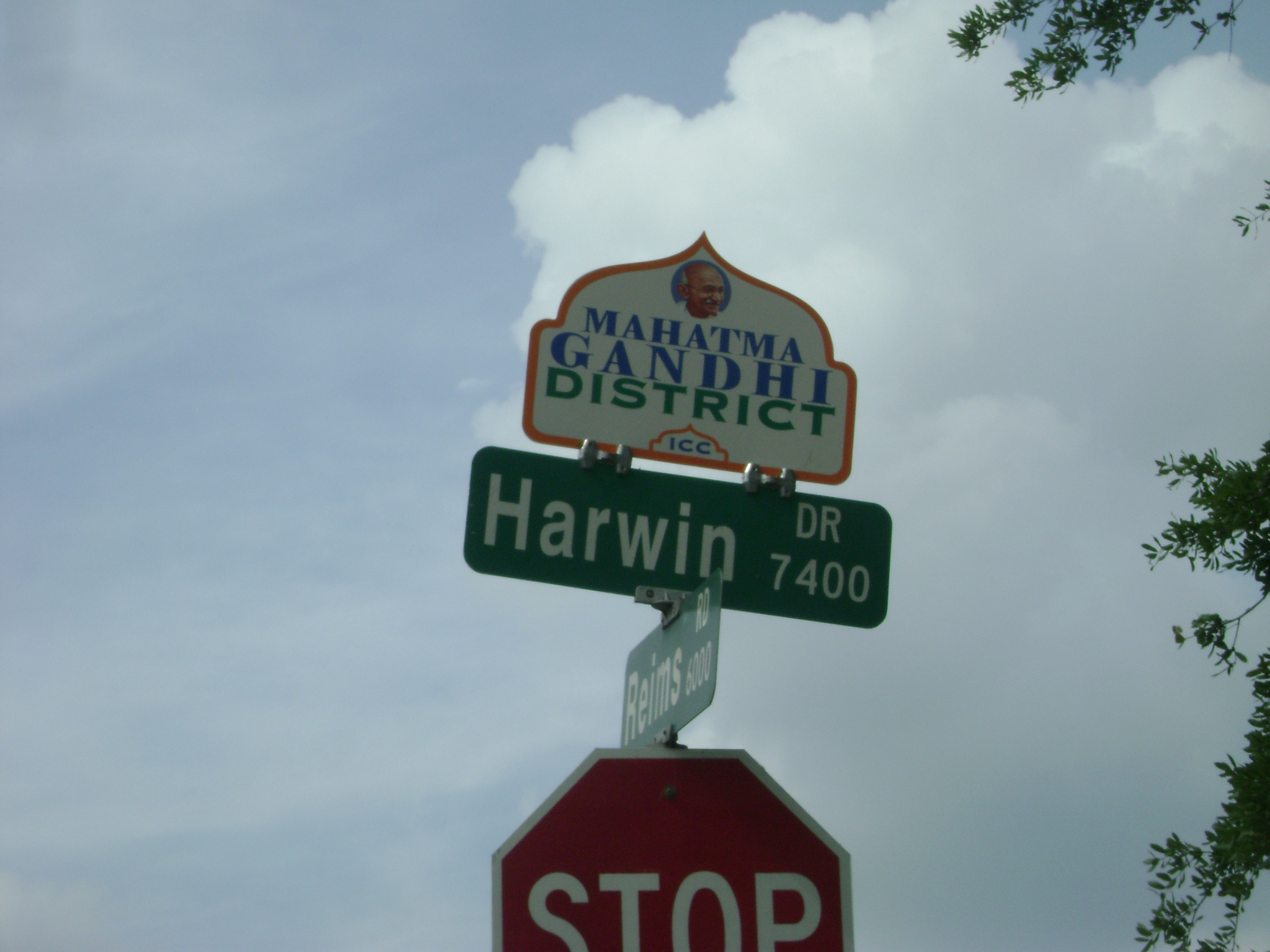
Mahatma Gandhi District in Houston

As of the 2010 U.S. census, if the Indian American and Pakistani American populations are combined, there are 50,045 of them in Harris County, together making up 17.9% of the Asians in Harris County and being the second largest Asian ethnic group in Harris County. The combined group was the largest Asian ethnic group in Fort Bend County, making up 31% of the Asians there, and the largest Asian ethnic group in Montgomery County.

South Asian populations became larger around the 1980s. In 1983 Allison Cook of the Texas Monthly stated that "Some estimates put the number of Indians and Pakistanis in Houston as high as 25,000." In 1990 there were a combined 21,191 Indian and Pakistani descent people in Harris County, making up 19.3% of the county's Asians and at the time being the third largest Asian ethnic group. In 2000 there were 35,971 members of the combined group in Harris County, making up 18.6% of the county's Asians and now being the second largest Asian ethnic group in the county. From 2000 to 2010 the combined group in Harris County increased by 39%. In Fort Bend County in 2000 there were 13,000 people of Indian and Pakistani ancestry.

Half a dozen Indian American and Pakistani American newspapers are offered in stores and restaurants. The publications include India Herald and the Voice of Asia. The city has Masala Radio, a South Asian radio station. Indian singers often make tour stops in Houston. The Bollywood 6 movie theater on Texas State Highway 6 plays Indian films. The Houston area has Indian dance schools, including the Abhinaya School of Performing Arts and the Shri Natraj School of Dance.

As of 2000, of the Zoroastrian groups in Houston, Parsi were one of the two main Zoroastrian groups. As of that year the total number of Iranians of all religions in Houston is, on a 10 to 1 basis, larger than the total Parsi population. As of 2000 the Zoroastrian Association of Houston (ZAH) is majority Parsi. Rustomji wrote that because of that and the historic tensions between the Parsi and Iranian groups, the Iranians in Houston did not become full members of the ZAH. Rustomji stated that Iranian Zoroastrians "attend religious functions sporadically and remain tentative about their ability to fully integrate, culturally and religiously, with Parsis."

==== Indians ====
As of the 2010 census there were about 82,575 people in the Houston area of Indian origins.

Following the 1965 Immigration Act there was a significant influx of Indian immigrants to the United States of America and consequently to Houston. The passing of this act brought educated immigrants seeking higher education and opportunities in the U.S.

The 1980 United States census stated that 6,610 persons originating from India were in the Houston area. Harris County had almost 36,000 Indian Americans as of the 2000 Census. The population had a $53,000 ($99086.96 in today's money) median yearly household income, $11,000 ($20565.22 in today's money) more than the county average. Almost 65% of the Indian Americans in Harris County had university and college degrees, compared to 18% of all of the Harris County population. Indian Americans in Fort Bend County, as of the same census, numbered at almost 13,000 and had a median annual income of $84,000 ($157043.48 in today's money). 62% of Indian Americans in Fort Bend County had university and college degrees, compared to 25% of all residents of Fort Bend County. An estimate from the 2009 American Community Survey stated that Harris County had 46,125 Indian Americans and that Fort Bend County had 25,104 Indian Americans. Katharine Shilcutt of the Houston Press said that the high education and income levels of Indian Americans caused businesses in the Mahatma Gandhi District, an Indian American ethnic enclave in Houston, to thrive.

In 1999 the Houston area had about 500 Indian Catholics. There were no particular Indian Catholic churches.

As of 2007, the median income of Indians in Houston was $50,250.

As of 2012 the majority of the city's Sikhs originate from the portion of Punjab in India.

As of 2007, there were over 24 Indian-American-oriented publications. As of that year, most Indian-American newspapers in Houston are in English. Some smaller newspapers are in Indian languages such as Hindi and Gujarati. The Indo-American News, a newspaper owned by K.L. Sindwani, is distributed to fifty locations in Southwest Houston and has a 5,000 copy-per-week print rate. As of 2007, each issue has 44 pages. Sindwani established it in 1982; at the time he was the only employee and each issue had eight pages.

The Indian Culture Center, catering to South Asian groups, opened in 1973, and the Gujarati Samaj, catering to Gujarati people in particular, opened in 1979; the latter group has Holi and Navatri events. An Indian Student Association is at the University of Houston.

The self-published novel An Indian in Cowboy Country was written by Indian immigrant Pradeep Anand, who works as an engineer and lives in Sugar Land.

In 2019 Indian Americans make up almost 50% of the Asian Americans in Fort Bend County. In 2021 the county had about 24 Indian Christian churches.

==== Pakistanis ====
In 2007 the Pakistani-American Association of Greater Houston (PAGH) stated that about 60,000 people of Pakistani origin lived in Greater Houston and that many of them lived in Southwest Houston. As of 2000, over 70% of the Muslims in Houston are Indian or Pakistani.

Similar to Indian immigrants, Pakistani immigrants came to Houston during the Cold War. The passing of the 1965 Immigration Act brought highly educated immigrants and opportunistic hopefuls.

==== Bangladeshis ====
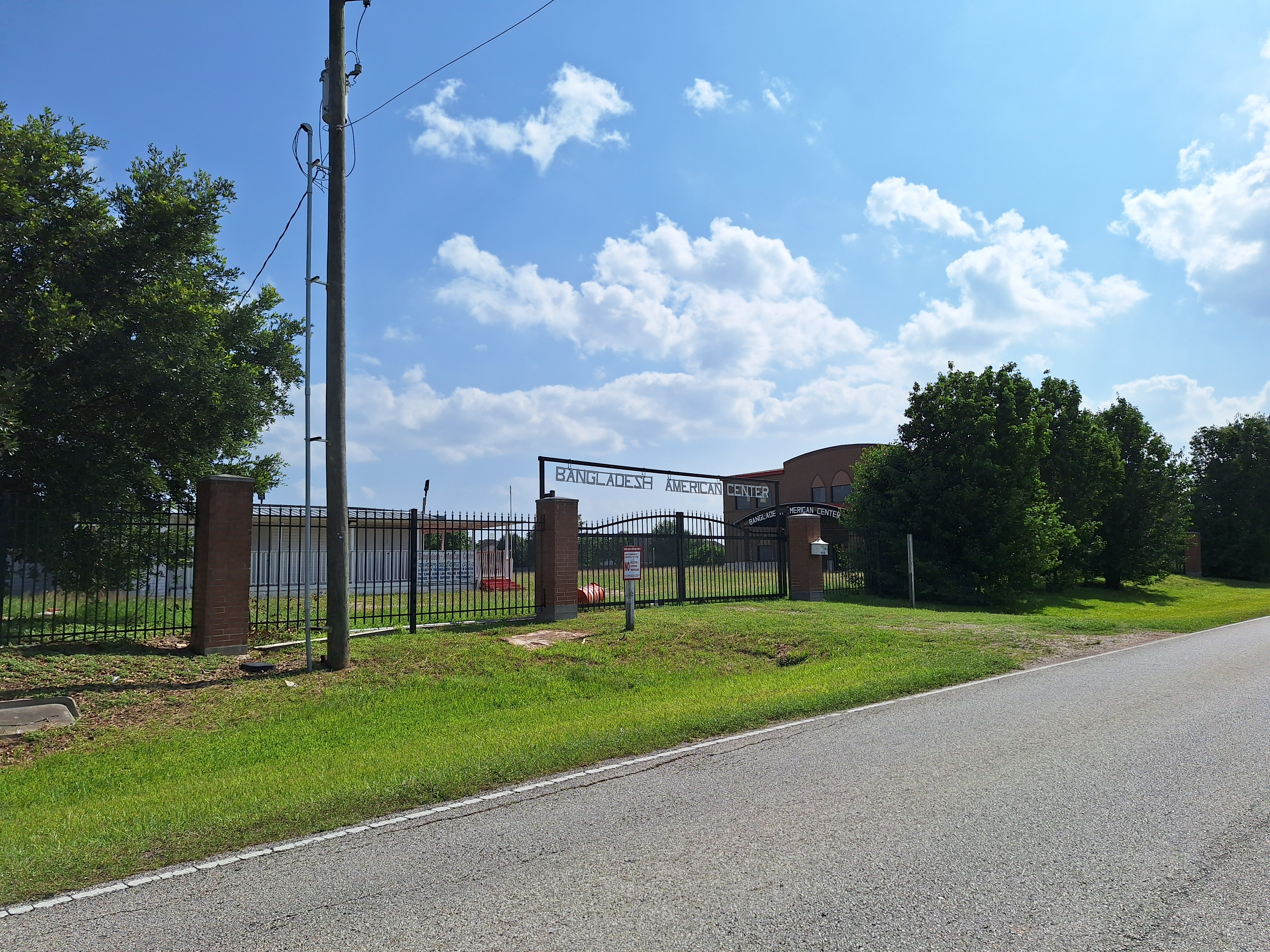
Bangladeshi American Center

The Bangladesh Association, Houston (BAH, Bengali: বাংলাদেশ এসোসিয়েশন, হিউস্টন), Bangladesh Students Association at the University of Houston, and Bangladesh Society of Greater Houston are the Bangladeshi groups in the city.

The initial immigration of Bangladeshis to the United States was kickstarted after the independence of Bangladesh in 1971, though there is not a large population of Bangladeshi-Americans in Houston.

In 1971 the Bangladeshi American community in Greater Houston consisted of about 10 university students; 1971 was the year when Bangladesh, previously East Pakistan, seceded from Pakistan. As of 2011 the Bangladeshi American population of Greater Houston includes over 10,000 people. The Bangladesh Association bought 4 acres (1.6 ha) of land in southwestern unincorporated Harris County in 2001. By 2011 the association announced plans to develop the $2.5 million ($3578032.54 in today's money) facility Bangladeshi American Center, which will include auditoriums, classrooms, a playground, and an outdoor sports complex. The first donor conference was held at the Stafford Civic Center in Stafford. In 2012, the Bangladeshi Students Association at the University of Houston was resurrected after a ten-year hiatus. This organization was first formed in the 70s soon after the independence of Bangladesh in 1971. UH BSA serves as the link between the 2nd generation of Bangladeshis and the older generation.

=== Filipinos ===
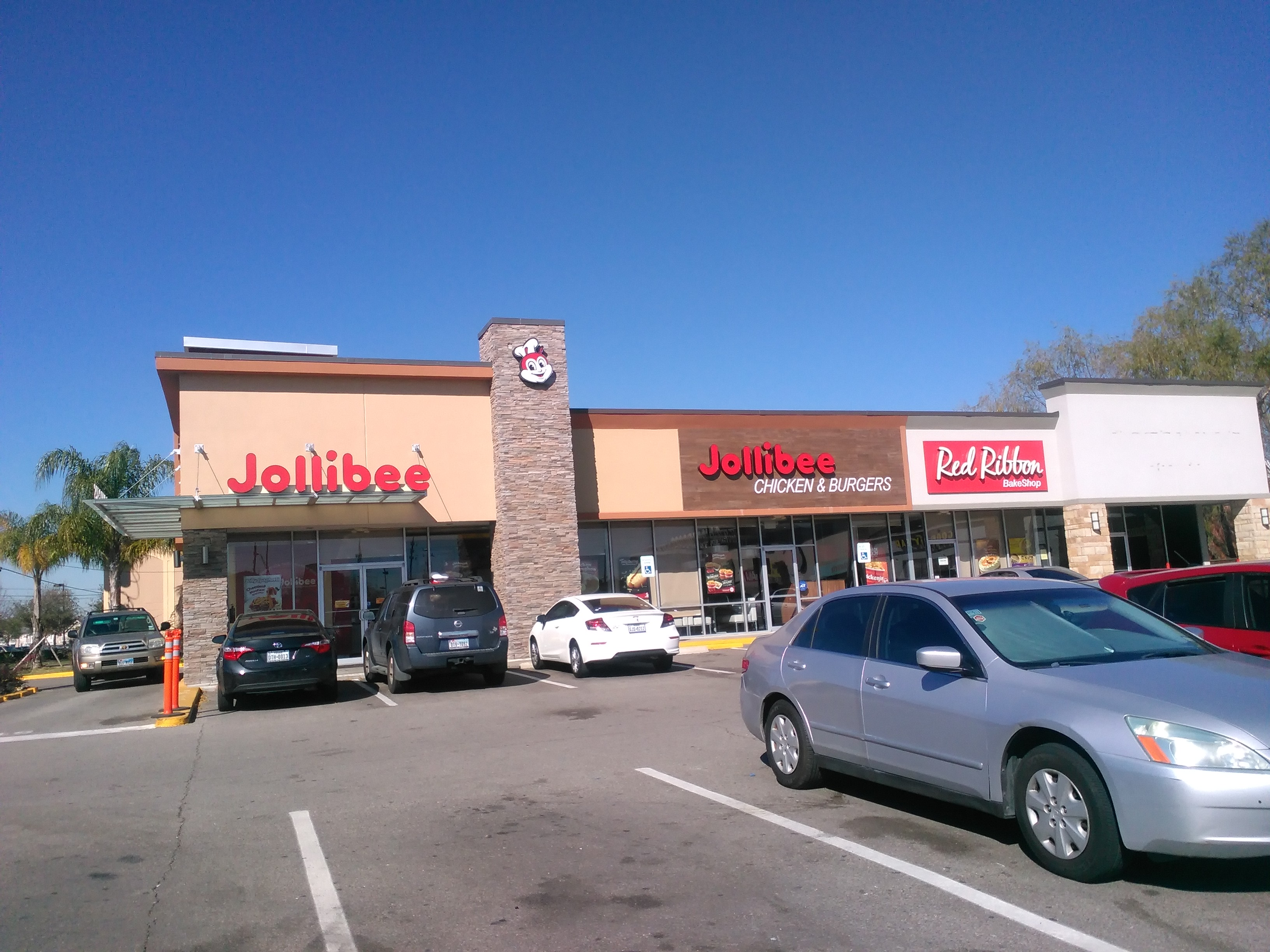
A Jollibee restaurant in Houston

As of the 2010 U.S. Census there were 22,575 ethnic Filipinos in Harris County, making up 8.1% of the county's Asian population, the third largest Asian American group in the Houston area.

Relatively few persons of Filipino origin had come to Houston by 1960, and around 1970 the entire State of Texas had about 50,000 people of Filipino origin. The Immigration and Nationality Act of 1965 allowed for more immigration from Asia, and Filipino immigration increased by the 1980s. Many ethnic Filipinos began working in the Texas Medical Center around that time as Filipino medical professionals gained employment in the U.S. due to their English proficiency. In 1990 there were 10,502 ethnic Filipinos in Harris County, making up 9.6% of the county's Asian population. In 2000 this had increased to 15,576, making up 8.1% of the county's Asian population. The Filipino population increased by 45% from 2000 to 2010.

In 1980 the Philippine Nurses Association of Metropolitan Houston was established.

In 1999 the Houston area had about 40,000 Filipino Catholics. There were no particular Filipino Catholic churches. Some Filipinos in the area are Protestants and attend Baptist and Methodist churches.

A Jollibee is located near NRG Park, which opened in 2013. It was placed proximity to the Texas Medical Center, where Filipino nurses work, and was the first location in the State of Texas. Next to it is a Filipino Asian market and restaurant called Cherry Foodarama. The area is currently being developed into a Little Manila and the area surrounding NRG Park has the highest percentage of Filipino Americans within Houston's city limits. Other areas in the Greater Houston area with significant Filipino populations are Alief, Brays Oaks, Fort Bend County, and Pearland.

=== Koreans ===
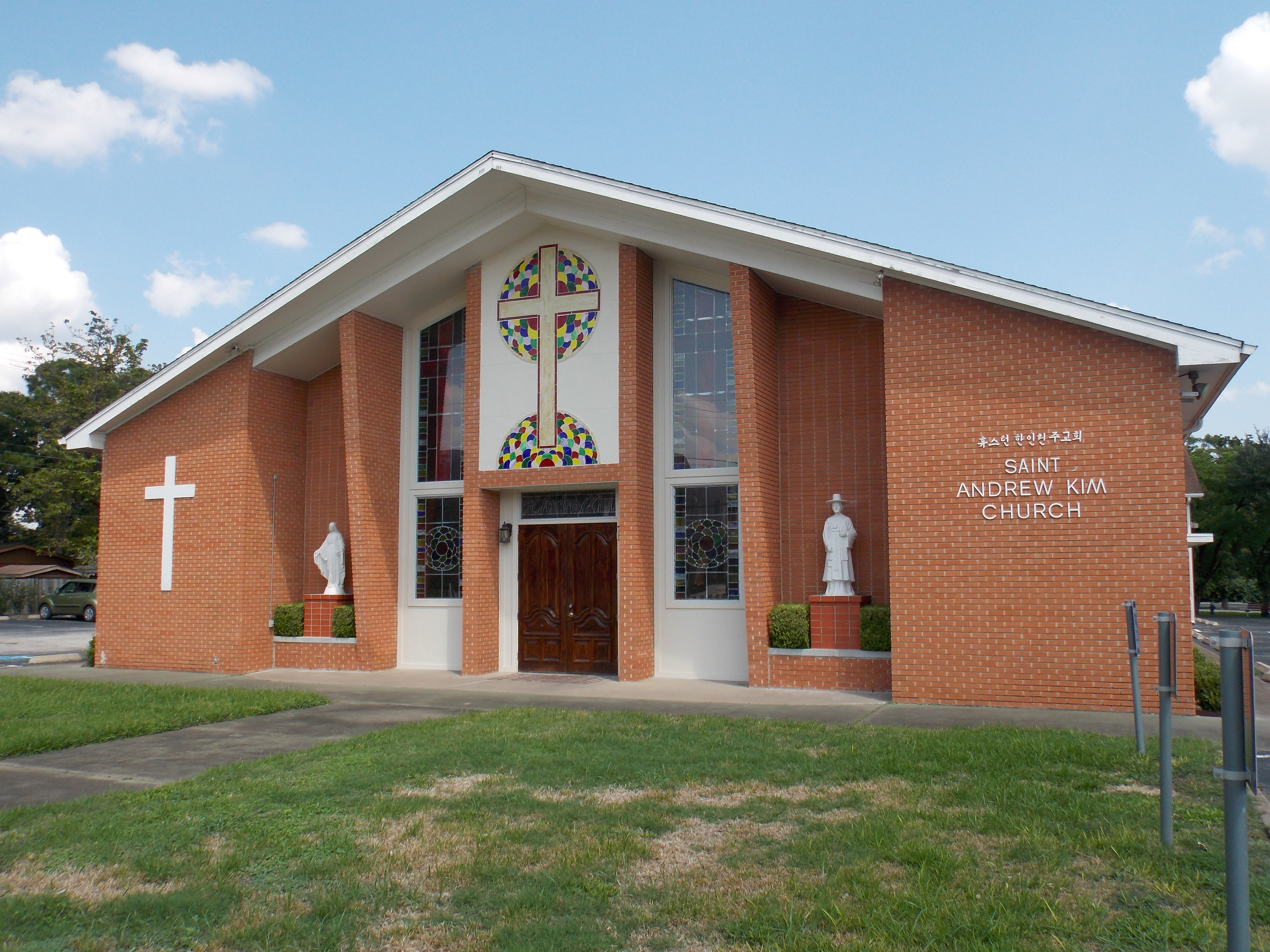
St. Andrew Kim Catholic Church (Korean: 휴스턴한인천주교회) in Spring Branch

As of the 2010 U.S. Census there were 11,813 ethnic Koreans in Harris County, making up 4.2% of the county's Asian population. In 2015 Haejin E. Koh, author of "Korean Americans in Houston: Building Bridges across Cultures and Generations," wrote in regards to the census figure that "community leaders believe the number is twice as large."

In 1970 the official census figure for people of Korean origins in the entire state was 2,090. Bruce Glasrud, a historian, stated that the real figure may be higher as some previous Korean immigrants were counted as Japanese, as Korea was then under the Empire of Japan. As of 1983 there were about 10,000 ethnic Korean people in Houston. In 1990 there were 6,571 ethnic Koreans, making up 6% of the county's Asian population. In 2000 this figure had increased to 8,764, making up 4.5% of the county's Asian population. The number of Koreans increased by 35% from 2000 to 2010. Houston's Korean American population is mostly concentrated in Spring Branch with a sizable portion in Greater Katy.

=== Japanese ===
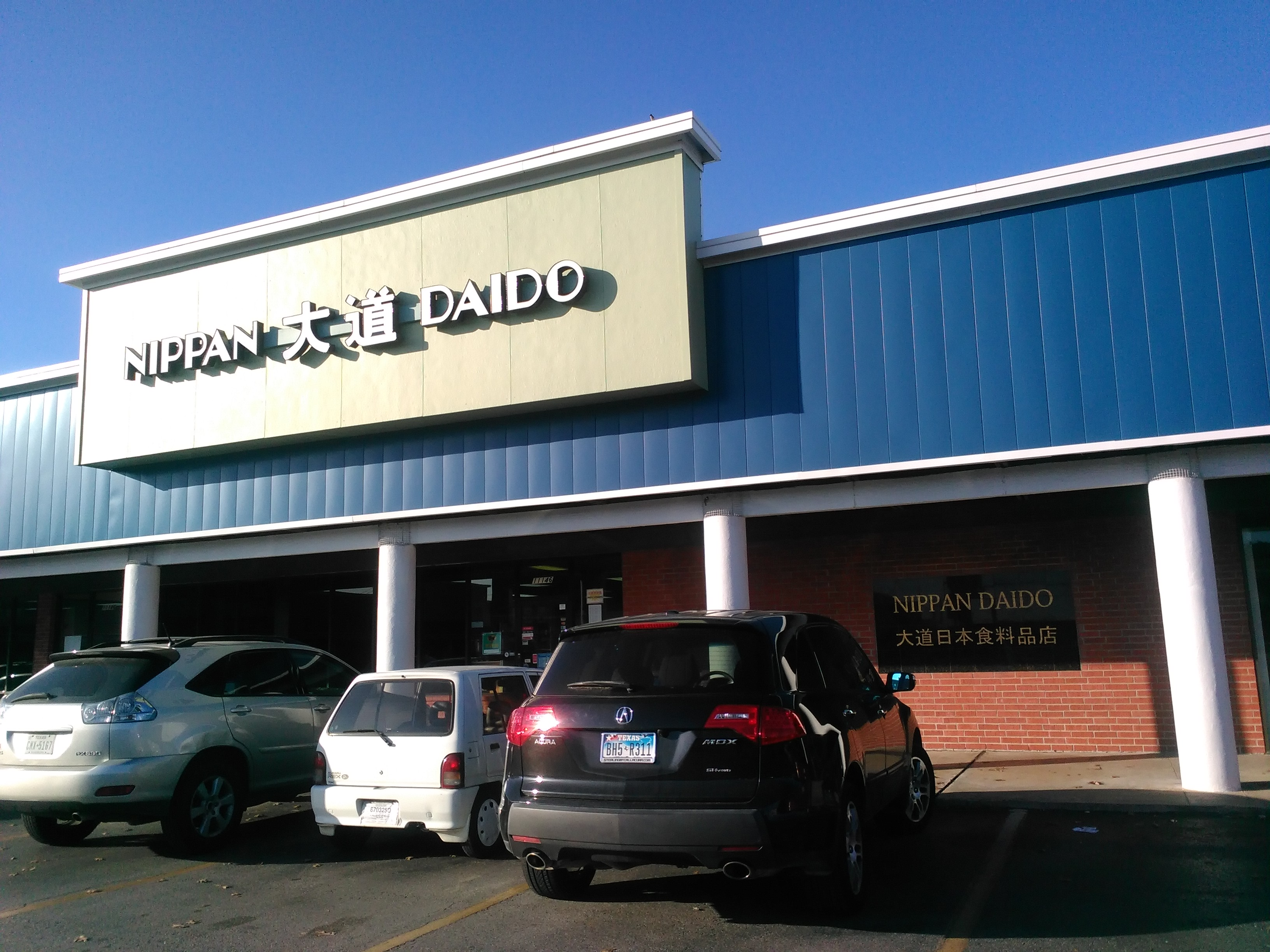
Nippan Daido (大道日本食料品店), a Japanese supermarket in Westchase, Houston

As of the 2010 U.S. census, there were 3,566 people of Japanese descent in Harris County, making up 1.3% of the Asians in the county. In 1990 there were 3,425 ethnic Japanese in the county, making up 3.1% of the county's Asians, and in 2000 there were 3,574 ethnic Japanese in the county, making up 1.9% of the county's Asians.

The immigration of Japanese people to Houston was initiated by the efforts of two Japanese men, Sadatsuchi Uchida and Seito Saibara. Their idea and venture ultimately led to the first rice plantation in Texas that attracted Japanese men and their wives.

=== Cambodians ===
The first Cambodians arrived in Houston while fleeing the Cambodian genocide. Agencies used Houston's climate as a reason to place Cambodian refugees there. A 23-house complex called "Khmer Village" was established off of Interstate 10 (Eastex Freeway) in the east side of the city.

A woman named Yani Rose Keo became a community leader and was involved in the affairs of Cambodians who settled in Houston. In 2000 Yani Keo stated that 80,000 people of Cambodian origins lived in Houston while Greater Houston had a total of 82,000 people of Cambodian origins. Many Cambodians in Houston operate doughnut shops; according to Samoeurn Phan, a Cambodian man quoted by food writer Robb Walsh in The Washington Post, about 90% of the doughnut shops in Houston were owned by Cambodians in 2017.

In 1985 Keo established a farm in an area called "Little Cambodia," in Brazoria County, near Rosharon. Terrence McCoy of the Houston Press stated that there were "perhaps" 90 families of Cambodian origin living there. In the 2000s (decade) the farmers got into a dispute with the Texas Parks and Wildlife Department (TPWD) over the farming of water spinach, which the TPWD classified as “Harmful or Potentially Harmful Exotic Fish, Shellfish and Aquatic Plants.” Ultimately the TPWD allowed the farming of water spinach with proper mandated state regulations. "Little Cambodia" sustained damage during Hurricane Ike in 2008, and in Hurricane Harvey in 2017.

As of 2015, 77583, the ZIP code of Rosharon, Texas, has the highest concentration of Cambodian Americans in the Greater Houston area.

Circa the 1980s there was the Cambodian/Khmer School of Houston.

=== Afghans ===
The South Texas Office of Refugees stated that from 2009 to 2021 11,790 people came from Afghanistan to the Houston area, with 90% of them having Special Immigrant Visas which belonged to Afghans who interpreted for the U.S. military. From 2015 to 2021 1,700 people from Afghanistan who interpreted for U.S. military forces and/or are family members of these interpreters moved to the Houston area. According to the Refugee Resettlement Data 1975–2018 dataset by the University of Gottingen and the University of Western Australia, 885 refugees from Afghanistan moved to Harris County between 1975 and 2018; according to the data, Afghans made up the 16th largest such group in the county.

In 2021 the Houston Chronicle reported that Afghans in Houston had negative views of the Fall of Kabul on August 15, where the Taliban replaced the former Afghan government with the Islamic Emirate of Afghanistan. The group Afghan Community Houston held protests denouncing the Taliban takeover. Between the Fall of Kabul and August 18, 100 Afghans moved to Houston from Fort Lee. On August 19 the group The Alliance stated on August 19 that it planned to move 70 Afghan refugees to Houston later that month.

=== Other ethnic groups ===
In addition Houston has populations of Asians from other countries in Southeast Asia and East Asia. This includes Burma (Myanmar), Indonesia, and Thailand. In 2010 there were 40,684 Asians from Burma, Cambodia, Indonesia, and Thailand living in Harris County, making up 14.5% of the Asians there.

By 2023, Houston Buddhist Vihara became the gathering hub of Houston's Sri Lankan community.

In 1990 there were 12,114 Asians from other countries in Harris County, making up 11% of the county's Asian population. In 2000 the number had increased to 20,579, making up 10.7% of the county's Asian population. The other Asian population of Harris County increased by almost 100% from 2000 to 2010.

As of 1983 the Consulate-General of Indonesia, Houston estimated that 300 Indonesian persons were in Houston. As of 2004 Houston had the fifth largest Indonesian population in the United States; this helps sustain the consulate.

Over the three years leading to 2009, Houston took about 2,200 Burmese.

== Geography ==
The Asian American population of Greater Katy was about 40,000 in 2019, and from 2000 to 2010 that population increased 300%. By 2020 large numbers of Asian Americans settled suburbs in the Houston area, and Asian Americans were the racial group with the highest growth rates in multiple Houston area counties. In particular, as the years passed, migration spread beyond Chinatown and Bellaire Boulevard and moved to more Suburban communities, the famous ones being Katy and Sugar Land. Additionally, there has been studies showing that the Asian American communities are still expanding in Cypress, Pearland, and Spring. This shows that till this day the community is still growing.

With the growth of the community, many developments have been established. For example, there is a development called Katy Asia Town, which is 1.5 acres (0.61 ha) large. It includes an H Mart., a famous Korean grocery. Throughout Houston, there is also Hong Kong Food Market and Saigon Asian Market which sells authentic snacks and food from the countries bringing a piece of familiarity and home to these communities.

== Institutions ==
In 2010, the Houston Asian American Archives (HAAA), a part of the Chao Center for Asian Studies, Rice University opened.

The Chao Center for Asian Studies is also a major research hub that focuses on transnational and diasporic in the Asian regions. It also offers many workshops and film screening to learn and celebrate Asian culture and works with closely with the Department of Transnational Asian Studies at Rice University.

== Commerce ==
In 2002, Asian Americans received about one quarter of loans given in the Houston area by the Small Business Administration. These small business are a critical part of the local economy as districts like Chinatown and Bellaire Boulevard are major cultural centres that are regularly crowded and generate big revenue. They tend to specialise in the food industry, retail as well as the beauty industry. Newly, around 2020, ethnic Asian bakeries opened in Houston, including those of Taiwanese and Vietnamese backgrounds that have been a hit.

== Politics ==
Chen and Harwell wrote circa 2015 that the amount of Asian Americans could "swing an election" even though they were not "a large voting bloc", arguing that Lee P. Brown's efforts to make campaign material via telephone and in writing in Asian languages helped secure his victory in the 2001 city elections.

The Houston 80-20 Asian American Political Action Committee, created in 1999, was set up to represent minorities of Asian origin and to support candidates perceived as supporting them; this PAC does not support any particular political party.

Beverley Clark, of mixed Chinese and African-American origins, was elected to the Houston City Council in 1989, being the first city council member of Asian origins. Martha Wong, elected to the council in 1993, was the first person of majority Asian origins to be elected to the council. The first person of an at-large position on the council of Asian origins was Gordon Quan, elected in 1999. The first Muslim on the council, M. J. Khan, an ethnic Pakistani elected in 2003, was also classified as Asian.

In 1987 Hannah Chow was elected as the No. 5 official of the Harris County Criminal Court of Law, making her the first elected official of the Harris County government of Asian origins.

Overall, as these populations have continued to increase its political leverage also grew. With this, voter participation increase and there was higher visibility and better inclusion in local authority.
