= Concursion =

2014 platform video game

- Developer: Puuba
- Publisher: Puuba
- Engine: LWJGL
- Platforms: Windows, OS X
- Release: WW: June 6, 2014
- Genre: Puzzle-platform
- Mode: Single-player

Concursion is a 2014 puzzle-platform game developed and published by American independent studio Puuba. The game was released on June 6, 2014 for Microsoft Windows and OS X.

== Gameplay ==
The core gameplay mechanic of Concursion is the progress across a series of separately defined levels which each feature a different take on the interplay among five different two-dimensional video game worlds overlapping one another for mysterious reasons. As the player passes through each geometrically defined genre region, the player's appearance and control scheme frequently transform in real time between: speed-based platformer, combat-based platformer, space shooter, jetpack explorer, and maze runner. The game's enemies, furthermore, will change form and behavior when crossing the border from one game dimension to another. There is a shared health system for all hero types, and the player will die when the health pool is reduced to zero by taking damage, or when they fall into a pit.

The goal of Concursion is to rescue Princess Honeybluff, a stereotypical video game princess, who is kidnapped by a similarly stereotypical bad guy, Darklord Biganbad, at the game's start. Throughout the game, there are "gem shards" to collect, which impact the player's ability to find the princess and put the world back to normal. There are seven acts, each consisting of a number of levels (between seven and eleven per act). Each level has a target time for completion, and a set number of gem shards to collect. Each act ends when the player defeats a Boss.

== Development ==
Concursion is the first game developed by Puuba, Inc, an indie video game company owned and operated by Daniel Garfield, based in Encino, California. Christopher Hoag, an Emmy nominated composer best known for his work on the pilot episode of the TV show House, created a soundtrack for Concursion that features multiple versions of each level song, each aurally distinct from one another, which swap in real time, based upon which gameplay style is currently active in the game. Puuba developed Concursion over a period of fourteen months.

== Reception ==
Concursion reviews

Aggregate scores
Aggregator	Score
GameRankings	66.66% (9 reviews)
Metacritic	66/100 (7 reviews)

Review scores
Publication	Score
Eurogamer	6/10
Hardcore Gamer	3/5
WeGotThisCovered	3.5/5

Metacritic gives the game a "mixed or average reviews" score of 66/100 based on 7 reviews. GameRankings gives the game a score of 66.6 based on 9 reviews. Jeffrey Matulef of Eurogamer refers to Concursion as "a premise so clever, so simple, that it's a wonder it's not been done before". Pete Davison of USGamer says the game is "an intriguing, creative curiosity worth keeping an eye on".
