= Archives for the Unexplained =

Archives for the Unexplained (AFU), formerly known as Archives for UFO research (Swedish: Arkivet för UFO-forskning) is a depository dedicated to collecting materials about UFOs, ufology, Forteana, cryptozoology, paranormal phenomena and folklore. AFU is a nonprofit foundation situated in Norrköping, Sweden. The collections take up approximately 3.5 kilometers of shelf space in 15 locations. Included are over 55,000 books in various languages, 88,000 magazine issues representing 8,000 annual magazines, 650,000 newspaper clippings, 30,000 photographs, films, tape records, memorabilia, and more.

AFU also possesses Scandinavian and British archives, including over 55,000 reports and collections about organizational and personal files. The archive also collects scale models, paintings, paraphernalia, posters, clothes, toys, and other items.

== History ==
Archives for the Unexplained was founded in Södertälje in 1973 by Håkan Blomqvist, Kjell Jonsson, and Anders Liljegren, originally being called the Work Group for Ufology. The purpose was to provide information for UFO researchers and build a specialized research library for UFO literature.

In 1980, AFU was converted to a charitable foundation and the archive was moved to its current location in Norrköping. Through a special agreement in 1986, AFU is connected to the national organization UFO-Sweden, and takes the role of managing the organization's archives and libraries. The daily operation is run by a permanent staff and entirely on a voluntary basis by contributions from private sponsors. Chairman is Clas Svahn.

In 2013, its name was changed to Archives for the Unexplained.

== Collection ==
AFU stores UFO reports submitted and documented by private and military investigators in Sweden. The archive manages UFO-Sweden's report archive. Material is continuously being added from the organization's central and field investigators. The report archive includes about 20,000 Swedish observations and copies of all available open UFO investigations since 1946 made by the Swedish Armed Forces (about 2,000 cases, mostly ghost rockets Swedish: spökraketer). The archive has received donations of comprehensive report archives from Norway, Denmark, and others.

Journals from around the world that are within the scope of the archive topics are saved regularly. The archives currently have tens of thousands of booklets. The collection includes all kinds of regularly published writings from religious cults newsletters to comics with scientific ambitions. Most of the journals describe reported UFO cases and debate of UFO topics in different parts of the world.

To organize the collection, librarians developed a specialized subject classification scheme for the topic.

U.S. News & World Report described it as "among the most comprehensive digital libraries for UFO sightings and investigations into them by governments worldwide."

== See also ==
- Archives of the Impossible
- List of UFO organizations
