= Ariel School UFO incident =

1994 sighting in Zimbabwe

Coordinates: 17.863520°S 31.291140°E

On 16 September 1994, a UFO sighting occurred near Ruwa, Zimbabwe. Sixty-two pupils at Ariel School, ranging in age from six and twelve, reported observing one or more silver-colored objects descend from the sky and land in a field adjacent to the school. Several pupils also described encountering humanoid figures dressed in black, whom they said communicated telepathically and conveyed a message concerning environmental issues. The encounter was followed by visible signs of distress among several children.

Fortean writer Jerome Clark described the incident as the "most remarkable close encounter of the third kind of the 1990s". Some skeptics have interpreted the reports as an instance of mass hysteria. Not all students present at the school that day reported seeing anything (Note: The Mail & Guardian article linked says that there were "more than 110 children and staff" at the school that day. The Brian Dunning article says "250 schoolchildren were all outside playing at the Ariel School".) Several of those who did report an encounter have maintained that their accounts were truthful.

== Background ==
Ruwa is a small agricultural centre located 22 kilometres (14 mi) southeast of the capital Harare. At the time of the incident, it was not a town but only a local place-name, "little more than a crossroads in an agricultural region".

Ariel School was an expensive private school. Most of the pupils were from wealthy white families in Harare. The school also had pupils from several Zimbabwean tribes as well as pupils of Indian descent.

Two days prior to the incident at Ariel, there had been a number of UFO sightings throughout southern Africa. There had been numerous reports of a bright fireball passing through the sky at night. Many people answered ZBC Radio's request to call in and describe what they had seen. Although some witnesses interpreted the fireball as a comet or meteor, it resulted in a wave of UFO mania in Zimbabwe at the time.

According to skeptic Brian Dunning, the fireball "had been the re-entry of the Zenit-2 rocket from the Cosmos 2290 satellite launch. The booster broke up into burning streaks as it moved silently across the sky, giving an impressive light show to millions of Africans." Local UFO researcher Cynthia Hind recorded other alien sightings at this time, including a daylight sighting by a young boy and his mother and a report of alleged beings on a road by a trucker.

== Incident ==
The sightings at Ariel School occurred at approximately 10:00 a.m. on 16 September 1994, while pupils were outside during the mid-morning break. At the time, the school's adult staff were inside attending a meeting.

The encounter lasted around fifteen minutes. The woman responsible for operating the school's tuckshop was the only adult in the immediate vicinity of the students. Following the event, numerous children approached her, displaying varying degrees of what she later described as fear and curiosity.

When the students returned to class, they reported what they had witnessed to their teachers, but their accounts were initially dismissed.

After returning home, the children recounted the incident to their parents. The following day, many of them went to the school to discuss the reports with members of the faculty. The incident was subsequently reported on ZBC Radio, where it came to the attention of Cynthia Hind.

== Coverage ==
The BBC's correspondent in Zimbabwe, Tim Leach, visited the school on 19 September to film interviews with pupils and staff. After investigating this incident, Leach stated "I could handle war zones, but I could not handle this". Hind visited the school on 20 September 1994. She interviewed some of the children and asked them to draw pictures of what they had seen. She reported that the children all told her the same story.

That November, Harvard University professor of psychiatry John Mack visited the Ariel School to interview witnesses. Throughout the 1990s, Mack had investigated UFO sightings and the alien abduction phenomenon.

According to the interviews of Hind, Leach, and Mack, 62 children between the ages of six and twelve said that they had seen at least one UFO. One or more silver objects, usually described as discs, appeared in the sky, which then floated down to a field of brush and small trees just outside school property.

Between one and four beings with big eyes and dressed all in black exited a craft and approached the children. At this point, many of the children ran; however some, mostly older pupils, stayed and watched the approach. According to Mack's interviews, an environmental message was then telepathically communicated to the children prior to the being (or beings) returning to the craft and flying away. According to Dunning, this telepathic message aspect of the story was not included in Hind or Leach's reports, only Mack's, although Hind reported it later.

In Mack's interviews, one fifth-grader tells how he was warned "about something that's going to happen" and that "pollution mustn't be". An eleven-year-old girl told Mack "I think they want people to know that we're actually making harm on this world and we mustn’t get too technologed [sic]." One child said that he was told that the world would end because humans are not taking care of the planet.

The children were adamant that they had not seen a plane. Hind noted that the different cultural background of the children gave rise to different interpretations of what they had seen, and they did not all believe that they had seen extraterrestrials. She noted that some of the children thought the short little beings were tikoloshes, creatures of Shona and Ndebele folklore.

== Aftermath ==
The Ariel School UFO incident quickly became one of the most famous UFO cases in Africa. On a June 2021 episode of the BBC's Witness History, the event was described as "one of the most significant events in UFO history". Ufologists continue to cite the case as providing compelling evidence of extraterrestrial visitation. Skeptics have suggested the incident could be explained as mass hysteria, or a prank. Gideon Reid proposed the hypothesis of a confusion with touring puppet shows which had been designed to promote awareness around AIDS, literacy, "teach agricultural best practices", or sell products. It has alternatively been argued that the children misidentified a dust devil.

Because Hind interviewed the children in groups of two to six with the other children allowed to listen, Dunning asserts their stories were at heightened risk for "cross-contamination". Mack only interviewed the children two months after the alleged sighting and Dunning proposes that Mack, a known environmentalist, "prompted and suggested" the telepathic communication angle, which was not present in Hind's previous report.

Several of the witnesses maintain that what was reported is true. In 2014, the Mail & Guardian spoke to one witness who said that she fears that the beings will return and that she can "sense when they are back in the atmosphere". In 2016, witness Emily Trim exhibited paintings that she described as a "manifestation of the messages she received" from the beings that day. In June 2021, Barstool Sports writer Zah spoke in an interview about being a pupil in Ariel that day. He recounted that he saw a bright light come down from the sky and aliens disembark. Other witnesses were interviewed for the 2020 documentary The Phenomenon and spoke about how the experience has affected them.

In 2023, in the Netflix documentary Encounters, a former student named Dallyn claimed that he was behind this incident. He claimed that he purposefully told his classmates and other students that a "shiny rock" in the distance was a UFO. According to his own statement, he never thought this would work, and was surprised about the mass hysteria. Dallyn's claims in the documentary directly contradict claims made on camera 15 years prior to the documentary, describing the UFO as having a light that would "flash a different color in the sky". They also contradict all the other Ariel School witnesses' testimony in the film.

== See also ==
- List of reported UFO sightings
- Westall UFO, a similar UFO sighting by school students
