= Out of the Blue (2003 film) =

- Directed by: James Fox; Tim Coleman; Boris Zubov
- Written by: James Fox; Tim Coleman; Boris Zubov; Charles Fox
- Narrated by: Peter Coyote
- Distributed by: Hannover House (DVD)
- Release date: 2003
- Running time: 96 minutes
- Country: United States
- Language: English

Out of the Blue is a 2003 feature-length documentary film on the UFO phenomenon which premiered on television on the Sci Fi Channel on June 24, 2003. It was produced by American filmmaker James Fox.

The film is narrated by Peter Coyote and attempts to show, through interviews with members of the scientific community, eyewitnesses and high-ranking military and government personnel; that some unidentified flying objects could be of extraterrestrial origin and that secrecy and ridicule are used to shroud the UFO issue.

There is a follow-up sequel released as a History Channel special in 2009, named I Know What I Saw also by James Fox, which expands upon the testimonies given in Out of the Blue as well as documenting new alleged sightings in the interim period after the release of Out of the Blue.
