= Benjamin N. Woodson =

American insurance executive and philanthropist (1908–2001)

Benjamin N. "Woody" Woodson (June 5, 1908 – July 17, 2001), born in Altoona, Kansas, was an American insurance executive and philanthropist who was known as "Mr. Life Insurance."

Woodson's parents moved often, and he graduated from high school in Omaha, Nebraska. He then worked for Union Pacific and excelled as a typist, which led to a position as a stenographer and agent at Bankers Reserve Life Insurance company in Omaha. By 1928 he moved to Chicago, Illinois to work for Mutual Trust Life Insurance Company, where he eventually became a regional director. His success was noticed by American General Corporation's CEO Gus Sessions Wortham who brought Woodson to Houston, Texas to assume the role of President of the corporation. In 1972, Woodson succeeded Wortham as CEO, a position he held until his retirement in 1978.

He was the author of several books including More Power to You (1950), The Set of the Sail (1968), A Financial Services Supermarket: The American General Story (1974), and Simple Truth (1980).

In the Houston community, Woodson served as regent at the University of Houston, director of the Society for the Performing Arts, chairman of the Houston Chamber of Commerce, was on the Board of Governors at Rice University, and also made significant financial contributions to Rice.

The Woodson Research Center at Rice University in Houston, Texas is named in his honor.
