= Sartre Studies International =

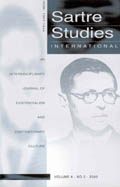
- Discipline: Philosophy
- Language: English
- Edited by: John Gillespie, Katherine Morris, John Ireland, Constance Mui

Publication details
- History: 1997–present
- Publisher: Berghahn Books
- Frequency: Biannually

Standard abbreviations
- ISO 4: Sartre Stud. Int.

Indexing
- ISSN: 1357-1559

Links
- Journal homepage

Sartre Studies International is a journal published by Berghahn Books in association with the United Kingdom Sartre Society and North American Sartre Society, and focuses on the philosophical, literary and political issues originating in existentialism, and explores the continuing vitality of existentialist and Sartrean ideas in contemporary society and culture. Each issue contains a reviews section and a notice board of current events, such as conferences, publications and media broadcasts linked to Jean Paul Sartre's life, work and intellectual legacy. It is edited conjointly by John Gillespie, Katherine Morris, John Ireland, and Constance Mui.

== Indexing / Abstracting ==
Sartre Studies International is indexed/abstracted in:

- British Humanities Index
- Expanded Academic ASAP
- International Bibliography of Book Reviews of Scholarly Literature on the Humanities and Social Sciences (IBR)
- International Biblio of Periodical Literature (IBZ)
- International Political Science Abstracts
- Left Index
- Literature Resource Center
- MLA Directory of Periodicals
- MLA International Bibliography
- Philosopher's Index
