= Washington Library Association =

Professional association in Washington state, US

- Formation: March 27, 1905
- Headquarters: Seattle, Washington
- Website: wla.org

The Washington Library Association (WLA) is a professional organization for librarians and library workers in the U.S. state of Washington. It is headquartered in Seattle and has 1,504 individual members and 49 institution members as of 2019.

WLA was founded by the Washington State Library at a meeting in Tacoma on March 27, 1905. Meetings were held annually until 1909 when the first WLA was merged with the newly formed Pacific Northwest Library Association. It was briefly organized as the Puget Sound Library Association and then re-established in its current form with its first meeting on June 30, 1932. The WLA has published an academic journal called Alki since 1983.

WLA has four divisions: Academic, Public, School, and Special. WLA also has eleven interest-based sections, Collection Development & Technical Services (CATS), Children's and Young Adult Services (CAYAS), College Libraries Across Washington State (CLAWS), Intellectual Freedom Section (IFS), Leadership is For Everyone (LIFE), Library & Information Student Section (LISS), Serving Adults in Libraries (SAIL), Social Responsibilities (SRRT), WA Library Employees (WALE), WA Library Trainers (WALT), and WA Library Friends, Foundations, Trustees, and Advocates (WLFFTA).

== See also ==
- List of libraries in the United States
