= Woodson Research Center =

Archive in Houston, Texas

Coordinates: 29.7178°N 95.4002°W

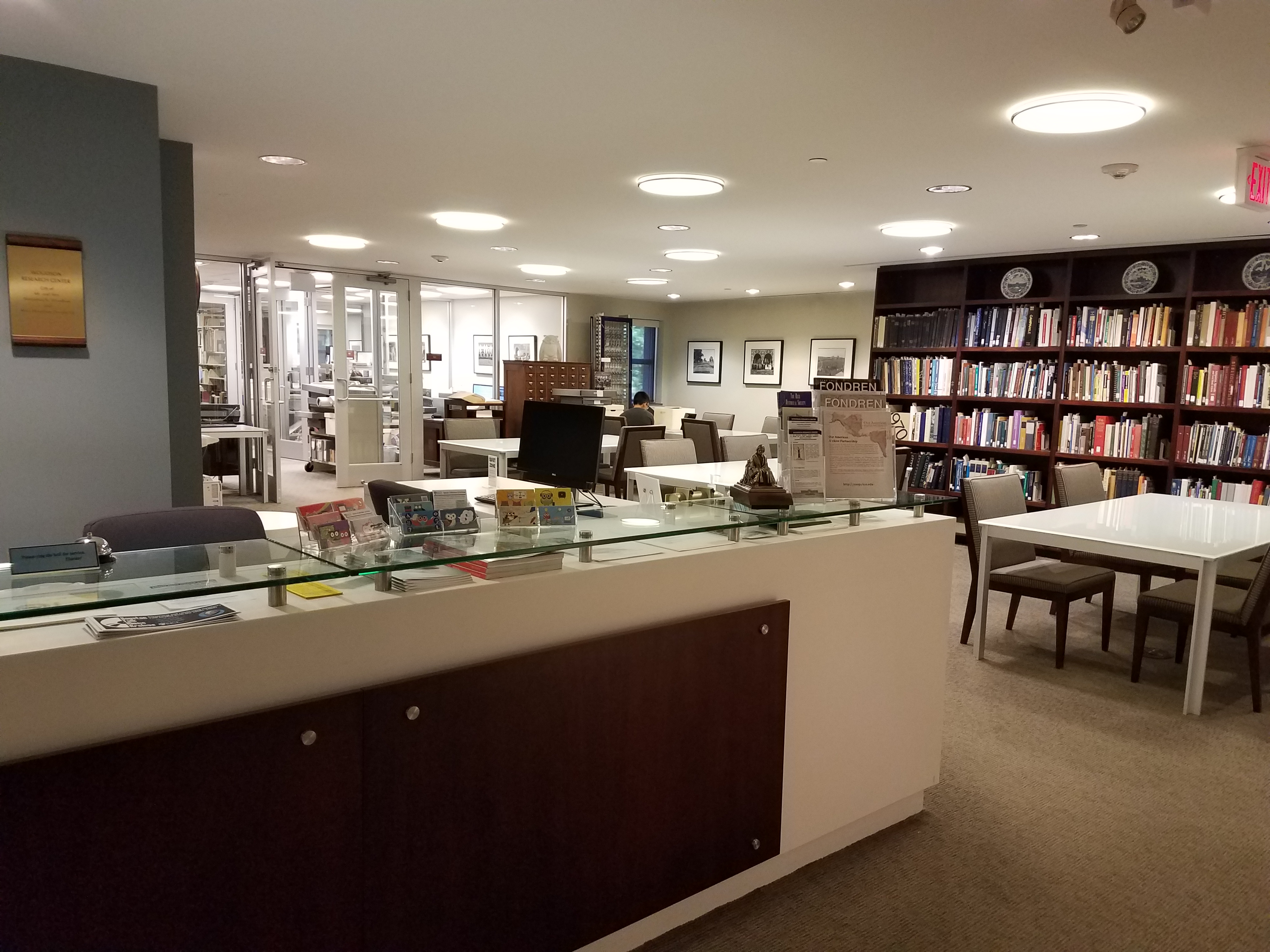
The reading room of the Woodson Research Center

Woodson Research Center is an archive located in Fondren Library at Rice University in Houston, Texas. The Center is named for Benjamin N. Woodson and houses the special collections of Rice University's Fondren Library which includes manuscript collections, rare books, and the Rice University archives. Within the manuscript collections, there are archives focused on specific collecting areas, which include the Houston Asian American Archive, the Houston Folk Music Archive, and the Houston Jewish History Archive.

== Manuscript collections ==
The Woodson contains more than 700 manuscript collections focused on the history of Texas and the greater Houston area, politics, entrepreneurship, oil and gas, theater, architecture. Other subject areas include American Civil War history, hip hop/rap music-related materials from the Swishahouse record label, science, and literary authors with Rice connections. Also in the Center are the papers of Rice University faculty members and alumni with achievements in the humanities, sciences, engineering, and the arts.

The Americas collection documents the 19th and 20th century political and cultural relationships between North, Central, and South America.

20th century materials include the papers and oral histories of Texas liberal Democratic politicians; the papers of the author of the Marshall Plan, William L. Clayton; Oveta Culp Hobby papers, Larry McMurtry and Diana Ossana papers, Gus Wortham family and business papers; Jesse H. Jones personal papers and corporate records; Brown and Root company records; the papers of the scientist Julian Huxley, his wife Juliette Huxley, and his brother Aldous Huxley. The Woodson holds papers of such prominent Texas families as Autry, Fondren, Hamman, Hutcheson, Lovett, Masterson, Sharp, Townsend and Watkin. Oil and gas related collections include Panhandle Eastern and several smaller companies.

The Woodson collects architectural records with collections from Anderson Todd, Arthur E. Jones, Charles Tapley, Brochsteins Inc., and Ralph Anderson Jr., and Weber-Staub-Briscoe architectural ironwork.

Fine Arts has also become a large focus of their collecting efforts. This includes collections from the Contemporary Arts Museum Houston, Ann Holmes, William Camfield, Elinor Evans, and Stages Repertory Theatre.

=== Houston African American Archive ===
As part of a 2-year grant funded Council on Library and Information Resources (CLIR) project “Digitizing hidden selections of Houston's African American and Jewish heritage,” Woodson Research Center will provide public access to collections highlighting the history and experiences of the African-American community in and near Houston, which in turn shed light on nationally significant issues including politics, art, race, and religion. Included in this project are the anniversary booklets and bulletins from Wheeler Avenue Baptist Church from the papers of Reverend William Alexander Lawson (1929- ), the founding Pastor of Wheeler Avenue Baptist Church located in Houston, Texas. More than 200 of the Lawson sermon recordings, dating from 1996-2004, have already been digitized from their original audio-cassettes.

=== Houston Asian American Archive ===
Founded and managed by The Chao Center for Asian Studies (CCAS) at Rice University, the Houston Asian American Archive (HAAA) is housed at the Woodson Research Center. This archive intends to piece together the Asian American experience in Houston. It includes oral histories with Asian Americans in the Houston area recorded by Rice University students. The archive also contains collections from various members and groups from the Houston Asian American community, like the Houston chapter of the Chinese American Citizens Alliance.

=== Houston Folk Music Archive ===
Started in 2016, the Houston Folk Music Archive documents the history of folk music from the 1960s-1980s. The archive contains collections from Wheatfield, Richard Dobson, Vince Bell, Lynn Langham, George Ensle, Don Sanders, David Rodriguez, Sara Hickman, as well as collections that document music venues in the city, such as: Rockefeller's, Anderson Fair Retail Restaurant, Liberty Hall, and Sand Mountain Coffee House. In addition to archival collections, the archive conducts oral histories with members of the folk music community.

=== Houston Jewish History Archive ===
A collaboration between the Program in Jewish Studies at Rice University and the Woodson Research Center, the Houston Jewish History Archive (HJHA) collects and preserves materials from the Houston and South Texas Jewish community. Following Hurricane Harvey Dr. Joshua Furman and Dr. Melissa Kean helped to rescue historical items damaged by the flood waters. These archival materials serve the basis of this growing archive.

== Rare books ==
Particular subject strengths include the history of science, Confederate imprints, Texana, 18th century British drama, the history of aeronautics, and a historical atlas collection. Large collections of note are the Masterson Texana collection, the Axson collection of 18th century plays, and the Anderson collection on the history of aeronautics. The Cruikshank collection offers a wealth of Cruikshank's illustrations from the 1800s. The Woodson houses the Ricketts and Shannon collection of 19th century printing arts, the Stevenson collection of printing and watermarks, the Wilson collection of historical maps and atlases, and the Hirsch Limited Editions Club Collection of fine books.

== University archives ==
The William Ward Watkin and Annie Ray Watkin University archives contain the historical records of the University's Board of Governors, administrative offices, the papers of Rice presidents, university committees, academic departments, student organizations and university-related groups. The archives also contain campus plans, drawings and blueprints, photographs, publications, video and audio tapes, ephemeral material and memorabilia.

== Digital materials ==
The Woodson Research Center has a large amount of digitized material online. Historical images of Rice University, its buildings, people, and events are online in the university's institutional repository. There are also digitized materials in the institutional repository related to items from their cultural heritage collections. The Woodson maintains an array of digital exhibits on a variety of topics: Jesse H. Jones, Liberty Hall, the Houston Folk Music Archive, the Houston Asian American Archive, and many others. Through the Fondren Fellows program, participating students have used Woodson Research Center materials and ArcGIS software to tell new stories and extract data from archival materials related to the U.S. Civil War. One project focused on mapping Civil War narratives and another focused on mapping data from Civil War journals.

== See also ==
- Archives of the Impossible, housed at Woodson
