= Fondren Library =

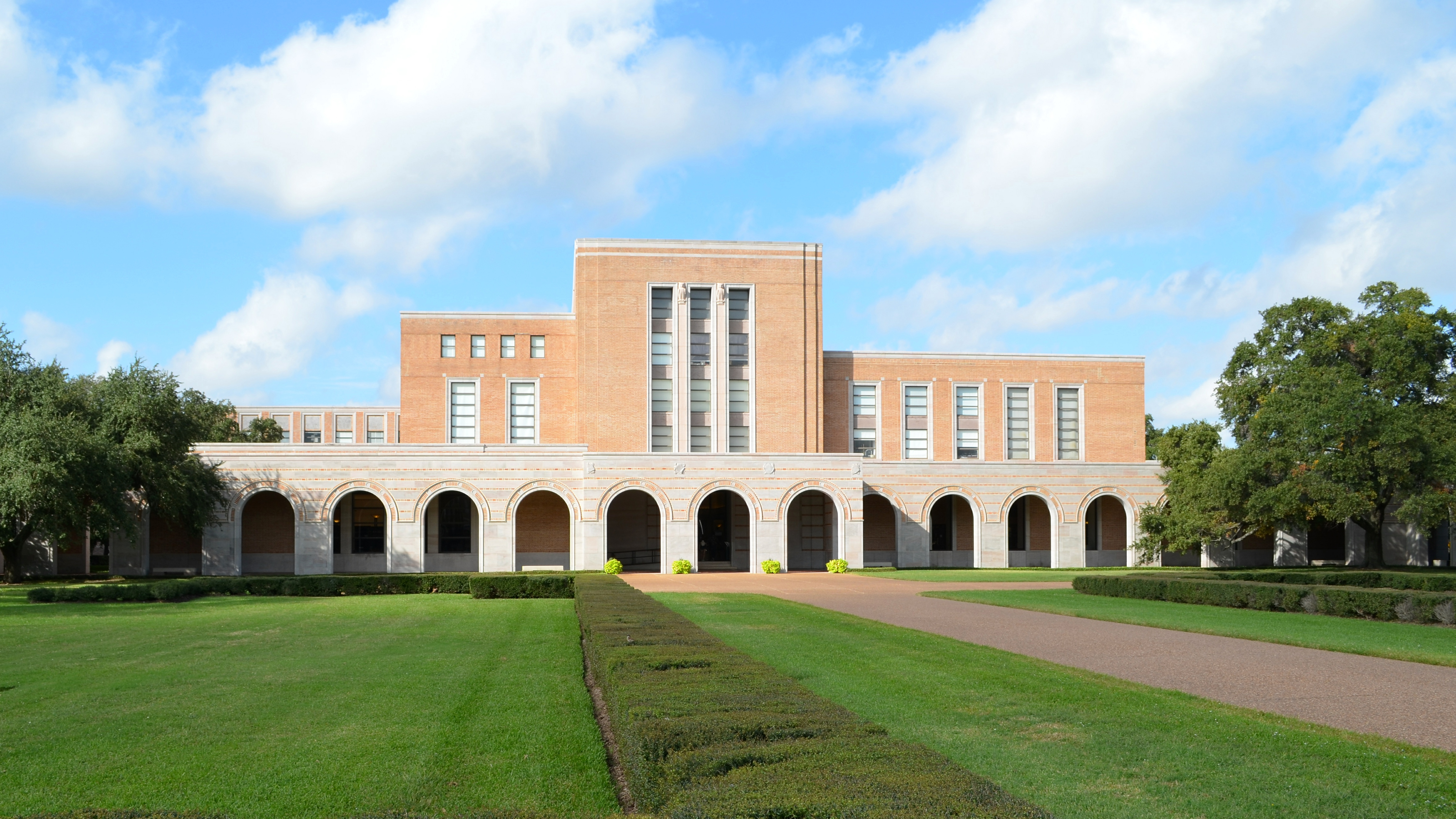
- Fondren Library on the campus of Rice University
- 29.718°N 95.400°W
- Location: Houston, Texas, United States

Fondren Library is the main library of Rice University in Houston, Texas. The library is named for Walter W. Fondren, a co-founder of the Humble Oil & Refining Company, whose family donated $1 million in 1946 for construction of the library. The building was designed by Houston architect John F. Staub and was notable for its open stack arrangement and art deco influence in the architecture. The library was dedicated on November 4, 1949. The library celebrated its 60th birthday in 2009.

An addition to the back of the building in 1969, formally known as the Graduate Research Wing, added 99,000 square feet (9,200 m^{2}) of research space including study rooms, stacks space, and space for the library's special collections, the Woodson Research Center (named for Benjamin Woodson). In December 1997, the Hobby Foundation designated $21.4 million specifically for improvements in Fondren Library. This gift allowed for additional space planning including the building in 2004 of the Library Service Center, a high-density offsite shelving facility that houses less-used materials in a climate-controlled environment. In 2005-06, Fondren underwent an extensive renovation creating access through the entire library, a new first-floor Hobby Information commons, and a Rice-only study space on the sixth floor with dynamic views of the campus.

== Mission statement ==
The mission statement is as follows: "The mission of the Fondren Library of Rice University is to support the highest aspirations of the University in the areas of research, teaching, and service, through innovative research and information services, access to scholarly resources, collaborative alliances, and provision and shared use of physical and virtual spaces."

== Collections ==
Fondren Library currently subscribes to more than 141,000 journals in multiple formats and houses more than 2.8 million print volumes and 3 million microforms. The library is a selective depository of U.S. and Texas government publications and a depository for U.S. patents and trademarks. Woodson Research Center contains more than 475 manuscript collections with emphasis on Texas, Houston, history, science, and English literature.

Woodson contains more than 475 manuscript collections focused on the history of Texas and the greater Houston area, politics, entrepreneurship, and oil and gas. Other subject areas include American Civil War history, hip hop/rap music-related materials from the Swishahouse record label, science, and literary authors with Rice connections. Also in the Center are the papers of Rice University faculty members and alumni with achievements in the humanities, sciences, engineering, and the arts. Woodson also contains substantial materials related to the composer Francis Poulenc, the biologist Julian Huxley, and the Houston businessman and politician Jesse H. Jones.
