= The Secret of Skinwalker Ranch =

American reality television series

- Genre: Reality
- Created by: Joel Patterson; Kevin Burns
- Narrated by: Robert Clotworthy
- Country of origin: United States
- Original language: English
- No. of seasons: 7
- No. of episodes: 86 (list of episodes)

Production
- Executive producers: Kevin Burns (2019); Brandon Fugal (2019-present); Joel Patterson (2019-present); Matt Crocco (2020-present); Mark Marinaccio (2020 - 2021)
- Camera setup: Multiple
- Running time: 60 minutes
- Production companies: Prometheus Entertainment; Letter 10 Productions

Original release
- Network: History
- Release: March 31, 2020 – present

Related
- The Curse of Oak Island; Beyond Skinwalker Ranch

The Secret of Skinwalker Ranch (titled The Curse of Skinwalker Ranch in the UK) is a multi-season reality television series that follows a team investigating Skinwalker Ranch, located in Uintah County, Utah, United States. The show began airing on the History Channel in March 2020 and to date has run for seven seasons. Season Seven premiered May 19, 2026.

In 2026, a Utah film incentive was approved for potentially filming an eighth season in Uintah County.

== Overview ==
The series is set at Skinwalker Ranch, a 500-acre ranch that is the site of purported paranormal and UFO-related activities, and follows a team of investigators and skeptics investigating the reports. Team members include Brandon Fugal, the ranch's owner, and aerospace engineer Travis S. Taylor.

The show features the team utilizing technologies such as ground-penetrating radar to investigate purported anomalies such as ionizing radiation, dire wolves, UFOs and cattle mutilation. The Pentagon UFO videos are also frequently featured. Guests on the show include SETI scientist Seth Shostak, journalist Linda Moulton-Howe, Colonel John B. Alexander, former Governor of Utah Gary Herbert, Utah senator Mike Lee, Attorney General of Utah Sean Reyes, Lunasonde CEO Jeremiah Pate, and others.

Season four premiered with Travis Taylor revealing that he had secretly been working as chief scientist on the Unidentified Aerial Phenomena Task Force (UAPTF).

== Cast members ==
Name	Title	The Secret of Skinwalker Ranch							Beyond Skinwalker Ranch		
Name	Title	Season 1 2020	Season 2 2021	Season 3 2022	Season 4 2023	Season 5 2024	Season 6 2025	Season 7 2026	Series 1 2023	Series 2 2024	Series 3 2025
Travis S. Taylor	Aerospace engineer	Main									
Erik Bard	Principal investigator	Main									
Bryant "Dragon" Arnold	Security chief	Main						Main			
Tom Winterton	Ranch superintendent	Main									
Jim Segala	Scientist	Main						Guest			
Brandon Fugal	Owner of Skinwalker Ranch	Recurring									
Cameron Fugal	Pilot and Brandons Brother	Guest				Recurring					
Jim Morse	Ranch Manager	Recurring				Guest					
Tom Lewis	Ranch caretaker	Recurring				Guest					
Kandus Linde	Anthropologist / Ranch caretaker	Recurring				Guest					
Kaleb Bench	Security	Recurring				Main					
Seth Shostak	SETI	Guest							Guest		
Linda Moulton-Howe	Investigative Journalist	Guest						Guest			
Ryan Skinner	Author of Digging Into Skinwalker		Guest					Guest			
Cameron Prince	Founder of Tesla Universe		Guest		Guest			Recurring	Guest		Guest
Casey Smith	Qal-Tek Radiation Expert		Guest					Recurring	Guest		
Ariel Bar Tzadok	Rabbi		Guest								
John B. Alexander	Colonel		Guest					Guest			
James Keenan	Former military specialist		Guest			Recurring					
Jenn Rook	Station manager and radio DJ at KCUA			Guest							
Gary Herbert	Former Governor			Guest							
George Knapp	television journalist			Guest							
Sean Reyes	Attorney General of Utah				Guest						
Jim Royston	CEO of Omniteq					Main					
Mocean Melvin	Narrator								Main		
Andy Bustamante	Ex–CIA Intelligence Officer								Main		
Paul Beban	Investigative Journalist								Main		
John Bradshaw	Bob Brandshaw's Son								Guest		
Mason Bradshaw	Bob Brandshaw's Grandson								Guest		
Robert Leonard	Terra Exploration Group								Guest		

== Development ==
The series was developed by Letter 10 Productions and the producers of The Curse of Oak Island for the History Channel, which green-lit the show for air in 2019. The first season premiered on March 31, 2020, and ran for eight episodes, concluding on June 2, 2020. A second season was greenlit and began airing on May 4, 2021. Season 3 followed with more publicity on January 26, 2022. Season 4 premiered April 18, 2023. Season 5 premiered April 23, 2024. Season 6 premiered June 3, 2025. Season 7 premiered in May 2026, and Season 8 was renewed for 2027.

== Reception ==
Jason Colavito, an American author who studies fringe theories, characterized the myths about the ranch as "entirely a modern creation, fabricated in the late twentieth century". He described the Secret of Skinwalker Ranch series as "a slow-paced effort to reproduce Curse of Oak Island", a show that had been running since 2014 on the same network.

Science writer Russell Moul criticized the show as presenting no actual evidence to support claims about the ranch. According to Moul, "The show is presented as attempting to bring a scientific approach to prove the existence of all the things that have apparently occurred at the ranch. And while it may be very entertaining to watch and has caused much excitement on social media, the team have yet to provide anything to back up their supposed experiences."

== Episodes ==
=== Series overview ===
Season	Episodes	Originally released		Viewers (millions)
Season	Episodes	First released	Last released	Viewers (millions)
1	8	March 31, 2020	June 2, 2020	15.2
2	10	May 4, 2021	July 13, 2021	TBA
3	11	May 3, 2022	July 19, 2022	TBA
4	15	April 18, 2023	August 8, 2023	TBA
5	14	April 23, 2024	July 23, 2024	TBA
6	14	June 3, 2025	September 2, 2025	TBA
7	14	May 19, 2026	August 18, 2026	TBA
8	14	2027	2027	TBA

=== Season 1 (2020) ===
No. overall	No. in series	Title	Original release date	Viewers (millions)
1	1	"Bad Things Happen When You Dig"	31 March 2020	2.7
Travis Taylor joins a tight-knit group of people dedicated to investigating the ranch.
2	2	"Night Visions"	7 April 2020	2.1
When the team investigates beneath the ranch, they claim to experience karma.
3	3	"Looking Down"	14 April 2020	1.9
Tom Winterton's headache forces the team to re-evaluate the plan; human bone in the basement at Homestead 2.
4	4	"High Strangeness"	21 April 2020	2.1
The team witnesses a double UFO in the sky while performing experiments with weather balloons.
5	5	"Dangerous Curves"	28 April 2020	1.7
New tests reveal that the team must dig. Brandon Fugal concedes.
6	6	"Poking The Nest"	12 May 2020	1.7
Travis claims to be attacked by "Ionizing radiation" when he opens an old sewer at Homestead 2. The team claims that Alpacas brought in for experiments are attacked by "dire wolves". Everyone's iPhones react in strange ways.
7	7	"Surveillance"	19 May 2020	1.5
A Cow's mutilation makes the team bring Brandon on-site. Guest Star Linda Moulton-Howe
8	8	"Revelations"	2 June 2020	1.5
A flashback on the year; Strange, unidentified peeping toms.

=== Season 2 (2021) ===
No. overall	No. in series	Title	Original release date	Viewers (millions)
9	1	"Breaking Ground"	4 May 2021	7.1
Returning to what they had done in 2020, Travis rejoins the team and this episode they dig at Homestead 2.
10	2	"Carved In Stone"	11 May 2021	7.1
A guest investigator tells the team there are some bizarre rock carvings depicting the mesa in an unexplored area. A new investigator takes a new look at season 1's "cattle mutilation" but it is a brown cow, not a black one.
11	3	"Laser Focused"	18 May 2021	N/A
An ex-military personnel officer tells the team about a disturbing phenomena from his experience. The team decides to conduct a laser experiment at Homestead 2.
12	4	"There's No Place Like Homestead Two"	25 May 2021	N/A
A lidar scan reveals a dark mass at the bottom of Homestead two. This startles the team, so they bring Rabbi Ariel Bar Tzadok to the ranch, but while he's there, a UFO sighting is made at the command center. Guest Star Rabbi Ariel Bar Tzadok
13	5	"The Ranch Strikes Back"	8 June 2021	N/A
The team remakes the Rabbi's experiment, only this time with thermal imaging. The team claims their injuries are caused by the ranch taking revenge.
14	6	"Skin Deep"	15 June 2021	N/A
A new investigator shows the team a new cavern system circulating underneath the ranch.
15	7	"Can You Dig It?"	22 June 2021	N/A
The team proceeds with the drilling operation in the newly-discovered Triangle Area. They claim to find dangerously high energy levels and "an object from beyond".
16	8	"Shocking Revelations"	29 June 2021	N/A
The team discovers that the soil of the ranch is highly conductive when they experiment with Tesla coils.
17	9	"Look, Up In The Sky"	6 July 2021	N/A
The team claims to see UAPs immediately after high-tech rockets are shot into the ranch's atmosphere, just a mile into what is known as the "high zone".
18	10	"It Follows"	13 July 2021	N/A
On the season finale, the team claims that a strange body has caused a malfunction with the ground monitor in Brandon’s helicopter . The season finale ends with Travis driving home in his new red Jeep.

=== Season 3 (2022) ===
No. overall	No. in series	Title	Original release date	Viewers (millions)
19	1	"Above and Beyond Explanation"	3 May 2022	N/A
The team resumes for the third time their research in 2021 and attempt to tie evidence between the mile-high zone and the mesa.
20	2	"Tic Tac 2"	10 May 2022	N/A
The team invites government officials from the original Tic Tac incident to the ranch and claim they have simulated a similar event.
21	3	"Inner Fear-Ence"	17 May 2022	N/A
As new aerial experiments are underway at the triangle area, the team claims to have discovered evidence that radiation and UAP phenomena are stimulated by below ground anomalies in the mesa.
22	4	"Scoped Out"	24 May 2022	N/A
The team claims to witness UAPs when astronomers work at the triangle area.
23	5	"Digging Up the Past"	7 June 2022	N/A
Former NIDS employee, retired Army Colonel John Alexander, visits the ranch, who claims that an experiment "may have opened a portal". The team claim they have received a mysterious signal they interpret as an attempt to communicate.
24	6	"Where There’s Smoke…"	14 June 2022	N/A
While the team digs up a cave system beneath the ranch, they also broadcast what they describe as "an alien sound effect" on the local radio station.
25	7	"Full Metal Mesa"	21 June 2022	N/A
While drilling, the team say they find a void containing "an impenetrable object".
26	8	"Dome of the Rock"	28 June 2022	N/A
The team recover metal fragments from what they claim is "a massive dome buried in the mesa" on Skinwalker Ranch.
27	9	"Closer Encounters"	5 July 2022	N/A
The team conducts an ambitious experiment at the Triangle.
28	10	"Photo Finish"	12 July 2022	N/A
The team performs a three-dimensional scan of Skinwalker Ranch.
29	11	"The Strangest Things So Far"	19 July 2022	N/A
The team reviews all the experiences and evidence of the last three years.

=== Season 4 (2023) ===
No. overall	No. in series	Title	Original release date	Viewers (millions)
30	1	"Over and Out of This World"	17 April 2023	N/A
Brandon Fugal and his team return with Travis Taylor to continue “the most interesting science experiment of our time”.
31	2	"Who’s Your Data"	24 April 2023	N/A
The team conducts a drone light experiment above the Triangle they claim indicates activity in the mesa.
32	3	"The Blob"	2 May 2023	N/A
The team claims to have discovered metallic objects beneath the Mesa and conducts an experiment.
33	4	"The Watchers"	8 May 2023	N/A
The team claims to find more evidence of something buried in the mesa. Brandon returns to the ranch with Utah's Attorney General Sean Reyes.
34	5	"Here’s The Drill"	15 May 2023	N/A
The team begins drilling at the Mesa and conducts new experiments at the Triangle.
35	6	"What A Mesa"	22 May 2023	N/A
The team drills into the Mesa on Skinwalker Ranch.
36	7	"The Return"	5 June 2023	N/A
A former ranch investigator and government official return.
37	8	"Between the Lines"	12 June 2023	N/A
A new, subsurface investigation leads to a discovery near Homestead Two.
38	9	"Something's Up"	19 June 2023	N/A
The team perform a radar experiment above the Mesa and Triangle.
39	10	"A Frequency Occurrence"	26 June 2023	N/A
Multi-tribal Native Americans perform a drum ceremony. The team find the results interesting.
40	11	"In the Heat of the Night"	10 July 2023	N/A
The team uses aerial LIDAR above the triangle. They are baffled by the results.
41	12	"In and Out"	17 July 2023	N/A
After more rocket and helicopter experiments, the team feel the result is a phenomenon which might prove an ancient legend.
42	13	"Everything in the Air All at Once"	24 July 2023	N/A
The team conducts complex experiments at the Triangle, and claim a number of events are bizarre.
43	14	"Living in a Metamaterial World"	1 August 2023	N/A
The team makes further experiments and say they reveal more evidence of activity in the skies above the ranch. The team feels they have discovered anomalies underground.
44	15	"Looking Back and Far Beyond"	8 August 2023	N/A
Clips show recapping the most important and interesting discoveries of the series thus far.

=== Season 5 (2024) ===
No. overall	No. in series	Title	Original release date	Viewers (millions)
45	1	"What's Up?"	23 April 2024	N/A
46	2	"Holey Cow"	30 April 2024	N/A
47	3	"Dead In The Water"	7 May 2024	N/A
48	4	"Bad Taste"	14 May 2024	N/A
49	5	"The Flash"	21 May 2024	N/A
50	6	"Beaming Up"	4 June 2024	N/A
51	7	"The Cone Zone"	11 June 2024	N/A
52	8	"Graves Concern"	18 June 2024	N/A
53	9	"Spinning Out"	25 June 2024	N/A
54	10	"What the Gel?"	2 July 2024	N/A
55	11	"Bad to the Drone"	9 July 2024	N/A
56	12	"Drone-Ageddon"	16 July 2024	N/A
57	13	"The Breakthrough"	23 July 2024	N/A
58	14	"Shock and Awe"	23 July 2024	N/A

=== Season 6 (2025) ===
No. overall	No. in series	Title	Original release date	Viewers (millions)
59	1	"Bubble Trouble"	3 June 2025	N/A
60	2	"The Drone Zone"	10 June 2025	N/A
61	3	"Smoke It Out"	17 June 2025	N/A
62	4	"Bursting the Bubble"	24 June 2025	N/A
63	5	"Pushing Boundaries"	1 July 2025	N/A
64	6	"Posting Up"	8 July 2025	N/A
65	7	"Lights Out"	15 July 2025	N/A
66	8	"Swarm Weather"	22 July 2025	N/A
67	9	"Darting Around"	29 July 2025	N/A
68	10	"Hard Target"	5 August 2025	N/A
69	11	"Hard To Handle"	12 August 2025	N/A
70	12	"Hard Boiled"	19 August 2025	N/A
71	13	"Fire In The Holes"	26 August 2025	N/A
72	14	"Meeting of the Minds"	2 September 2025	N/A

=== Season 7 (2026) ===
No. overall	No. in series	Title	Original release date	Viewers (millions)
73	1	"All Fired Up"	19 May 2026	N/A
74	2	"Flying High"	26 May 2026	N/A
75	3	"Setting Boundaries"	2 June 2026	N/A
76	4	"Smoking Guns"	9 June 2026	N/A
77	5	"Home Sweet Homestead"	16 June 2026	N/A
78	6	"All Mesa'd Up"	23 June 2026	N/A
79	7	"High Voltage"	30 June 2026	N/A
80	8	"Rocket Men"	7 July 2026	N/A
81	9	"Up in Smoke"	14 July 2026	N/A
82	10	"The Twilight Zones"	21 July 2026	N/A
83	11	"On the Radar"	28 July 2026	N/A
84	12	"Hot Pursuit"	4 August 2026	N/A
85	13	"Heating Up"	11 August 2026	N/A
86	14	"Top Secrets"	18 August 2026	N/A

== Beyond Skinwalker Ranch ==
On June 6, 2023, the History Channel added a new series, Beyond Skinwalker Ranch, where investigators such as ex-CIA agent Andy Bustamante and journalist Paul Beban join Erik Bard, Travis Taylor, Dragon and Brandon Fugal to investigate ranches in other parts of the world and compare them to the one in Utah. The first season aired 9 episodes in 2023. A second season of 8 episodes aired June 4, 2024. Season 3 premiered June 3rd, 2025. The program was cancelled after 3 seasons.

=== Season 1 (2023) ===
No. overall	No. in series	Title	Original release date	Viewers (millions)
1	1	"Bradshaw Ranch"	6 June 2023	N/A
Ex-CIA agent Andy Bustamante teams with journalist Paul Beban to begin an investigation beyond the borders of Skinwalker Ranch- to Sedona, Arizona, where they claim to record temperature anomalies and see a UAP on the UFODap.
2	2	"Mt. Wilson Ranch"	13 June 2023	N/A
Andy and Paul travel to Nevada and a ranch converted into a museum, once owned by Robert Bigelow at the same time as Skinwalker. They use explosives in the snow during a blizzard in a futile attempt to access depressions in the ground.
3	3	"Rocky Mountain Ranch"	20 June 2023	N/A
Katie Page revisits her childhood ranch with Andy and Paul.
4	4	"Thomas Miller Ranch"	27 June 2023	N/A
Andy and Paul visit a Colorado ranch to investigate what they claim are unexplained cattle mutilations.
5	5	"Bradshaw Ranch Pt. 2"	11 July 2023	N/A
Andy and Paul return to investigate Bradshaw Ranch during a wind storm and claim they are being "spied on"
6	6	"Bridgewater Triangle"	18 July 2023	N/A
The boys visit the Bridgewater Triangle area in Massachusetts where they team with Oak Island investigator Matty Blake at Skim Milk Bridge and hear the legend of a shapeshifter known as a Pukwudgie.
7	7	"Navajo Nation"	25 July 2023	N/A
Andy and Paul join Navajo rangers to investigate Skinwalker legends in Utah.
8	8	"Chris Bledsoe"	1 August 2023	N/A
Andy and Paul equip a person they believe is an alien communicator with a brain scan.
9	9	"Batting A Thousand"	August 2023	TBD
Reviewing the missions of 2023 and featuring unseen footage of an encounter with an Owl.

=== Season 2 (2024) ===
No. overall	No. in series	Title	Original release date	Viewers (millions)
10	1	"Skinwalker's Evil Twin"	4 June 2024	N/A
11	2	"Go Bigelow Or Go Home"	11 June 2024	N/A
12	3	"Smoking Gun"	18 June 2024	N/A
13	4	"Ancient Dimensions"	25 June 2024	N/A
14	5	"The Landing Site"	2 July 2024	N/A
15	6	"Tumbleweeds and UAPs"	9 July 2024	N/A
16	7	"Ranch From Hell"	16 July 2024	N/A
17	8	"Beyond the Beyond"	16 July 2024	N/A

=== Season 3 (2025) ===
No. overall	No. in series	Title	Original release date	Viewers (millions)
18	1	"Mountain of Mystery"	3 June 2025	N/A
19	2	"The Ranch Strikes Back"	10 June 2025	N/A
20	3	"Swamp Things"	17 June 2025	N/A
21	4	"Chip Off the Orb Block"	24 June 2025	N/A
22	5	"Purgatory Bridge"	1 July 2025	N/A
23	6	"Pennsylvania's Roswell"	8 July 2025	N/A
24	7	"Bad Energy"	15 July 2025	N/A
25	8	"Inspiring and Terrifying"	22 July 2025	N/A

== See also ==
- List of topics characterized as pseudoscience
- Skinwalker Ranch (film)
