= Albert Stubblebine =

United States Army general (1930–2017)

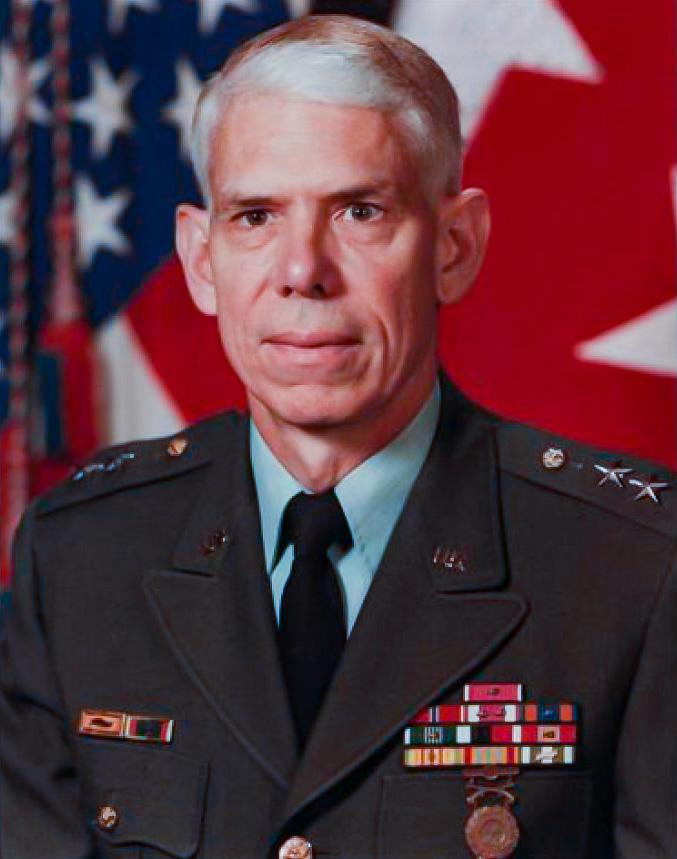
- Stubblebine as a major general, circa 1981
- Born: Albert Newton Stubblebine III; February 6, 1930; Fort Sill, Oklahoma
- Died: February 6, 2017 (aged 87); New Brunswick, New Jersey
- Military career
- Allegiance: United States
- Branch: United States Army
- Service years: 1952–1984 (32 years)
- Rank: Major General
- Nickname: "Bert"
- Commands: U.S. Army Intelligence and Security Command
- Conflicts: Cold War; Vietnam War; Invasion of Grenada
- Awards: Distinguished Service Medal; Legion of Merit (2); Bronze Star; Air Medal (2)

Albert "Bert" Newton Stubblebine III (February 6, 1930 – February 6, 2017) was a United States Army major general whose active-duty career spanned 32 years. Beginning as an armor officer, he later transferred to intelligence. He is credited with redesigning the U.S. Army intelligence architecture during his time as commanding general of the U.S. Army Intelligence and Security Command (INSCOM) from 1981 to '84, after which he retired from active service.

After his retirement, it became widely known that Stubblebine had maintained a keen interest in psychic warfare throughout his service. He sought to develop an army of soldiers with special powers, such as the ability to walk through walls.

== Biography ==
Stubblebine graduated from the United States Military Academy in 1952 and subsequently received an M.S. in chemical engineering from Columbia University in 1961. He married his wife, Geraldine, in 1952; they would ultimately adopt two children. Beginning his military career as an armor officer, he later transferred to military intelligence.

In 1968, Stubblebine was transferred to the staff of the Military Assistance Command, Vietnam and later was assigned to the 25th Infantry Division as its G-2 (intelligence officer). For his service in the Vietnam War, Stubblebine was awarded the Legion of Merit and the Bronze Star Medal.

As a colonel, Stubblebine participated in a special task force that defined the requirements of the U.S. Army for future conflict. By 1980, General Stubblebine commanded the Electronic Research and Development Command (ERADCOM). Stubblebine was strongly influenced by Lieutenant Colonel Jim Channon's New Age-inspired First Earth Battalion Field Manual (1979). Stubblebine became a proponent of psychic warfare and initiated a project within the U.S. Army Intelligence and Security Command (INSCOM), which he commanded from 1981 to 1984, to create "a breed of 'super soldier'" who would "have the ability to become invisible at will and to walk through walls". He attempted to walk through walls himself—but failed, as he himself described in a 2004 interview. (These activities feature prominently in Jon Ronson's 2004 book The Men Who Stare at Goats.)

A key sponsor of the Stargate Project (a remote viewing project) at Fort Meade, Maryland, Stubblebine was convinced of the reality of a wide variety of psychic phenomena. He required that all of his battalion commanders learn how to bend spoons in the manner of celebrity psychic Uri Geller, and he himself attempted several psychic feats, in addition to walking through walls, such as levitation and dispersing distant clouds with his mind. Stubblebine was a key leader in the U.S. military invasion of Grenada (1983). After some controversy involving the experiments with psychic phenomena, Stubblebine took "early retirement" from the Army in 1984. In addition to alleged security violations from uncleared civilian psychics working in Sensitive Compartmented Information Facilities (SCIFs), Stubblebine offended then-U.S. Army Chief of Staff General John Adams Wickham, Jr. by offering to perform a spoon-bending feat at a formal gala; Wickham, a devout Presbyterian, associated such phenomena with Satanism.

Stubblebine's successor as the INSCOM commander was Major General Harry Soyster, who had a reputation as a much more conservative and conventional intelligence officer. Soyster was not amenable to continuing paranormal experiments and the Army's participation in the Stargate Project ended during his tenure, though not until 1995.

After Stubblebine retired from the Army in 1984 he worked as a vice-president for BDM Corporation. He retired from that job in 1990. The same year, he was inducted into the Military Intelligence Hall of Fame. In 1994 his wife Geraldine was granted a divorce on grounds of adultery. Shortly thereafter, he was remarried to psychiatrist Rima E. Laibow. He also acted as a part-time consultant to two government contractors, ERIM and Space Applications Corporation.

== Conspiracy theories ==
Stubblebine, whose interests included UFOs and parapsychology, was a member of the Oath Keepers. He and his second wife Rima Laibow were active in the Patriot movement, and appeared together as guests on The Alex Jones Show. Stubblebine and Laibow established a nonprofit organization called "Natural Solutions Foundation" which disseminated conspiracy theories about vaccinations, pharmaceutical companies and genetically modified foods.

=== September 11 attacks ===
Stubblebine believed that an airplane did not crash into the Pentagon in the September 11 terrorist attacks, but said he did not know what did. According to Stubblebine, after analyzing the damage done to The Pentagon by the hijacked aircraft during the attacks, he concluded that an "airplane did not make that hole". Stubblebine's statements have been cited by philosophy professor and 9/11 conspiracy theorist David Ray Griffin.

=== H1N1 flu ===
In 2009, Stubblebine said he believed the H1N1 swine flu was "a genetically engineered virus that is part of a World Health Organization-United Nations-United States scheme to sterilize untold numbers of people".

== In popular culture ==
- A character ("General Hopgood") in the 2009 film The Men Who Stare at Goats — a fictionalized adaptation of Ronson's book — is loosely based on Stubblebine as commander of the "psychic spy unit" (portrayed in the film) who believed he could train himself to walk through walls.

== See also ==
- Remote viewing
