= Super soldier =

Concept soldier with superhuman abilities

Cover of Captain America Comics #1, which introduced Captain America punching Adolf Hitler, generally considered the first fictional super soldier. Art by Joe Simon and Jack Kirby.

A super soldier or supersoldier, is a concept soldier capable of operating beyond normal human abilities, usually through permanent artificial enhancements such as genetic modification or technological integration. The super soldier has been a common trope in military science fiction and superhero fiction since the mid-20th century, but it is also used in contemporary discussion of future military human enhancement (often with dystopian connotations).

== History ==
Weapons and other technologies have long been used to enhance the capabilities of soldiers. Sometimes this would include changes to the soldiers themselves, as in the case of war paint or the coca leaves used by Inca warriors to stay alert. However, it was only in the American Revolutionary War that scientific modifications began in the form of vaccinations to enhance the immune system. An urban legend concerning soldiers with vastly superior abilities arose in the 1920s claiming that the Soviet Union under Joseph Stalin sought to genetically engineer a pain-resistant human–ape hybrid that would be harder to kill.

In 1940, the first fictional super soldier appeared with the publication of the first Captain America comic. In the comics, a frail man named Steven Rogers joins the US Army during World War II and is given an experimental "super-soldier serum", turning him into Captain America.

Stimulants such as amphetamines have been widely used since at least WWII to enhance or maintain the performance of soldiers. Amphetamines are known to improve wakefulness, mood and concentration, but they come with negative side effects and have been blamed for the impaired judgement of two US Air Force pilots who bombed a Canadian unit in Afghanistan in 2002.

As detailed in the book The Men Who Stare at Goats and its accompanying documentary series, there was a movement within the US Army from at least the late 1970s to the early 1980s to harness untapped (chiefly psychic) human powers. Together with the exploitation of new technologies, the vision was a military unit of super soldiers called the First Earth Battalion. Officers within this movement believed some of them were capable of supernatural feats such as remote viewing or even stopping the heart of a goat by staring at it.

== Current military efforts ==
In recent years, a number of countries have expressed more ambitious intentions to develop enhanced soldiers, including the US, UK and France. As of 2011, the US Pentagon spent around $400 million per year researching soldier enhancements. A number of these countries have said they must explore the development of soldier enhancements in response to other militaries doing the same. In 2025, the US National Security Commission on Emerging Biotechnology claimed China is likely working on genetically engineered super soldiers.

=== Physical enhancement ===
The UK's Defence and Security Accelerator has offered funding for "Generation-After-Next (GAN) human augmentation" which may include "enhancing physical and/or psychological performance", for example by improving endurance or recovery using implantable devices, synthetic biology, drugs, or wearable devices such as exoskeletons. As a concrete example of the latter, Sarcos Robotics, formerly part of Raytheon, has worked closely with the US military to develop full-body robotic exoskeletons like the Guardian XO, which allows one to lift 90 kg as if it were 4.5 kg.

In 2016, Japanese scientists identified a protein in tardigrades that helps them resist radiation and has the same effect on human cells. In 2023, the South China Morning Post claimed Chinese military scientists increased the radiation resistance of human embryonic stem cells by inserting a gene from tardigrades, and that the scientists said this "could lead to super-tough soldiers who could survive nuclear fallout."

=== Cognitive enhancement ===
US military research has considered several methods of cognitive enhancement, such as various types of transcranial stimulation and augmented reality. Transcranial direct current stimulation (tDCS) has proved to significantly improve target detection in air traffic control simulations and performance in flight simulations. Repetitive transcranial magnetic stimulation (rTMS) can also boost performance in short-term memory tasks.

=== Sensory enhancement ===
Since 2014, the US Army has been developing the Tactical Communications and Protective System (TCAPS), an earplug that both protects the ears from loud sounds and boosts soft noises. In 2018, the US Department of Defense offered funding for vision enhancement research that could enable faster target detection.

== Future projections ==
In 2019, the US Army Combat Capabilities Development Command Chemical Biological Center (DEVCOM CBC) released a report entitled Cyborg Soldier 2050: Human/Machine Fusion and the Implications for the Future of the DOD. The report explores visual, muscular, auditory and neural enhancements it views as "technically feasible by 2050 or earlier." It identifies the latter as particularly revolutionary for combat, involving not only communication with autonomous weapon systems, but brain-to-brain interactions and "read/write capability between humans and machines". The report talks about the need to control public perception of these technologies, while also stating that its development will likely be driven by civilian demand. It predicts that beyond 2050 these technologies will accelerate inequalities and clash with established legal and ethical frameworks.

In 2021, the UK Ministry of Defence's Development, Concepts and Doctrine Centre, in partnership with Germany's Bundeswehr Office for Defence Planning, published Human Augmentation – The Dawn of a New Paradigm. The report discusses a number of emerging and potential technologies that could greatly improve human capabilities, both on and off the battlefield, and their potential implications for defence and society, including the rise of super soldiers. It suggests that human augmentation will primarily be limited by public opinion, which will become more accepting of it over time, although elements of society may continue to resist it, drawing a parallel with resistance to vaccination. Paul Cornish, a visiting professor at LSE IDEAS, criticized the report for overlooking free will in its conceptualization of humans as platforms and for advocating that governments steer progress in human augmentation without regard to ethicists or public opinion.

In 2018, neuroscientist E. Paul Zehr published Chasing Captain America: How Advances in Science, Engineering and Biotechnology will produce a Superhuman for a lay audience. Zehr suggests some super soldier capabilities may only be a few years or decades away, but thinks giving many of them to a single person could have significant negative effects.

== Fiction ==
Just as space travel is the archetypal sci-fi subject, so superheroes are the archetypal comic-book subject. The military subgenre of SF may be focused on space warfare, but its comic-book counterpart centres on the super-soldier.

— Andrew May, Rockets and Ray Guns: The Sci-Fi Science of the Cold War

In ancient times, the myth of Achilles and demigods, were considered "super soldiers" whose enhancements mostly came from the Gods rather than science and technology. One of, if not the most popular example of a fictional super soldier is Captain America. Captain America (otherwise known as Steven "Steve" Rogers), created by Joe Simon and Jack Kirby, made his first debut in 1940 in the comic Captain America Comics #1, as the first fictional super soldier via technology, which has now become common in military science fiction and superhero fiction. Other known examples of super soldiers in fiction are the X-Men, Iron Man, Master Chief, Captain Nazi, Overlord (2018 film), S.S. Doomtrooper, Soldier (The Outer Limits), Luc Deveraux of the Universal Soldier film series, Sergeant Todd "3465" from Soldier, Star Trek Eugenics Wars, Rogar Dana from "The Hunted" episode of Star Trek: The Next Generation, the Clone troopers from Star Wars, the titular Starship Troopers, Soldier Boy from The Boys, and the three super soldiers from Onslaught.

The super soldier concept is also popular in tabletop and video games. The Space Marines of the Warhammer 40,000 series are an example of game-based fictional super soldiers. A study by Dr. Mike Ryder from the Lancaster University Management School examined their physical alteration and separation from ordinary human life, and questions of issues such as obedience and ethics, arising from their depiction.

A common theme in the genre is the super soldier often cannot return to their past lives and society due to these enhancements.

== See also ==
- Clone trooper
- Congenital analgesia
- Cyborg
- Future Soldier
- Human enhancement
- Hysterical strength
- Posthuman
- Space marine
- Superhero
- Superhuman
- Transhumanism
- Übermensch
