= John B. Alexander =

United States Army colonel (born 1937)

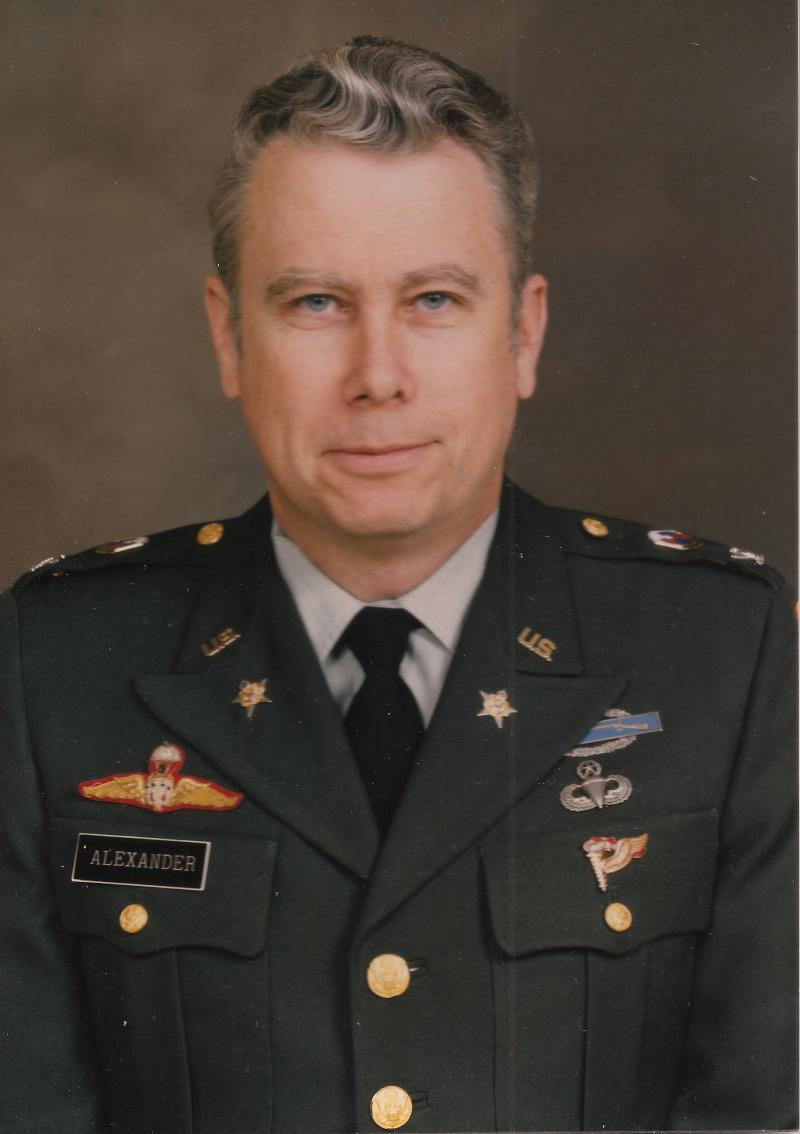
- Col. John B. Alexander
- Born: 1937 (age 88–89)
- Occupations: Author and UFO researcher
- Website: johnbalexander.com

John B. Alexander (born 1937) is a retired United States Army colonel. An infantry officer for much of his career, he is best known as a leading advocate for the development of non-lethal weapons and of military applications of the paranormal. He has written and lectured on UFOs. He characterizes his career as having "evolved from hard-core mercenary to thanatologist". Alexander figures prominently in journalist Jon Ronson's book The Men Who Stare At Goats (2004), which was later made into a Hollywood film starring George Clooney (2009). Ronson continued to draw on Alexander's former status and knowledge in several related Channel 4 documentaries, where Ronson examined the subject of New Age ideas influencing the U.S. military.

== Biography ==
Alexander was born in New York in 1937. He enlisted in the Army as a private in 1956, ultimately retiring as a colonel in 1988. A "mustang," Alexander was selected to attend Officer Candidate School as a sergeant first class and was the honor graduate. While on active duty, he received degrees from the University of Nebraska–Lincoln (B.G.S. with a concentration in sociology, 1971), Pepperdine University (M.A. in education, 1975) and Walden University (Ph.D. in education, 1980). He later attended The MIT Executive Program in Management of Complex Organizations, at the Sloan School of Management at MIT (1991) and The Program for Senior Executives in National and International Security at Harvard University (1993).

His assignments include: Commander, Army Special Forces Teams, US Army, Thailand, Vietnam, 1966–69; Chief of Human Resources Division, US Army, Ft. McPherson, GA, 1977–79; Inspector General, Department of Army, Washington, 1980–82; Chief of Human Technology, Army Intelligence Command, US Army, Arlington, VA 1982–83; Manager of Tech. Integration, Army Materiel Command, US Army, Alexandria, VA, 1983–85; Director, Advanced System Concepts US Army Lab. Command, Aldelphi, MD 1985–88.

Alexander describes his assignment in 1972 as an infantry officer at Schofield Barracks, Hawaii, before which time he went diving in the Bimini Islands in search of the mythological continent of Atlantis. During his career in the Army he showed considerable interest in esoteric techniques with his colleague Lieutenant Colonel Jim Channon in his First Earth Battalion manual. An example is neuro-linguistic programming, with which he hoped to enhance military members similar to "Jedi warriors" (according to his own account in his 1990 book The Warrior's Edge). He has published another book, UFOs: Myths, Conspiracies, and Realities (ISBN 978-0-312-64834-3). As part of his doctoral research, Alexander studied the work of Elisabeth Kübler-Ross and later served as president of the International Association for Near-Death Studies. He also conducted studies on extrasensory perception in dolphins with his former wife, Jan Northup.

From 1982 to 1983, Alexander directly reported to Major General Albert Stubblebine as a self-described "freelance colonel", Alexander was one of Stubblebine's closest colleagues.

After leaving the Army, Alexander joined the Los Alamos National Laboratory, where he served as Project Manager for Non-Lethal Defense. Prior to his departure from the Army, he had headed the Advanced Systems Concepts Office of the U.S. Army Laboratory Command. According to the Joint Special Operations University, Alexander gave briefings on non-lethal warfare to, among others, White House staff, the National Security Council, members of the U.S. Congress, the Director of Central Intelligence, the German Bundestag, and senior officials at the Department of War.Alexander was among the early advocates of increased military use of non-lethal weapons, including electromagnetic pulses, high-power microwaves, acoustic systems, adhesive foams, and means of disrupting vehicles or infrastructure. He organized and chaired conferences on non-lethal warfare and served as the U.S. delegate to several NATO studies on this topic. In 1998, the Council on Foreign Relations listed Alexander as a member of an independent working group on non-lethal weapons technologies.

In 1985, Alexander founded the Advanced Theoretical Physics Project, an informal cadre of "government officials" (including "people from the Army, Navy, and Air Force, plus several from the defense aerospace industries and some members from the Intelligence Community") who "took it upon themselves to find out whether there was a secret federal UFO project." Although Alexander restricted membership in the group to invitees with a demonstrable interest in the phenomenon and a minimum security clearance of Top Secret-SCI at SI-TK in the hope that "those involved [in a black program on UFOs] would probably be willing to work with a group that had appropriate clearances and could help disseminate information," the group ultimately concluded that "there was no program" and that information collection among the military, Intelligence Community and other federal agencies "was pretty much ad hoc."

The Albuquerque Journal reported in March 1993 that "last year, Alexander organized a national conference devoted to researching 'reports of ritual abuse, near-death experiences, human contacts with extraterrestrial aliens and other so-called anomalous experiences.' At the 2011 MUFON Symposium, Alexander's speech on UFOs was jeered by attendees after he denied all government related conspiracies, and all claims of government “silencing” or harassment.

Together with his friend Albert Stubblebine, Alexander served on the board of directors of PSI-TECH in the 1990s, a company that applies so-called psychonautic concepts for military purposes. For example, during the Gulf Wars, the Department of War asked the company to use remote viewing to locate the sites of Saddam Hussein’s Scud missiles. In 1992, the FBI asked PSI-TECH for assistance in the search for a kidnapped Exxon executive.

According to the Joint Special Operations University in Kabul, Alexander served as a mentor to high-ranking officials of the Afghan Ministry of Defense in 2003. This work was carried out as part of the coalition forces’ Office of Military Cooperation–Afghanistan. He has traveled to every continent and, among other things, met with shamans in the Amazon and Voodoo practitioners in Africa.

Alexander lives in Las Vegas, Nevada with his wife Victoria, a fellow UFO researcher. He is a friend of Al Gore. They have known each other since 1983, when Gore took Alexander's course on neurolinguistic programming.

== Works ==
=== Articles ===
- "The New Mental Battlefield: 'Beam Me Up, Spock.'" Military Review, vol. LX, no. 12 (Dec. 1980), pp. 47+. Full issue.

=== Books ===
- The Warrior's Edge (1990), with Richard Groller and Janet Morris. William Morrow & Co.

Discusses meditation, active listening, intuition, visualization, biofeedback, martial arts, and psychokinesis as researched by the U.S. military.

- Future War: Non-Lethal Weapons in Modern Warfare (1999). Thomas Dunne Books. Foreword by Tom Clancy. ISBN 978-0312267391.
- Winning the War: Advanced Weapons, Strategies, and Concepts for the Post-9/11 World (2003). Thomas Dunne Books. ISBN 978-0312306755.
- UFOs: Myths, Conspiracies, and Realities (2011) Thomas Dunne Books. Foreword by Jacques Vallée. Introduction by Burt Rutan.
- Reality Denied: Firsthand Experiences with Things that Can't Happen - But Did (2017). Anomalist Books. Foreword by Uri Geller.

=== Reviews ===
- Review of The UFO Encyclopedia: The Phenomena from the Beginning (3rd ed., 2 vol.) by Jerome Clark. Journal of Scientific Exploration, vol. 34, no. 1 (2020), pp. 137-140. doi:10.31275/20201717.

== In popular culture ==
Alexander is interviewed for the documentary featurette "The Science Behind the Fiction" which appears on the DVD for the 2009 film Push. There he discusses his personal experiences with paranormality within the US military. He claims that the Soviet Typhoon class submarine first became known to American military intelligence by paranormal methods.

== See also ==
- National Institute for Discovery Science
- Skinwalker Ranch
