= Advanced Aerospace Threat Identification Program =

U.S. program to study UFOs (2007–2012)

- Successor: Unidentified Aerial Phenomena Task Force
- Formation: 2007; 19 years ago
- Dissolved: 2012; 14 years ago
- Type: United States governmental study
- Legal status: Secret program, formally disbanded
- Purpose: Study of unidentified flying objects
- Budget: $22 million over 5 years

The Advanced Aerospace Threat Identification Program (AATIP) was an unclassified but unpublicized investigatory effort funded by the United States Government to study unidentified flying objects (UFOs) or unexplained aerial phenomena (UAP). The program was first made public on December 16, 2017. The program began in 2007, with funding of $22 million over the five years until the available appropriations were ended in 2012. The program began in the U.S. Defense Intelligence Agency.

According to the Department of Defense, the AATIP ended in 2012 after five years, however reporting suggested that U.S. government programs to investigate UFOs continued. This was confirmed in June 2020 with the acknowledgement of a similar military program, the unclassified but previously unreported Unidentified Aerial Phenomenon Task Force.

== History ==
=== Origins ===
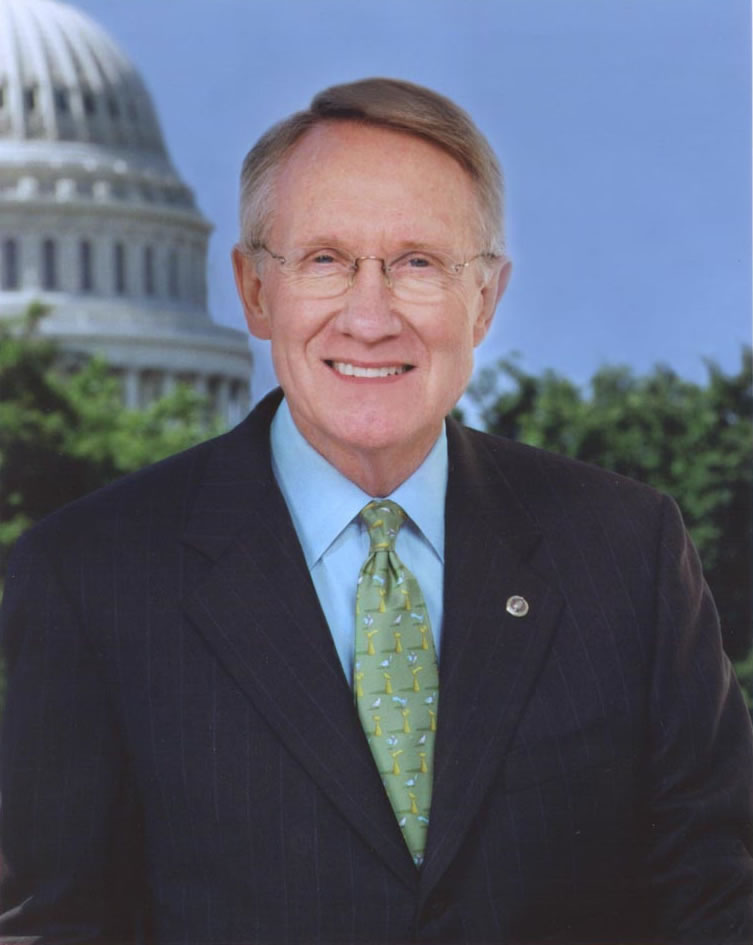
Senator Reid in 2002

Initiated by then Senate Majority Leader Harry Reid (D-Nevada) as the Advanced Aerospace Weapon Systems Applications Program (AAWSAP) to study unexplained aerial phenomena (UAP) at the urging of Reid's friend, Nevada billionaire and governmental contractor Robert Bigelow, and with support from the late senators Ted Stevens (R-Alaska) and Daniel Inouye (D-Hawaii), the program began in the DIA in 2007 and was budgeted $22 million over its five years of operation.

The United States Air Force facility known as “Area 51” is located in Reid's home state of Nevada. In the 1970s, after revived interest in the "1947 Roswell UFO incident", “Area 51” was rumored by ufologists and conspiracy theorists to be the US government's storage location for the crashed alien craft for study.

June 24, 2009 letter from Senate Majority Leader Harry Reid to Deputy Secretary of Defense William Lynn regarding the Advanced Aerospace Threat and Identification Program (AATIP)

When interviewed in the aftermath of publicity surrounding the AATIP, Reid expressed pride in his accomplishment, and was quoted as saying "I think it's one of the good things I did in my congressional service. I've done something that no one has done before." Reid explained the reasoning behind his sponsorship of the program by saying "I’m interested in science, and in helping the American public understand what the hell is going on" and stated that "hundreds and hundreds of papers" have been available since the program was completed and that "Most all of it, 80 percent at least, is public" adding "I wanted it public, it was made public, and you guys have not even looked at it."

A 2009 letter by Reid was published by KLAS-TV investigative journalists George Knapp and Matt Adams, where the Senator states that AATIP has made "much progress" and recommends the creation of a special access program for specific parts of AATIP.

=== Leadership and functions ===
AATIP, through a contract awarded to Bigelow Aerospace Advanced Space Studies (BAASS), has generated a 494-page report that documents alleged worldwide UFO sightings over several decades. This "Ten Month Report" has not been released to the public but focuses on reports, plans and extensive analysis of unexplained aerial phenomena. According to one former BAASS contractor, the BAASS report was only a sample of the materials provided to the Defense Intelligence Agency as "monthly reports were being sent to the Pentagon, in addition to annual program updates, that were all about UAP or anomalous phenomena.” The program also funded and published 38 studies. Those theoretical studies cover a range of advanced, exotic, and theoretical aerospace topics, ranging from "Detection and High Resolution Tracking of Vehicles at Hypersonic Velocities" to "Warp Drive, Dark Energy, and the Manipulation of Extra Dimensions."

Among the information that has been released by the program are "several short videos of military jets encountering something they couldn't identify". The release of those videos were part of a campaign by Luis Elizondo, then working for To The Stars Academy of Arts & Science, who said that he wanted to shed light on the program. The Navy confirmed the authenticity of the videos stating only that they depict what they consider to be "unidentified aerial phenomena". Susan Gough, a Pentagon spokeswoman, confirmed that the three videos were made by naval aviators and that they are "part of a larger issue of an increased number of training range incursions by unidentified aerial phenomena in recent years.”

== Aftermath ==
While the Defense Department stated that AATIP was terminated in 2012, after acknowledgement of the program in 2017 the exact status of AATIP and its alleged termination remained unclear. Elizondo claimed that, while the effort's government funding ended in 2012, the program continued with support from Navy and CIA officials even after his resignation. Reports in 2020 confirmed Elizondo's statement, along with reporting the existence of the U.S. government's successor to AATIP.

On January 16, 2019, the DIA released a list of 38 research titles pursued by the program in response to a Freedom of Information Act (FOIA) request by Steven Aftergood, director of the Federation of American Scientists’ Project on Government Secrecy. One such research topic, “Traversable Wormholes, Stargates, and Negative Energy,” was led by Eric W. Davis of EarthTech International Inc, which was founded by Harold E. Puthoff, who was formerly involved in Project Stargate. Another project called “Invisibility Cloaking” was headed by German scientist Ulf Leonhardt, a professor at the Weizmann Institute of Science in Israel. Yet another title, “Warp Drive, Dark Energy, and the Manipulation of Extra Dimensions,” was attributed to theoretical physicist Richard Obousy, director of the nonprofit Icarus Interstellar. One of those papers was released to the public by Popular Mechanics on February 14, 2020. The paper in question, titled "Clinical Medical Acute & Subacute Field Effects on Human Dermal & Neurological Tissues", was written by Christopher “Kit” Green, formerly a CIA agent, forensic clinician and neuroscientist, who described it as "focused on forensically assessing accounts of injuries that could have resulted from claimed encounters with UAP".

=== Successor program ===
In 2020, the Pentagon acknowledged the existence of a program similar to the AATIP called the Unidentified Aerial Phenomenon Task Force (UAPTF). The unclassified, but previously unacknowledged, program was made public during a June 2020 hearing of the Senate Select Committee on Intelligence. The program has been giving classified briefings to congressional committees and aerospace executives for over a decade. Former Senator Reid stated in reference to the successor program, “It is extremely important that information about the discovery of physical materials or retrieved craft come out.”

=== Reaction and analysis ===
The materials studied by AATIP have been the subject of classified congressional hearings aimed at understanding and identifying the potential threat to the safety and security of aviators. The Navy has confirmed that, in response to inquiries by members of Congress, they have provided a series of briefings by senior naval intelligence officials as well as testimony from "aviators who reported hazards to aviation safety". The contents of those briefings are classified, but Senator Mark Warner, the vice chairman of the Senate Intelligence Committee, who participated in one of those briefings, released a statement requesting further research into "unexplained interference in the air" that could pose safety concerns for naval pilots. According to Popular Mechanics, Senate Intelligence Committee Brigadier General Richard Stapp, Director of the DoD Special Access Program Central Office, testified the mysterious objects being encountered by the military were not related to secret U.S. technology. President Donald Trump has also been briefed on the issue and has stated "I did have one very brief meeting on it. But people are saying they're seeing UFOs. Do I believe it? Not particularly."

Mick West, a science writer and skeptical investigator, suggests the public availability and confirmation of rigorous empirical studies by AATIP could change the entire UFO dynamic: “It would be fantastic if there was some good evidence of something new to science. So far there isn’t”. Several researchers including Benjamin Radford and Robert Sheaffer have pointed out that mundane explanations such as the misidentification of distant jets or ordinary contrails are probably behind the incidents reported. Astrophysicist Leon Golub has stated that those reports have a number of possible explanations such as "bugs in the code for the imaging and display systems, atmospheric effects and reflections, neurological overload from multiple inputs during high-speed flight." In a similar vein, physicist Don Lincoln pointed out that while the pilots of those reports may have thought they saw what they believed to be an "unidentified flying object", since far more plausible explanations exist, he proposed that "what these pilots were seeing is something with a more ordinary explanation, whether it be an instrumental glitch or some other unexplained artifact."

In June 2019, former Senator Reid defended the legacy of the AATIP, saying "When I was contacted by the New York Times, they said they wanted to do a story on UFOs and the money you got, the $22 million. And I said I am happy to do that story, as long as we are not talking about little green men. If you want to talk about science, I'm all in. And that is how I looked at this."

== Media reporting ==
Although the program was not named specifically, Elizondo was quoted in The Huffington Post in late October 2017. Several days earlier, Elizondo announced his involvement in founding an aerospace, science, paranormal and entertainment company called To the Stars Academy for Arts and Science.

AATIP came to a broader public attention on 16 December 2017 – in three news stories – in The Washington Post, Politico and The New York Times:

- The story in the Times included doubts about alien visitation expressed by James Oberg, a space writer and UFO debunker, and Sara Seager, a scientific specialist on the atmospheres of extrasolar planets. Oberg said "There are plenty of prosaic events and human perceptual traits that can account for these stories", although he welcomed further research. It also reported that "Robert Bigelow, a billionaire entrepreneur and longtime friend of Mr. Reid, received most of the money allocated for the Pentagon program."
- The Washington Post story reported that Elizondo was responsible for the public release of footage taken by US fighter jets that appears to show aerial objects maneuvering in inexplicable ways in the USS Princeton aerial object incident. The newspaper also stated that it had conducted several interviews with Elizondo and Christopher Mellon, who is associated with Elizondo in the private venture named "To the Stars Academy for Arts and Sciences".
- In the Politico story Pentagon spokeswoman Dana White claimed that Elizondo had been the director of AATIP. Politico published a statement by an anonymous former congressional staff member that, "After a while[,] the consensus was [that] we really couldn't find anything of substance," ... "They produced reams of paperwork. After all of that there was really nothing there that we could find. It all pretty much dissolved from that reason alone – and the interest level was losing steam. We only did it for a couple of years."

On 22 May 2019, Pentagon spokesman Christopher Sherwood finally confirmed to the New York Post that the program "did pursue research and investigation into unidentified aerial phenomena," dispelling rumors that the program only focused on theoretical physics.

On 26 May 2019, The New York Times reported that US Navy pilots fully briefed AATIP about encounters they had with unexplained objects during the summer of 2014 to March 2015 while flying at high altitudes off the East Coast of the United States. Nonetheless, president Donald Trump, who said he had a short briefing on AATIP, said he is skeptical of Navy sightings of UFOs.

On 1 June 2019, The Intercept published an article with an excerpt from an email obtained via FOIA request. The excerpt called into question Elizondo's position at AATIP. Yes, AATIP existed, and it “did pursue research and investigation into unidentified aerial phenomena,” Pentagon spokesperson Christopher Sherwood confirmed. However, he added: “Elizondo had no responsibilities with regard to the AATIP program while he worked for OUSDI [the Office of Under Secretary of Defense for Intelligence], up until the time he resigned effective 10/4/2017.” To the Stars has attempted to dispute this with an email: “The program was initially run out of the Defense Intelligence Agency but when Lue took it over in 2010 as Director, he ran it out of the Office for the Secretary of Defense (OSD) under the Under Secretary of Defense for Intelligence (USDI).”

A February 2020 Popular Mechanics article by UFO investigative writer and retired police lieutenant Tim McMillan said that Bigelow Aerospace Advanced Space Studies (BAASS) was contracted under the auspices of the AATIP program to study UFO reports and purported paranormal phenomena. According to Steven Aftergood, Director for the Federation of American Scientists Project on Government Secrecy, the AAWSAP contract "sounds like it was a good deal for the contractor. But it would be hard to argue that either the military or the public got their money’s worth."

On July 23, 2020, The New York Times reported that while former Senator Harry Reid "believed that crashes of objects of unknown origin may have occurred and that retrieved materials should be studied; he did not say that crashes had occurred and that retrieved materials had been studied secretly for decades." News reports also repeated a claim made by Eric W. Davis, a former employee of Harold E. Puthoff (co-founder of UFO-promoting company To the Stars) that an "off-world vehicle" might be in the possession of the US government.

== See also ==
- All-domain Anomaly Resolution Office (AARO) – Task force of the US Department of Defense
- Condon Committee – University of Colorado UFO Project
- Identification studies of UFOs
- Immaculate Constellation
- List of UFO sightings
- Pentagon UFO videos – US fighter jet display videos
- Project Blue Book – U.S. Air Force study of UFOs (1952–1969)
- Project Grudge – USAF investigation of UFOs (1949–1951)
- Project Sign – U.S. Air Force study of UFOs (1948)
- Robertson Panel – 1953 scientific committee for UAP reports
- UFO sightings in outer space – UFOs reported by astronauts while in space

Preceded by Project Blue Book	US military projects investigating the UFO phenomenon	Succeeded by All-domain Anomaly Resolution Office
