= Frank L. Burns =

Frank Lee Burns
- Born: November 23, 1939; Colby, Kansas, U.S.
- Died: December 10, 2003 (aged 64) Georgetown, Texas, U.S.
- Allegiance: United States
- Branch: U.S. Army
- Rank: Lieutenant colonel
- Known for: Creator of "Be All That You Can Be" slogan; director of "Task Force Delta"; founder of The Meta Network (TMN)
- Conflicts: Vietnam War (two tours)
- Awards: Silver Star; Bronze Star Medal (with 2 OLCs)
- Education: Central Michigan University; Sam Houston State University
- Spouse: Billye Adams
- Other work: Information specialist President of Metasystems Design Group

Frank Lee Burns (23 November 1939, Colby, Kansas – December 10, 2003, Georgetown, Texas) was a U.S. Army lieutenant colonel who served in Vietnam and, in retirement, became an information specialist.

== Biography ==
Burns earned a B.A. degree from Central Michigan University (where he helped draft the 1962 Port Huron Statement, a political manifesto) and later earned a Master's degree in Criminology from Sam Houston State University.

As an Army officer, Burns served two tours in Vietnam (Silver Star, Bronze Star with 2 OLCs). He created the military recruitment slogan "Be All That You Can Be" in 1980 and was director of "Task Force Delta" (an ad hoc working group of 300 U.S. Army psychic adepts that met quarterly at Fort Leavenworth, Kansas) beginning in 1983. In the same year, Burns created the Meta Network (TMN), one of the first public online communities. TMN was one of the consortium of online communities and networks that banded together to form the Electronic Networking Association in 1985. It describes itself as being "dedicated to learning and creative freedom". Burns ultimately became president of Metasystems Design Group.

Burns was one of the first 100 hang glider pilots in the United States. He flew stunt kites with his wife Billye (née Adams) to the delight of crowds of children at the Washington Monument and elsewhere. They moved to Georgetown, Texas (Billye's home town) in 2002.

Burns died at age 63 in Georgetown. His official military grave marker bears, as an "Emblem of Belief", the Buddhist "Wheel of Righteousness"; a civilian tombstone bears images of hang gliders.

== See also ==
- The Men Who Stare at Goats (2004), book describing some of Burns' activities with fellow officer Jim Channon.
