= The Men Who Stare at Goats (film) =

2009 film by Grant Heslov

- Theatrical release poster
- Directed by: Grant Heslov
- Screenplay by: Peter Straughan
- Based on: The Men Who Stare at Goats by Jon Ronson
- Produced by: Paul Lister; George Clooney; Grant Heslov
- Starring: George Clooney; Jeff Bridges; Ewan McGregor; Kevin Spacey; Goat
- Cinematography: Robert Elswit
- Edited by: Tatiana S. Riegel
- Music by: Rolfe Kent
- Production companies: Winchester Capital Partners; BBC Films; Smokehouse Pictures
- Distributed by: Overture Films (United States); Momentum Pictures (United Kingdom)
- Release dates: September 8, 2009 (Venice); November 6, 2009 (United Kingdom and United States)
- Running time: 94 minutes
- Countries: United States; United Kingdom
- Language: English
- Budget: $24 million
- Box office: $69.1 million

The Men Who Stare at Goats is a 2009 satirical black comedy war film directed by Grant Heslov and written by Peter Straughan. It is loosely based on the 2004 book by Jon Ronson, about an investigation into attempts by the U.S. military to employ psychic powers as a weapon. The film stars George Clooney, Ewan McGregor, Jeff Bridges, and Kevin Spacey.

The Men Who Stare at Goats premiered at the 66th Venice International Film Festival on September 8, 2009, and was released in the United States and the United Kingdom on November 6. The film received mixed reviews from critics.

== Plot ==
In a short prelude, U.S. Army General Dean Hopgood is painfully thwarted in an attempt to pass paranormally through a solid wall by simply running into it.

Ann Arbor Daily Telegram reporter Bob Wilton's wife leaves him for his editor. To prove himself, Bob flies to Kuwait to report on the Iraq War. He stumbles onto the story of a lifetime when he meets retired U.S. Army Special Forces operator Lyn Cassady, who claims he was part of a unit called the "New Earth Army" training "psychic" spies in parapsychological skills including invisibility, remote viewing, and phasing.

Lyn explains the origins of his unit: in 1972, Army officer Bill Django, after falling out of a helicopter in Vietnam, found his newly recruited men unable or unwilling to fire on a Viet Cong soldier before being shot in the chest himself. He experienced a vision of a female Viet Cong soldier who said "their gentleness is their strength," prompting him to go to Northern California to explore how gentleness could make better soldiers. He participated in various activities across California including "naked hot tub encounter sessions" in Santa Rosa, "primal arm wrestling" in Sacramento, and the "beyond jogging movement" in Stockton. Django returned to Fort Bragg in 1980 immersed in the New Age movement, with long braided hair and a tattoo of an All-seeing Eye surmounting a pyramid on his chest. Facilitated by the credulous General Hopgood, Django led the training of a New Earth Army, with Lyn Cassady and Larry Hooper as his top students. The two developed a rivalry over their opposing views on implementing the New Earth Army's philosophy. Lyn wanted to emphasize the teachings' positive side, such as resolving conflict peacefully, whereas Larry was interested in the "dark side" of its military application.

Lyn takes Bob into Iraq. Kidnapped by armed locals, who want to sell them to insurgents, they escape with fellow hostage Mahmud Daash and are rescued by a private security detail led by Todd Nixon. Fleeing when the detail is caught in a friendly fire engagement with another American security detail, Bob and Lyn continue their mission prompted by Lyn's vision of Bill Django.

After their car is disabled by an IED, Bob and Lyn wander in the desert. Lyn reveals he had stopped a goat's heart to test the limit of his mental abilities, and believes this evil deed has cursed him and the New Earth Army. It is also revealed that Hooper conducted an unauthorized LSD experiment in which a soldier killed himself, forcing Django out of the Army.

Bob and Lyn are rescued and taken to a camp run by PSIC, a private research firm engaged in cruel "psychic" and psychological experiments on captured locals and a herd of goats. To Lyn's dismay, Larry runs the firm and employs Django, now a depressed alcoholic. Bob learns the ways of the New Earth Army, and they spike the base's food and water with LSD. Attempting to free themselves of the curse, they free the goats and captured locals. Lyn and Django fly off in a helicopter, disappearing into the sky "like all shamans".

Returning to work as a reporter, Bob writes an article about his experience with Lyn but is frustrated that the only portion to be aired is a segment about the captives being forced to listen to the Barney & Friends theme song for 24 hours, diluting his story to a mere joke. Bob vows to continue trying to get the bigger story out and, following intense concentration, seemingly runs through a solid wall in his office.

== Cast ==
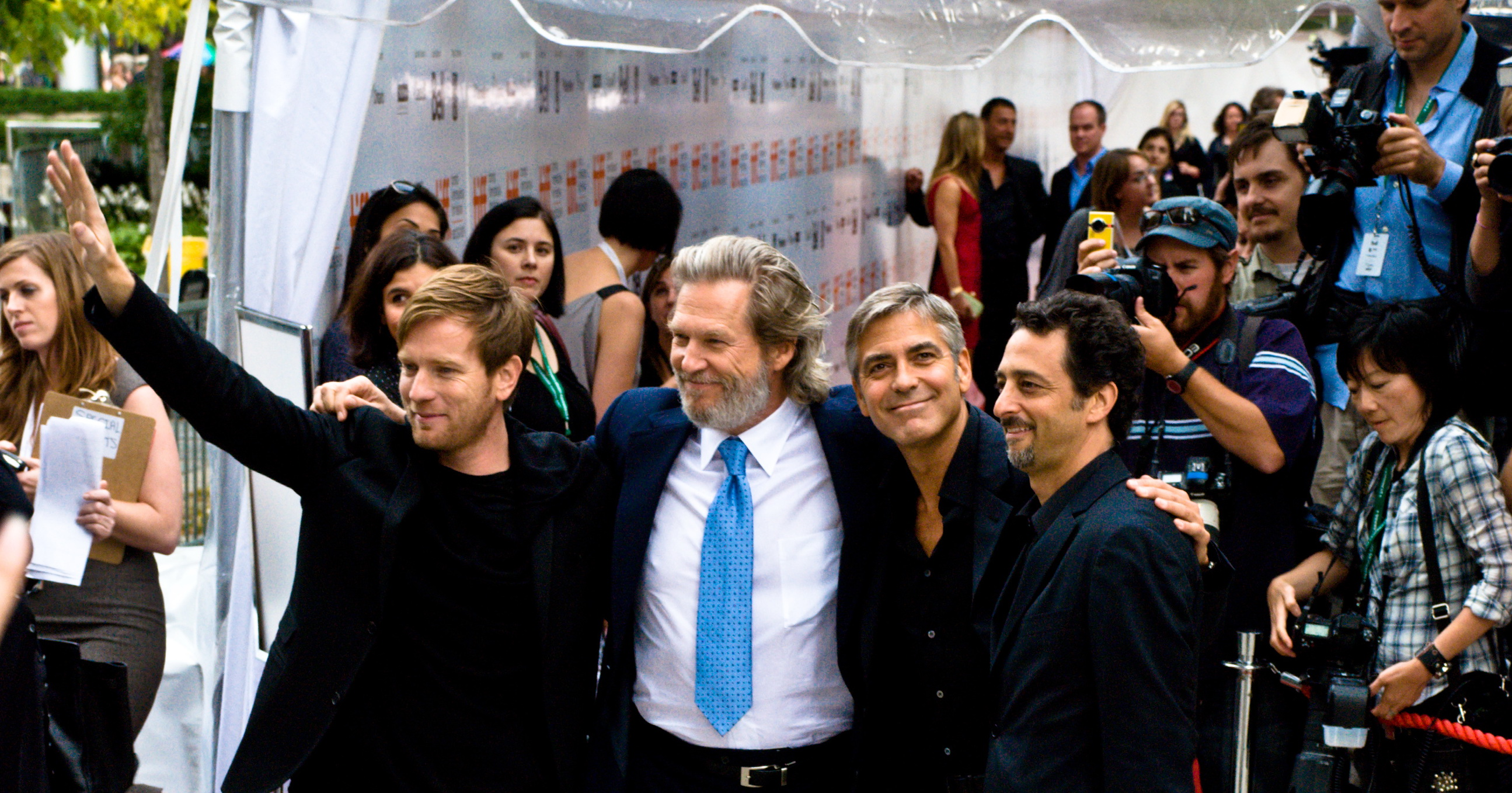
From left to right: cast members Ewan McGregor, Jeff Bridges, George Clooney, and director Grant Heslov attending the film's premiere at the 2009 Toronto International Film Festival

- George Clooney as Lyn Cassady, a combination of several real-life "psychic" spies.
- Jeff Bridges as Bill Django, a character based on Jim Channon, who spent two years in the 1970s investigating new age movements, and subsequently wrote an operations manual for a First Earth Battalion.
- Ewan McGregor as Bob Wilton, apparently inspired by Ronson, a mild-mannered investigative journalist who uncovers the bizarre truth.
- Kevin Spacey as Larry Hooper. Larry represents the New Earth Army's dark side and wishes to use the non-lethal technologies in harmful ways and is the film's main antagonist.
- Robert Patrick as Todd Nixon, heading up a private security firm in post-invasion Iraq.
- Stephen Lang as Major General Dean Hopgood, who firmly believes people can walk through walls.
- Stephen Root as Gus Lacey, who introduces Bob to the New Earth Army's concepts.
- Glenn Morshower as Major Jim Holtz, a more by-the-book soldier.
- Waleed Zuaiter as Mahmud Daash, an Iraqi who gets captured with Cassady and Wilton.
- Nick Offerman as Scotty Mercer
- Rebecca Mader as Debora Wilton

The film's end titles expand on the characters' factual links with this proviso:

Although this film is inspired by John [sic, spelled Jon] Ronson's book The Men Who Stare at Goats, it is fiction, and while the characters Lynn [sic, spelled Lyn] Cassady and Bill Django are based on actual persons, Sergeant Glenn Wheaton and Colonel [sic, a Lt. Col.] Jim Channon, all other characters are invented or are composites, and not portrayals of actual persons. The filmmakers ask that no one attempt walking through walls, cloudbursting while driving, or staring for hours at goats with the intent of harming them...invisibility is fine.

== Reception ==
=== Critical response ===
On review website Rotten Tomatoes, the film holds an approval rating of 51% based on 216 reviews, with an average rating of 5.8/10. The website's critical consensus reads: "Though The Men Who Stare at Goats is a mostly entertaining, farcical glimpse of men at war, some may find its satire and dark humor less than edgy." On Metacritic, the film has a weighted average score of 54 out of 100, based on 33 critics, indicating "mixed or average reviews". Audiences polled by CinemaScore gave the film an average grade of "C+" on an A+ to F scale.

George Clooney's performance was very positively received. Mike Sheridan of entertainment.ie wrote, "Clooney shines in this remarkable story, based on actual events...Clooney is now pretty much the sole bearer of the 'classic movie star' tag, and once again, he injects a performance with a Coen brothers level of quirky. His twitches, his more ponderous moments; you buy this character because it's Clooney, and he's exceptional here."

=== John Sergeant complaint ===
The film is inspired by British journalist Jon Ronson's book, which was accompanied by the 2004 television documentary Crazy Rulers of the World. In turn, Ronson had dedicated his book to producer John Sergeant, who worked intensely through 2003 and 2004 on the documentary. However, Sergeant has complained he has not received any credit for his part in formulating what was the inspiration for the film. Yet, Sergeant's version of events is corroborated by a number of sources: the book The Men Who Stare at Goats itself is dedicated to Sergeant, and the afterword states: "John's research and guidance can be found on every page". Further, Colonel John B. Alexander – one of the story's leaders – has written to Sergeant: "If you want support for your position, tell reporters (or lawyers) to contact me. You were definitely the key person in developing the whole Goats project."

== Home media ==
The Men Who Stare at Goats was released on DVD and Blu-ray Disc in Region 1 on March 23, 2010, and was released in Region 2 on April 19, 2010. The extras include "Goats Declassified: The Real Men of the First Earth Battalion".
