= Channon =

Channon both a given name and a surname. Notable people with the name include:

- Channon Roe (born 1969), American actor
- Henry Channon (1897–1958), politician and diarist (Chips Channon)
- Jim Channon (1939–2017), US army officer
- Mick Channon (born 1948), footballer
- Paul Channon, Baron Kelvedon (1935–2007), politician (son of Henry Chips Channon)

== See also ==
- Murders of Channon Christian and Christopher Newsom
- The Channon, New South Wales
