= Brandon Fugal =

American businessman and entrepreneur (born 1973)

- Born: Brandon Daniel Fugal; April 3, 1973 (age 53); Pleasant Grove, Utah
- Education: Utah Valley University
- Occupations: Businessman, venture capitalist, philanthropist, entrepreneur
- Television: The Secret of Skinwalker Ranch; Beyond Skinwalker Ranch
- Spouse: Kristen McCarty (m. 2021)
- Children: 7

Brandon Daniel Fugal (born April 3, 1973) is an American businessman, real estate developer, venture capitalist, philanthropist, and entrepreneur. He is chairman and co-owner of the Utah office of Colliers International. He owns the 512-acre rural property in Utah known as Skinwalker Ranch and is executive producer and cast member of two History cable and streaming series The Secret of Skinwalker Ranch and Beyond Skinwalker Ranch.

== Early life and education ==
Brandon Fugal was born and raised in Pleasant Grove, Utah. His parents are Jill Boren Fugal and Daniel Boyd Fugal. His father, Daniel Fugal (1948-2021), was an Air Force veteran and local community leader and construction company owner. During his teenage years he worked as a ditch digger on construction crews

Fugal graduated from Pleasant Grove High School in 1991. While in high school he was a self-admitted business geek and had mail-order subscriptions to The Wall Street Journal and BusinessWeek. After high school, from 1992 to 1994, he served on a mission for the Church of Jesus Christ of Latter-day Saints on the Hawaiian island of Oahu. Accompanying him as a fellow missionary was his childhood friend Bryant Arnold, who would later become chief of security at Skinwalker Ranch and cast member, along with Fugal, on the cable and streaming series The Secret of Skinwalker Ranch. While on the mission Fugal in his spare time completed his first real estate transaction.

Fugal attended Utah Valley University in 1994 on a leadership scholarship but subsequently left to continue pursuing his real estate career. Fugal credits his education at the university with giving him the foundation needed to achieve a successful real estate and business career. He donated $5 million for the construction of a major new facility at the university that became "The Brandon D. Fugal Gateway Building," which opened on December 1, 2021. The building houses the university's administrative offices, including the offices of president and vice-presidents, board conference room, classrooms, and student welcome center. Fugal received an honorary doctorate degree in business from the university at its annual commencement ceremony on April 29, 2026.

Like his father, Fugal was an Eagle Scout in the Boy Scouts of America, the highest rank obtainable. Fugal received the Eagle Scout Award in 1987 at age 14. As an adult, he was the recipient of the Outstanding Eagle Scout Award in a ceremony presented by the Utah National Parks Council at Utah Valley University on July 3, 2014.

== Career ==
Fugal began his real estate activities part time while on a religious mission in Hawaii for the Church of Jesus Christ of Latter-Day Saints and continued after returning to Utah. Fugal and his real estate company in the 1990s advised the then young genealogy company Ancestry.com in its search for an expanded operating location and found them their current large headquarters building in Lehi, Utah.

He co-founded Coldwell Banker Commercial Advisors in Utah in 1998 at age 25. It was acquired by Colliers International Group in 2018, and Fugal became chairman of Colliers International Utah, also known as Colliers Intermountain and Colliers Utah.

In 2016, he won the "EY Entrepreneur of the Year Award" for the Utah region in the category of Residential and Commercial Services. He was featured on the July 2016 cover of Utah Business magazine in connection with the honor.

In Hawaii, he is part of Pomaika'i Partners and the effort to create an agricultural and land preservation destination called Laukiha'a Farms Community. He is an investor in the de-extinction and species preservation company Colossal Biosciences.

== Skinwalker Ranch ==
Fugal purchased the 512-acre property known as Skinwalker Ranch in 2016 from Robert Bigelow. Fugal described the acquisition in the following way: "It is the most unusual real estate play that I’ve ever had involvement in and it’s ended up becoming a very intriguing science project as well."

The ranch is the principal shooting location for the hour-long cable and streaming series The Secret of Skinwalker Ranch and a partial location for its sister series Beyond Skinwalker Ranch. The Secret of Skinwalker Ranch is one of History Channel's top-rated series. Fugal is one of the stars of both series and has executive producer credit.

Fugal has said in interviews that months after purchasing the ranch he along with others while on a visit witnessed what he described as a "silver gray disk like object" or "flying saucer" above the mesa on the property.

Fugal travels to the ranch in a 40-minute flight in a black Airbus H130 helicopter that is seen frequently on the show being used in aerial experiments piloted by his brother Cameron Fugal. Brandon Fugal is part owner of the helicopter along with his brothers, who operate an aviation business from a leased private hangar at Provo Airport.

On February 17, 2026, Fugal was honored in person, along with the cast of the series, by the Utah State Legislature for his and the series' contributions to the state.

== Personal life ==
Fugal's first wife was Lacey Anne Fugal, with whom he has four children. He reportedly has seven children today. Years after his first marriage ended in divorce, he married Kristen McCarty in late September 2021. The wedding took place at the Sundance Resort on September 24, 2021, with the rock band Air Supply playing at the reception. Besides her being active in philanthropy and advocacy, Kristen Fugal is the Legal Affairs Director at the Fugal-owned company Adamantium Real Estate. Like her husband, she is an alum of Pleasant Grove High School and Utah Valley University.

Brandon Fugal has three brothers, Cameron, Matthew, and Patrick.

Fugal has a collection of movie memorabilia and rare historical books. Some of the rare books he has acquired are a Book of Hours dated 1470, a 1611 first edition King James Bible, and a 1698 copy of The Celestial Worlds Discover'd.

He also has been recognized as a collector of high-end automobiles, including a Ferrari, Lamborghini, and Porsche.
