= Harold E. Puthoff =

American parapsychologist (born 1936)

Harold Edward Puthoff
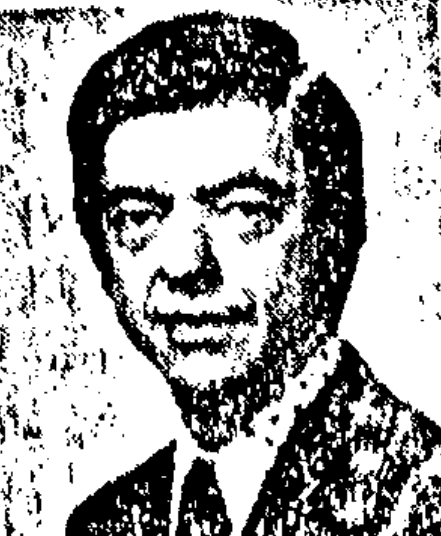
- Born: June 20, 1936 (age 90); Chicago, Illinois, U.S.
- Occupations: Engineer and parapsychologist
- Known for: Paranormal research

Academic background
- Education: University of Florida; Stanford University
- Thesis: The stimulated Raman effect and its application as a tunable laser (1967)
- Doctoral advisor: Richard H. Pantell

Academic work
- Institutions: Stanford Research Institute; Institute for Advanced Studies at Austin

Harold Edward Puthoff (born June 20, 1936), often known as Hal Puthoff, is an American electrical engineer and parapsychologist who started out his career in laser physics. In the 1970s he pivoted to promoting pseudoscientific and occult ideas relating to remote viewing that were widely criticized. In the 1980s and 1990s he published about unconventional theories of gravitation and zero-point energy. Since the 1990s, he has been involved in ufology, specifically finding common cause with those who believe that UFOs are alien spacecraft.

== Early life and career ==
Puthoff was born in Chicago, Illinois. Puthoff is the son of Nathan Mason of Miami and his wife. While a United States Navy Reservist in 1956, Puthoff was potentially exposed to spinal meningitis. He received a BA and an MSc in electrical engineering from University of Florida in 1958. Puthoff was a member of Phi Kappa Tau and Sigma Tau in 1958. Following a planned July 1958 wedding to Janet Boggia, Puthoff was reported by The Miami Herald to be set to begin active duty service in the United States Navy.

In 1967, Puthoff earned a Ph.D. in electrical engineering from Stanford University with a thesis, "The stimulated Raman effect and its application as a tunable laser". Puthoff then worked on tunable lasers and electron beam devices and co-authored (with R. Pantell) Fundamentals of Quantum Electronics (Wiley, 1969).

== Parapsychology and pseudoscience ==
Puthoff took an interest in the Church of Scientology in the late 1960s and reached what was then the top OT VII level by 1971. Puthoff wrote up his "wins" for a Scientology publication, claiming to have achieved "remote viewing" abilities (called exteriorization in Scientology). In 1974, Puthoff also wrote a piece for Scientology's Celebrity magazine, stating that Scientology had given him "a feeling of absolute fearlessness". Puthoff severed all connection with Scientology in the late 1970s.

In the 1970s and 1980s, Puthoff directed a program at the Stanford Research Institute (SRI) to investigate paranormal abilities, collaborating with Russell Targ in a study of the purported psychic abilities of Uri Geller, Ingo Swann, Pat Price, Joseph McMoneagle and others, as part of what they called the Stargate Project. The group's claims were popularized in a 1973 wire service story. In 1977, papers nationwide reported that the SRI studies were linked to the CIA, which allegedly sought to use ESP for espionage or as a method to deceive their Soviet counterparts. It was further reports that SRI had extensive links to Scientology: Puthoff, Swann, and Pat Price were all high-ranking Scientologists, multiple SRI staff had ties to Scientology, and the group's initial funding came from a Scientologist. Also in 1977, Targ and Puthoff published a book titled "Mind-Reach" on their claims. Both Geller and Swann convinced Puthoff and Targ that they possessed psychic powers, though Geller employed sleight of hand tricks.

Puthoff and Targ studied Uri Geller at SRI, declaring that Geller had psychic powers, though there were flaws with the controls in the experiments, and Geller used sleight of hand on many other occasions. According to Terence Hines:

Geller turned out to be nothing more than a magician using sleight of hand and considerable personal charm to fool his admirers. The tests at SRI turned out to have been run under conditions that can best be described as chaotic. Few limits were placed on Geller's behavior, and he was more or less in control of the procedures used to test him. Further, the results of the tests were incorrectly reported in Targ and Puthoff's Nature paper.

Psychologists David Marks and Richard Kammann attempted to replicate Puthoff and Targ's remote viewing experiments. In a series of thirty-five studies, they could not replicate the results. While investigating the procedure of the original experiments, Marks and Kammann discovered that the notes given to the judges in Puthoff and Targ's experiments contained clues as to which order they were carried out. Examples included referring to yesterday's two targets or the inclusion of the date of the session written at the top of the page. They concluded that these clues were the reason for the experiment's high hit rates. Terence Hines has written:

Examination of the few actual transcripts published by Targ and Puthoff show that just such clues were present. To find out if the unpublished transcripts contained cues, Marks and Kammann wrote to Targ and Puthoff requesting copies. It is almost unheard of for a scientist to refuse to provide his data for independent examination when asked, but Targ and Puthoff consistently refused to allow Marks and Kammann to see copies of the transcripts. Marks and Kammann were, however, able to obtain copies of the transcripts from the judge who used them. The transcripts were found to contain a wealth of cues.

Marks noted that when the cues were eliminated the results fell to a chance level. James Randi noted that controlled tests by several other researchers, eliminating several sources of cueing and extraneous evidence present in the original tests, produced negative results. Students also solved Puthoff and Targ's locations from the clues that had inadvertently been included in the transcripts. Marks and Kamman concluded: "Until remote viewing can be confirmed in conditions which prevent sensory cueing the conclusions of Targ and Puthoff remain an unsubstantiated hypothesis." According to Martin Gardner, Puthoff (and Targ) "imagined they could do research in parapsychology but instead dealt with 'psychics' who were cleverer than they were".

== Business ventures ==
In 1985, Puthoff founded The Institute for Advanced Studies at Austin (IASA), later incorporated under EarthTech International, Inc., in 1991, which pursues energy generation and propulsion research.

Puthoff and EarthTech were granted a US Patent in 1998, with claims that information could be transmitted through a distance using a modulated potential with no electric or magnetic field components. While "the invention does appear to rest on solid, albeit somewhat obscure, physics principles", the case is used for educational purposes in patent law where "the examiner failed to make a prima facie case for inoperability or lack of enablement". According to the Wisconsin Law School case study, "The lesson of the Puthoff patent is that in a world where both types of patents are more and more common, even a competent examiner may fail to distinguish innovation from pseudoscience."

== Zero-point energy ==
In the late 1980s and 1990s, Puthoff co-authored papers using the model of stochastic electrodynamics that leads to a model of inertia as an electromagnetic drag force on accelerating particles produced by interaction with the zero-point field. This concept built on Andrei Sakharov's proposal in 1968 that the gravitational constant was a consequence of zero-point fluctuations in the vacuum. Steve Carlip disputed one of Puthoff's 1989 papers for containing a serious computational error which makes the effect negligible; Puthoff responded that a different parameter value in the model would restore its usefulness. The 1994 paper was the subject of a news article in Science. Subsequent analysis by Yefim S. Levin raising numerous questions concerning the mathematical correctness of the formula and the use of non-relativistic treatments of magnetic effects, concluding that model does not show inertia as a result of zero-point-field effects.

In 1989 Puthoff's paper suggesting an Oblers'-like summation of electrons across the universe as the origin of electromagnetic zero-point field suggested by previous workers. The cosmological implications of these ideas were examined by Paul S. Wesson. He concluded that such energy is both required by quantum field theory and inconsistent with cosmology.

=== Energy extraction ===
Building on earlier theoretical work by Robert L. Forward leveraging the Casimir force to extract electrical energy, Daniel Cole and Puthoff analyzed the thermodynamics of a simple hypothetical Casimir force device. The hypothetical devices discussed in these articles are capacitors, multiple layers of charged conductors sufficiently close for the short-range Casimir force to compress the structure. This works against the mutual repulsion of the conductor's electrical energy stores; external electricity would be needed to recharge the device. Other authors have studied mechanical and thermal devices based on Casimir forces.

In 1997, Scientific American wrote an article featuring Puthoff and his Institute for Advanced Studies. The article noted Puthoff's strong belief in the potential for exploiting zero point energy along with the numerous failed attempts to demonstrate such potential.

In his popular science book, Massimo Pigliucci called Puthoff's hopes to extract energy from empty space as running contrary to the laws of physics: "a proposition... that violates basic principles of thermodynamics and that is considered pseudoscience by credentialed physicists."

== UFOs ==
In 1995, Puthoff joined the National Institute for Discovery Science, a paranormal and UFO research group funded by aerospace entrepreneur Robert Bigelow.

In 2008, Puthoff joined the Bigelow Aerospace Advanced Space Studies, a Nevada aerospace corporation with contracts under the US government UFO program Advanced Aerospace Threat Identification Program.

In 2017, he co-founded the UFO-dedicated company To the Stars with Tom DeLonge. There, he was tasked with analyzing pieces of metal alleged to be from UFOs.

In 2018, Puthoff was awarded the "Tim Dinsdale Memorial Award recognizing significant contributions to the expansion of human understanding through the study of unexplained phenomena" and he addressed a joint meeting of Society for Scientific Exploration (SSE) and the International Remote Viewing Association on that occasion. His address mainly discussed recent disclosures about US government studies of UFOs.

Puthoff is a participant in The Age of Disclosure, a 2025 documentary film about UFOs and claimed government programs involving recovery of alien technology crashed on Earth. That year, he promoted his views on The Joe Rogan Experience podcast. In May 2026, Puthoff appeared on The Diary of a CEO podcast where he repeated second-hand claims that federal officials had recovered "four separate types of life" from UFOs. Puthoff added "I have not had direct access to that but I believe the people who I talked to."
