= Guy Savelli =

American martial artist

- Born: United States
- Died: December 1, 2020
- Style: Shotokan; Tai chi Kun Tao; Goshin Jitsu Kyo Jujo

Guy Savelli was a martial artist, teacher, and spiritual healer. He taught the spiritual and mental aspects of martial arts, especially Kuntao.

In 1983, Savelli was recruited by Col. Nick Rowe to train U.S. Army Special Forces soldiers in his techniques at Fort Bragg. Among Savelli's students were hand-to-hand combat instructors for the U.S. Army Survival, Evasion, Resistance, and Escape (SERE) program. Savelli was further engaged as a hand-to-hand combat instructor for Special Operations units in the early 2000s. His experiences are detailed in Ronson's 2004 book The Men Who Stare at Goats.

Savelli was a research subject at Duke University, the Psychical Research Institute, and the Mind Science Foundation in San Antonio, Texas. Positive results of his work have been published in Research in Parapsychology, the Journal of Parapsychology, as well as by the Parapsychology Department of JFK University. Savelli has also authored an introductory text on the Spiritual, Mental, and Physical Teachings of Chinese Kung-Fu. Savelli died of Covid-19 on December 1, 2020.
