= Skinwalker Ranch =

Reputed paranormal area in Utah, United States

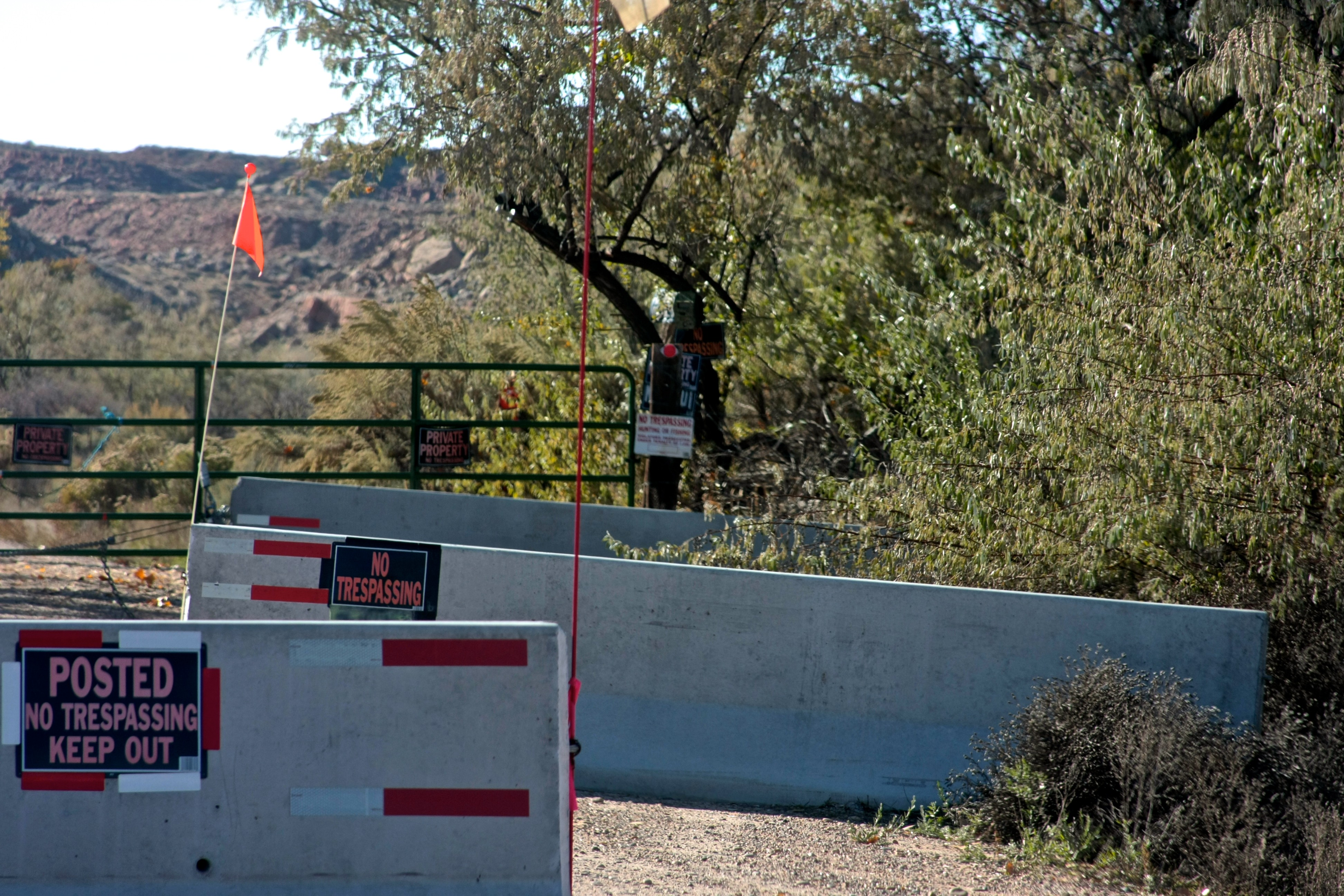
- One entrance to the ranch
- Interactive map of Skinwalker Ranch
- Town/City: Uintah County, Utah, U.S.
- Coordinates: 40°15′29″N 109°53′18″W
- Owner: pre 1934 – Benton McMillan Locke And Ona Ora Bryant; 1934–1994 – Kenneth and Edith Myers; 1994–1996 – Terry and Gwen Sherman; 1996–2016 – Robert Bigelow; 2016–Present – Brandon Fugal, via Adamantium Real Estate LLC
- Area: c. 512 acres (c. 207 ha)
- Website: https://skinwalker-ranch.com/

Skinwalker Ranch, previously known as Sherman Ranch, is a property of approximately 512 acres (207 ha), (Note: Actual acreage is uncertain due to possible later inclusion of the approach road(s)) located southeast of Ballard, Utah, that is reputed to be the site of paranormal and UFO-related activities. Its name is taken from the skin-walker, known and originated from Navajo legend.

== Background ==
UFO reports in the Uintah Basin were publicized in the 1970s. Claims about the ranch first appeared in 1996 in the Salt Lake City, Utah, Deseret News, and later in the alternative weekly Las Vegas Mercury as a series of articles by investigative journalist George Knapp. These early stories detailed the claims of a family that allegedly experienced inexplicable and frightening events after they purchased and occupied the property.

The ranch, located in west Uintah County, Utah, bordering the Uintah and Ouray Indian Reservation, was popularly dubbed the UFO ranch due to its ostensible 50-year history of odd events said to have taken place there. According to Kelleher and Knapp, they saw or investigated evidence of close to 100 incidents that include vanishing and mutilated cattle, sightings of unidentified flying objects or orbs, large animals with piercing red eyes that they say were unscathed when struck by bullets, and invisible objects emitting destructive magnetic fields. Among those involved were retired US Army Colonel John B. Alexander, who characterized the National Institute for Discovery Science (NIDSci) effort as an attempt to get hard data using a "standard scientific approach". However, the investigators admitted to "difficulty obtaining evidence consistent with scientific publication".

Cattle mutilations have been part of the folklore of the surrounding area for decades. When Robert Bigelow, founder of the NIDSci, purchased the ranch for $200,000 in 1996, this was reportedly the result of his having been convinced by the stories of mutilations, that included tales of strange lights and unusual impressions made in grass and soil told by the family of former ranch owner Terry Sherman.

== Book and funding ==
In 2005, Colm Kelleher and co-author George Knapp published a book, Hunt for the Skinwalker, in which they describe the ranch being acquired by Bigelow to study anecdotal sightings of UFOs, Bigfoot-like creatures, crop circles, glowing orbs and poltergeist activity reported by its former owners.

Kelleher and Knapp's book was read by Defense Intelligence Agency official James Lacatski, who contacted Bigelow and obtained permission to visit the ranch. Lacatski had a supernatural experience there, which Bigelow relayed to his friend Harry Reid. Reid and Ted Stevens, a UFO experiencer, quickly agreed that the ranch deserved attention and inserted a line into the Department of Defense budget appropriating $22 million to study unidentified aerial phenomena.

== Criticism ==
In 2020, skeptical author Robert Sheaffer found the phenomena at Skinwalker to be "almost certainly illusory", given that NIDSci found no proof after several years of monitoring, and that the previous owners of the property, who had lived there for 60 years, say that no supernatural events of any kind had happened there. Sheaffer considers the explanation reliant upon the fewest assumptions to be that the Sherman family invented the story "prior to selling it to the gullible Bigelow", with many of the more extraordinary claims originating solely from Terry Sherman, who worked as a caretaker after the ranch was sold to Bigelow.

In 1996, skeptic James Randi awarded Bigelow a tongue-in-cheek Pigasus Award for funding the purchase of the ranch and for supporting John E. Mack's and Budd Hopkins' investigations. The award category designated Bigelow as "the funding organization that supported the most useless study of a supernatural, paranormal or occult [claim]".

In 2023, ufologist Barry Greenwood, writing in the Journal of Scientific Exploration, criticized the $22 million research program led by James Lacatski. He emphasized the lack of any documentary evidence from the ranch after many decades of exploration and characterized Skinwalker as "always in the business of selling belief and hope".

== Ownership ==
- pre 1934 — Benton M Locke and Ona Ora Bryant
- 1934–1994 — Kenneth and Edith Myers
- 1994–1996 — Terry and Gwen Sherman
- 1996–2016 — Robert Bigelow
- 2016–present — Brandon Fugal, via Adamantium Real Estate LLC

In 2016, Bigelow sold Skinwalker Ranch to Adamantium Real Estate LLC for around $500,000. After this purchase, roads leading to the ranch were blocked, the perimeter was guarded by cameras and barbed wire, and signs were posted that aimed to prevent people from approaching the ranch.

Adamantium Real Estate, LLC, a Delaware limited liability company based in Salt Lake City, Utah, filed a U.S. Trademark application for the service mark "Skinwalker Ranch" on February 15, 2017, and it was approved and registered on April 14, 2020, with the mark applicable to "providing recreation facilities; entertainment services, namely, creation, development, production, and distribution of multimedia content, internet content, motion pictures, and television shows." An additional trademark filing to expand use on "cups and mugs, shirts and short-sleeved shirts, sports caps and hats" was filed by Adamantium Real Estate, LLC on June 21, 2021, and was approved and registered on July 12, 2022.

In March 2020, Brandon Fugal, a real estate developer and tech investor, announced ownership of the ranch. In 2022, Fugal announced a partnership with the Hutchings Museum Institute in Lehi, Utah, designed to "better understand the environment and historical significance" of the ranch.

== In popular culture ==
Title	Year	Type	Description
Lost Tapes	2009	TV	A fictional portrayal of the ranch is featured in an encounter with a skin-walker and the protagonists.
Joe Rogan Questions Everything	2013	TV	Skinwalker Ranch is shown in Episode 5.
Skinwalker Ranch	2013	Film	Loosely based upon the folklore surrounding the ranch.
Portals to Hell	2019	TV	The Strawberry River Inn featured in the episode is situated a stone's throw from the ranch, and it is claimed to experience the same paranormal phenomena as Skinwalker Ranch.
This Paranormal Life	2019	Podcast	Featured in episode 42.
Last Podcast on the Left	2019	Podcast	Episodes 352, 353 & 354 are a three part series on Skinwalker Ranch.
Project Blue Book	2020	TV	Features Skinwalker Ranch in Season 2 Episode 7 including elements of various claims, such as a mysterious wolf and moving objects.
Ancient Aliens	2020	TV	Mentions Skinwalker Ranch in connection with claimed shapeshifting beings and ancient astronaut theories. (episode: The Mystery Of Skinwalker Ranch)
The Secret of Skinwalker Ranch ("Curse of Skinwalker Ranch" in the UK)	2020-present	TV	A television series on History channel, featuring "a team of scientists and experts" that uses science and technology such as lasers, ground-penetrating radar, and drone thermography as they search the property, attempting to explain claims of UFO sightings, cattle mutilations, and paranormal events. Is a multi-season reality series coming from the producers of The Curse of Oak Island.
UFO (American TV series)	2021	TV	Episode 102 features a description of Robert Bigelow's purchase and NIDSci's scientific study of the Skinwalker Ranch.
Herd Culling	2022	Music	The lyrics for the song "Herd Culling" from the Porcupine Tree album Closure/Continuation was inspired by Skinwalker Ranch.

== See also ==
- List of topics characterized as pseudoscience
