= National Institute for Discovery Science =

Independent anomaly research organization

National Institute for Discovery Science (NIDSci)
- Founded: 1995
- Defunct: 2004
- Headquarters: Las Vegas, Nevada, U.S.
- Key people: Robert Bigelow, John B. Alexander, Eric W. Davis, Colm Kelleher, Christopher "Kit" Green, Edgar Mitchell, Melvin L. Morse, Hal Puthoff, Harrison Schmitt, Jessica Utts, Jacques Vallée

The National Institute for Discovery Science (NIDSci) was a privately financed research organization based in Las Vegas, Nevada, U.S., and operated from 1995 to 2004. It was founded in 1995 by real-estate developer Robert Bigelow, who set it up to research and advance serious study of various fringe science and paranormal topics, most notably ufology. Deputy Administrator Colm Kelleher was quoted as saying the organization was not designed to study UFOs only. "We don't study aliens, we study anomalies. They're the same thing in a lot of people's minds, but not in our minds." NIDSci was disbanded in October 2004.

== History ==
The National Institute for Discovery Science, known also as NIDS, was founded by Robert Bigelow to support the scientific study of paranormal phenomena and performed research in the areas of cattle mutilation and black triangle reports.

The organization bought Skinwalker Ranch after journalist George Knapp first wrote about the property in 1996, and Deputy Administrator Colm Kelleher led the investigation for a number of years.

A hotline was established in 1999 to receive reports of odd occurrences. Over 5,000 reports were submitted via phone and email to the organization. Officials say many were explained as missile test launches and meteors.

== See also ==
- Bigelow Aerospace
- Advanced Aerospace Threat Identification Program
- Unidentified Aerial Phenomena Task Force
