= The Men Who Stare at Goats =

2004 nonfiction book by Jon Ronson

- First edition
- Author: Jon Ronson
- Language: English
- Genre: Non-fiction, Investigative Journalism
- Publisher: Picador (UK); Simon & Schuster (US)
- Publication date: 2004
- Publication place: United Kingdom; United States
- Media type: Print (Hardcover and Paperback); Audiobook
- Pages: 277 (first edition, hardback)
- ISBN: 978-0-330-37547-4
- OCLC: 56653467

The Men Who Stare at Goats is a 2004 non-fiction book by Jon Ronson concerning the U.S. Army's exploration of New Age concepts and the potential military applications of the paranormal. The title refers to attempts to kill goats by staring at them and stopping their hearts. The book is a companion to a three-part TV series broadcast in Britain on Channel 4—Crazy Rulers of the World (2004)—the first episode of which is also entitled "The Men Who Stare at Goats". The book received a loose feature film adaptation released in 2009.

== Content ==
=== Book synopsis ===
The book's first five chapters examine the efforts of a handful of U.S. Army officers in the late 1970s and early 1980s to exploit paranormal phenomena, New Age philosophy, and elements of the human potential movement to enhance U.S. military intelligence-gathering capabilities as well as overall operational effectiveness. These include the First Earth Battalion Operations Manual (1979) and a "psychic spy unit" established by Army Intelligence at Fort Meade, Maryland, in the late 1970s. (This was the Stargate Project, which the book never mentions by name.) Ronson is put on the historical trail of the "men who stare at goats"—Special Forces soldiers who supposedly experimented with psychic powers against de-bleated goats at Fort Bragg, North Carolina, at the now-decommissioned "Goat Lab" medical training facility. He examines, and dispenses with, several candidates for the legendary "master sergeant" (Chapter 2) who was reported to have killed a goat simply by staring at it, in the earliest days of the program. A martial arts instructor named Guy Savelli claims to be the master sergeant in question.

In the middle third of the book (Chapters 6–11), the author leaps to the present day—i.e., 2004, just after the Abu Ghraib abuse revelations—and attempts to make connections between the earlier (now terminated, and mostly discredited) military programs and the abuses resulting from the post–9/11 war on terror (Abu Ghraib, Guantanamo Bay, psyops in Iraq, etc.). This includes the use of the children's song "I Love You" from Barney & Friends on Iraqi prisoners of war. A purported linking element is the alleged use of music and subliminal messaging at the 1993 Waco siege and other FBI operations. Another is the private business "franchises" and consultancies that retired members of the "psychic unit" later pursued as civilians. A connection is also proposed between these "privatized" psychics and the mass suicide of members of the Heaven's Gate cult in 1997.

The final section of the book (Chapters 13–16) leaps backward to the 1950s and attempts to connect the Army psychic program, and later interrogation techniques, with the CIA's MKUltra "mind control" research program and the notorious death of Army researcher Frank Olson in 1953. Ronson spends time with Olson's son Eric as he attempts to uncover the mystery of his father's death. Eric suggests that Frank Olson was murdered, not simply because he knew too much but, rather, that he was having a crisis of conscience and seriously entertaining the notion of going public with all that he knew. The narrative ends with the suggestion that the "psychic warriors" are now back in business working for the U.S. military again, possibly in support of assassinations.

=== Featured individuals ===
==== Interviewed by Ronson ====
- Glenn B. Wheaton, retired U.S. Army Special Forces sergeant with 5th SFG; psychic and remote viewer; set Ronson on the trail of the "men who stare at goats"
- Albert Stubblebine, retired Army major general; career military intelligence officer; proponent of psychic warfare, levitation, spoon bending and walking through walls
- Jim Channon, retired Army lieutenant colonel; author of the First Earth Battalion Operations Manual; New Age guru and consultant
- John B. Alexander, retired Army colonel; proponent of non-lethal weapons and of military applications of the paranormal; introduced Channon's book to Stubblebine
- Frederick Holmes "Skip" Atwater, retired Army lieutenant; Gen. Stubblebine's "psychic headhunter"; later president of the Monroe Institute
- James V. Hardt, research psychologist and expert on the electrophysiological basis of spiritual states; assisted the "men who stare at goats"
- Steven Halpern, new-age musician consulted by the Army on how to deploy music as a weapon or for mind control via subliminal messages
- Guy Savelli, martial artist and psychic; recruited to work with U.S. Special Forces by Col. Alexander; purportedly "downed" a goat and killed a hamster using only his mind
- Pete Brusso, martial artist and psychic; inventor/marketer of a personal self-defense weapon ("the Predator"); Savelli's rival for U.S. military contract work
- Uri Geller, spoon-bending Israeli celebrity psychic entertainer; self-described consultant to the U.S. military
- Prof. Courtney Brown, Emory University political scientist and paranormal proponent; allegedly barred from the Art Bell radio show after inspiring the Heaven's Gate mass suicide
- Prudence Calabrese, psychic who worked with Courtney Brown; also banned from the Art Bell radio show
- Christopher Cerf, Sesame Street songwriter; song appropriated by U.S. Army PSYOPs soldiers in Iraq
- Jamal al-Harith, Jamaican-British convert to Islam; subjected to musical weirdness as GTMO prisoner
- Edward ("Ed") A. Dames, retired Army major, intelligence officer and psychic; frequent guest on the Art Bell radio show; known as "Dr Doom"
- Joseph McMoneagle, retired Army NCO and chief warrant officer; intelligence officer and psychic; now runs a remote viewing business
- Lyn Buchanan, retired Army intelligence NCO and psychic.
- Eric Olson, son of Frank Olson; lifelong activist to uncover cause of his father's mysterious death
- Bob Ricks, American law enforcement official; incident commander at 1993 Waco siege
- Norman Cournoyer, Ft. Detrick colleague of Frank Olson; confirmed to Frank's son Eric that, in his view, his father's death was a CIA murder

==== Discussed in depth ====
- Michael Echanis, self-styled "soldier of fortune" and psychic martial artist; "pin-up" icon for Special Forces groupies; died in a 1978 accident in Nicaragua
- Gen. Manuel Noriega, superstitious dictator of Panama; exploited sorcery and witchcraft to wield power; nemesis of Gen. Stubblebine
- Art Bell, late-night radio host and proponent of all manner of paranormality and conspiracies; mentor to Ed Dames
- Tony Robbins, self-help guru and firewalker; mentor to Gen. Stubblebine
- Frank Burns, retired Army colonel and Internet pioneer; purportedly coined (with Channon) the Army's '80s recruiting slogan "Be All That You Can Be"
- Igor Smirnov, Russian psychiatrist; mind control and thought projection expert; consulted by FBI during the 1993 Waco siege
- Frank Olson, American bacteriologist and Army bio-weaponeer; died in 1953 in tragic CIA misadventure
- Sidney Gottlieb, American chemist and CIA spymaster; dosed Frank Olson with LSD days before his death
- "Dr. Bucha", U.S. Army scientist who, in the 1950s, investigated tactical uses of helicopter flicker vertigo; may be an urban legend as no one knows his first name
- David Koresh, American leader of the Branch Davidians religious sect; subjected to musical weirdness and finally killed during 1993 Waco siege

== Reception ==
Ronson's book was met with mostly positive, often glowing, reviews: the Boston Globe opined that it is "a hilarious and unsettling book.... Ronson comes off as an unusual cross between Comedy Central's Jon Stewart and The New Yorker's Seymour Hersh." The New York Times' Janet Maslin stated that "Ronson sets up his book perfectly. It moves with wry, precise agility from crackpot to crackpot in its search for the essence of this early New Age creativity....".

Some critics, however, were skeptical of what they considered Ronson's shaky logic and some of his bolder assertions. Alex Heard's review in U-T San Diego was subtitled "Goats tries hard to link psychic-spy projects from the past to today's events, and mostly fails". In many instances, he wrote, "...there isn't a link. Instead there's a progression of occurrences that don't connect in a meaningful way. The result is a strange new blend: Conspiracy theory meets Six Degrees of Kevin Bacon.... You're left feeling like you've been told a shaggy-goat story."

== Television series ==
The 2004 series Crazy Rulers of the World was aired in three parts:

- Part 1: "The Men Who Stare at Goats"
- Part 2: "Funny Torture"
- Part 3: "The Psychic Footsoldiers"

It was broadcast in Britain on Channel 4.

== Feature film adaptation ==
A fictionalized feature film version of the book was released in 2009 under the same name. Grant Heslov directed from a script by Peter Straughan. It is set in Iraq, but was filmed in Comerío Street, Bayamón, Puerto Rico, and at the New Mexico Military Institute. The story centers on "Bob Wilton" (Ewan McGregor) a desperate reporter who stumbles upon the story of a lifetime. He meets "Lyn Cassady" (George Clooney) who claims to be a former secret U.S. military psychic soldier reactivated post-9/11. Jeff Bridges plays "Bill Django", the founder of the psychic soldier program and Lyn's mentor. Kevin Spacey plays "Larry Hooper" who is a former psychic soldier now running a rogue PSYOPs unit in Iraq. The film is prefaced with a title card stating "More of this is true than you would believe". The DVD release of The Men Who Stare at Goats includes a bonus documentary featuring Ronson and many of the people who feature prominently in his book.

Coinciding with the release of the feature film in 2009, John Sergeant, the producer of the TV series Crazy Rulers of the World, accused Ronson of "airbrushing him out of the story". While Ronson dedicated his book to Sergeant and included an afterword commending his research and guidance, the feature film did not mention his contributions.
