= Bundeswehr Office for Defence Planning =

Planning office of the German Armed Forces

- Planungsamt der Bundeswehr (PlgABw)
- Insignia
- Active: 24 October 2012 – present
- Country: Federal Republic of Germany
- Garrison/HQ: Berlin
- Website: Official website

Commanders
- Director: Major General Stefan Lüth

The Bundeswehr Office for Defence Planning (German: Planungsamt der Bundeswehr; PlgABw) is a branch of the Bundeswehr subordinate to the Federal Ministry of Defence. The office is a think tank which decides the future direction of the Bundeswehr and how it can achieve those goals. It is headquartered in Berlin and has four directorates:

- Objectives and Innovation
- Capability Management
- Resources and Implementation
- Scientific Support and Interoperability

The office was established in 2012 under the leadership of Frank Leidenberger. Leidenberger was succeeded by Thomas Jugel, then Wolfgang Gäbelein. On March 20, 2025, Gäbelein handed over leadership to the current director, Stefan Lüth.
