= George Knapp (television journalist) =

American journalist

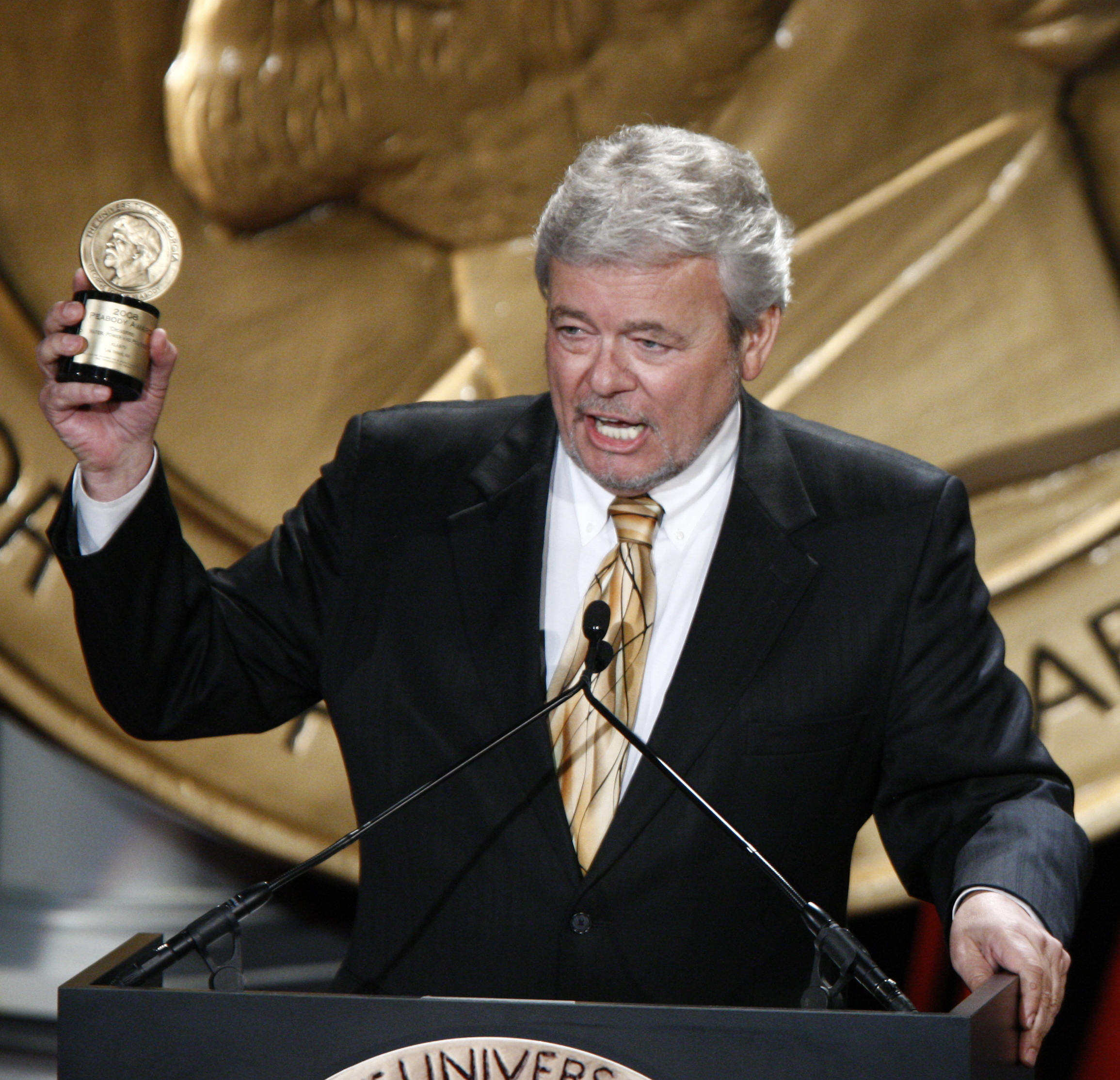
- Knapp in 2009 at the 68th Annual Peabody Awards
- Born: Woodbury, New Jersey, U.S.
- Education: University of the Pacific (M.A.); University of West Georgia (B.A.)
- Occupations: Journalist and talk radio host
- Known for: UFO journalism (including Bob Lazar); Coast to Coast AM
- Television: KLAS-TV

George T. Knapp is an American journalist, news anchor and talk radio host. Much of his work has focused on the paranormal, particularly UFOs. Knapp is noted for bringing to prominence UFO conspiracy theorists John Lear in 1987 and Bob Lazar in 1989. He is also known for his work as a television presenter and investigative journalist on non-paranormal subjects, for which he has been recognized with Edward R. Murrow Awards, Peabody Awards, and Pacific Southwest Regional Emmy Awards.

A longtime fixture in Las Vegas media, he works at KLAS-TV (Channel 8) and is also a frequent host of Coast to Coast AM, a syndicated paranormal radio show on which UFOs are a frequent topic.

== Early life ==
Born in Woodbury, New Jersey, Knapp grew up in northern California and graduated from Franklin High School in Stockton, where he was the senior class president. He earned a bachelor's degree in communication from the University of West Georgia and a master's degree in the same field from the University of the Pacific. He taught debate and forensics at both the University of the Pacific and University of California, Berkeley.

He moved to Las Vegas in 1979, working first as a cab driver before being hired as an intern at KLVX-TV Channel 10. From there, Knapp was hired as a reporter and news anchor for KLAS in 1981.

== Career ==
At KLAS-TV, Knapp has served a number of roles, including as a news anchor, a member of the I-Team investigative unit, as well as the host of "Street Talk". For his work on "Street Talk" he won an Emmy for commentary. Knapp was mentored in journalism by Ned Day, who Knapp created a series about following his death. Knapp's regular reporting has included topics like organized crime and government corruption.

In programmes aired in January 1987 and January 1988, Knapp interviewed aviator and UFO claimant John Lear, who claimed that the United States government had alien spacecraft and bodies. Lear introduced Knapp to another UFO claimant, originally anonymously known as "Dennis", which KLAS-TV interviewed in a program aired in May 1989, and who was later interviewed in a program which aired in November 1989 which revealed his real name to be Bob Lazar. Lazar claimed to have worked on UFOs at the secretive Area 51. Knapp's interviews of Lazar attracted international attention, and catapulted Area 51 into the public consciousness. In 1990, Knapp's stories on UFOs earned him an "Individual Achievement by a Journalist" award from the United Press International. Knapp interviewed UFO claimant Bill Cooper alongside Lear in 1989. Knapp hosted a programme on KLAS-TV in 1990 which was critical of Cooper's claims. Knapp's willingness to listen to the testimony of UFO claimants caused him to be mocked by some of his fellow Las Vegas journalists.

In 1991, Knapp left KLAS to work for Altamira Communications, a public relations firm whose clients included advocates of the Yucca Mountain nuclear waste repository 90 miles (140 km) north of Las Vegas. Knapp was rehired by KLAS-TV in 1995 when he left the public relations firm. In 1996, Knapp was described as one of the most prominent news anchors in the Las Vegas area.

In the late 1990s and early 2000s, Knapp worked with the now-defunct group National Institute of Discovery Science (NIDS). Founded by Las Vegas businessman Robert Bigelow, NIDS was charged with scientifically studying unusual phenomena with scientists and funding. Based on his work with NIDS deputy administrator Colm Kelleher, Knapp publicized the so-called Skinwalker Ranch in northeast Utah, where strange events are alleged to have occurred.

In 2009, Knapp was courted by KVBC-TV (Channel 3) who offered him a significantly larger salary than KLAS-TV. Knapp declined the offer, deciding to stay with KLAS-TV.

Knapp has been credited for introducing Nevada senator Harry Reid to Robert Bigelow because of their shared interest in unidentified aerial phenomena.

Knapp co-hosts the UFO-focused "Weaponized" podcast alongside fellow UFO investigator Jeremy Corbell.

In July 2023, Knapp attended a hearing on UFOs at the United States Congress. According to skeptical writer Mick West, "George Knapp was (and still is) very much a believer in aliens, having built a considerable segment of his career in promoting the claims of Area 51 confabulator Bob Lazar as factual". Rolling Stone described Knapp as the "John the Baptist of the UFO movement".

He hosted the Netflix docuseries Investigation Alien in November 2024, which investigated UFO sightings and alien claims.

== Awards ==
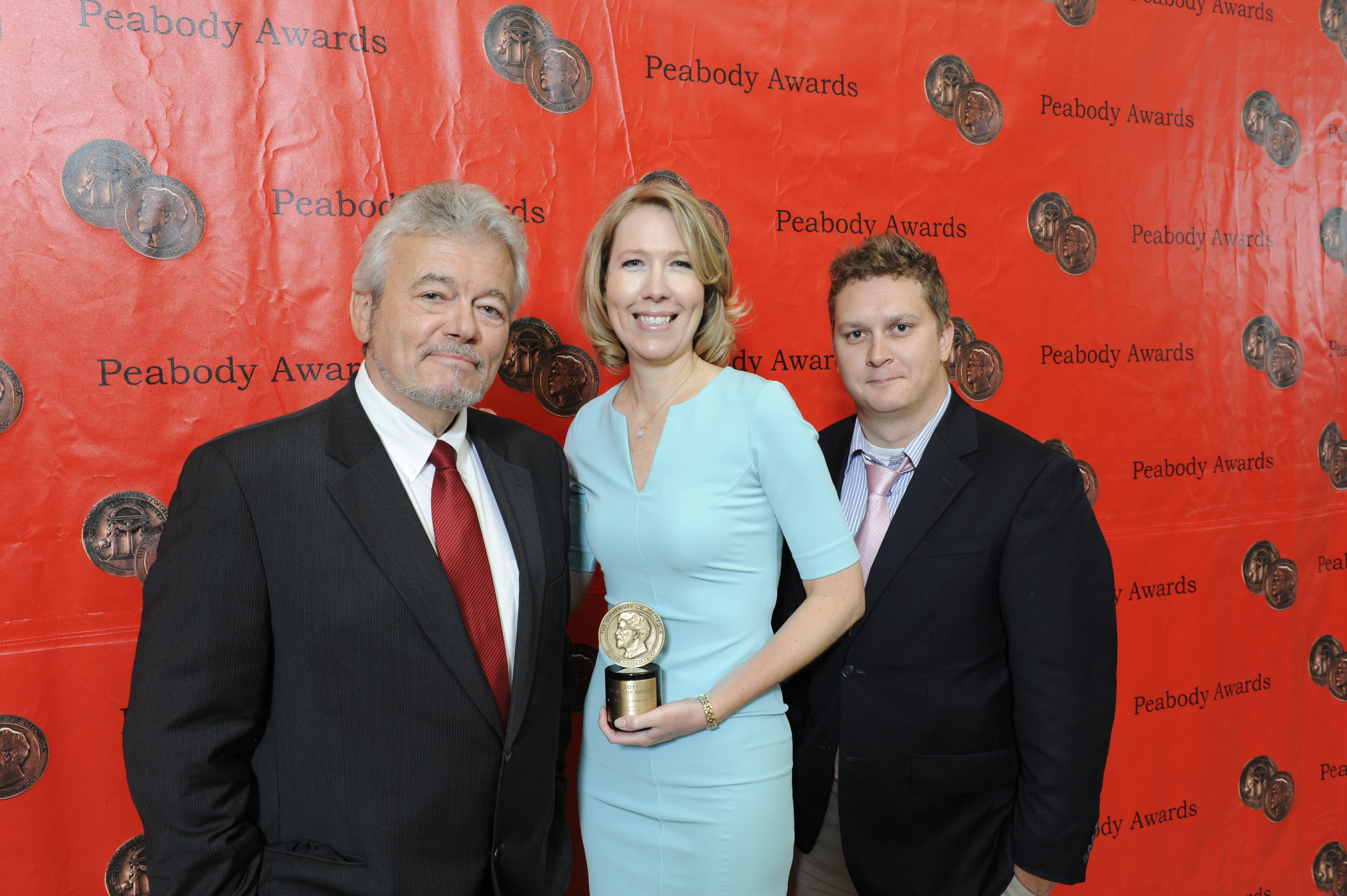
Knapp at the 71st Annual Peabody Awards in 2012

Knapp has won five regional and two national Edward R. Murrow Awards, twenty-four Pacific Southwest Regional Emmy Awards (Regional Emmys), and nine Associated Press Mark Twain Awards. He has also won a DuPont Award from Columbia University and two Peabody Awards.

Knapp and photojournalist Matt Adams were recognized for their work on the investigative series Crossfire: Water, Power, and Politics that received a 2008 Peabody Award.

== Personal life ==
Knapp married his longtime girlfriend Anne "The Viking" Fechner in 2010.
