= UFO sightings in outer space =

UFOs reported by astronauts while in space

Unidentified flying objects have been reported by astronauts while in space. These sightings have been claimed as evidence for extraterrestrial life by ufologists.

Some of the alleged sightings never occurred: science fiction writer Otto Binder perpetuated a hoax claiming Apollo 11 Commander Neil Armstrong had encountered UFOs during the Apollo mission. UFO proponents see comments by astronauts or photos processed by NASA as one of the "strongest bodies of evidence" because they are considered to be of high trustworthiness; however, NASA Assistant Administrator for Legislative Affairs, Robert F. Allnut, concluded in a 1970 letter, "after fifteen years of manned space voyages including space stations and landing on the Moon, spacemen have brought back not a shred of evidence – verbal, photographic, or otherwise – for the existence of extraterrestrial spacecraft, or 'UFOs'."

In 2009, footage from NASA was posted on YouTube by ufologists which "renew[ed] UFO conspiracy theories that the government is hiding knowledge about its interactions with intelligent life" by relying on a "lack of context" to promote a "collection of indistinct imagery and allegations". A number of the incidents were collected for an episode of the 2014 television series Are We Alone?.

== Incidents ==
Some sightings involving astronauts or NASA include:

On 15–16 May 1963, the Mercury-Atlas 9 mission was launched, piloted by astronaut Gordon Cooper. Rumors circulated that Cooper witnessed a greenish object during the flight. Though Cooper had claimed to see unidentified objects while stationed in Germany during his military career, he has dismissed rumors that he had ever witnessed unidentified objects during his tenure as an astronaut, pointing to transcripts of the Mercury 9 flight that were absent any such sightings.

On 18 March 1965, (Note: Oberg makes a minor error in the subsequently cited Skeptical Inquirer article for Voskhod 2, listing 8 March 1964 instead of 18 March 1965 as the date of the mission.) the Voskhod 2 mission launched with Alexei Leonov and Pavel Belyayev aboard, during which Leonov performed the world's first spacewalk. The mission faced a number of unexpected challenges, including technical issues when Leonov attempted to reinsert himself into the airlock following extravehicular activity, complications during atmospheric reentry, and even the risk of exposure while awaiting rescue following touchdown, after which Leonov laconically summarized the feat during a post-mission debrief, "Provided with a special suit, man can survive and work in open space. Thank you for your attention." Despite tight Soviet-era secrecy around their space program, rumors circulated that during the mission, the cosmonauts had reportedly witnessed an unidentified, cylindrical object upon reentry. According to James Oberg, it was likely of earthly origin, and he stressed that the cosmonauts had likewise assumed as such. Oberg also emphasized that the orbital sighting of craft of earthly origin should be understood to have necessarily increased as space activity itself was increasing in frequency.

During the Gemini 4 mission, pilot Jim McDivitt spotted an object that he described as a "white cylindrical shape with a white pole sticking out of one corner of it." He took two pictures of it. His partner, Ed White, was asleep at the time. McDivitt maintains that it was some unknown but man-made piece of debris, while James Oberg argues that it was most likely the Titan II second stage of the craft.

In a transcript of Gemini 7 mission, the astronauts mention a "bogey" which ufologists have claimed was a reference to a UFO. Oberg, based on his trajectory analysis of the mission, describes the astronauts' comments about a "bogey" as referring to booster-associated debris, and not a reference to some sort of UFO. The astronaut who made the comments, Frank Borman, later confirmed that what he saw was not a UFO, and that when he offered to go on the television show Unsolved Mysteries to clarify, the producers told him, "Well, I'm not sure we want you on the program."

During the Apollo 8 mission in December 1968, which was notably the first crewed Saturn V launch, Apollo astronauts orbited the Moon ten times. Upon the thrusters successfully firing when the crew left lunar orbit, astronaut Jim Lovell sent the following transmission: “Roger, please be informed there is a Santa Claus.” It was theorized by some UFO enthusiasts that this was code for the sighting of UFOs or some extraterrestrial phenomenon, but author Duncan Lunan has dismissed the claim, emphasizing it was Christmas and that the use of this phrase had not, to his knowledge, been used by astronauts since.

Within the UFO community, stories have spread that Neil Armstrong was reported to have witnessed multiple UFOs during Apollo 11. According to these stories, Armstrong claimed he saw two blue pale glowing orbs. An explanation was that the sightings could have been attributed to jettisoned components. Additional stories were accredited to a hoax spread by science fiction writer Otto Binder. Buzz Aldrin says his words were taken out of context from an interview in 2005 about the incident. Aldrin said that he "observed a light out the window that appeared alongside [the crew]".

Launched in 1973, Skylab was the first U.S. space station, and Skylab 3 represented the second crewed mission to the orbiting research facility. The crew of Skylab 3 witnessed a "bright reddish object" that appeared "much brighter than Jupiter or any of the other planets", the radiance of which oscillated between peaks and troughs at a period of "almost exactly 10 seconds". (Note: The mission debrief transcript provided by the U.S. Department of Defense implies a period of ten seconds, whereas the later analysis that James Oberg challenges includes other quotes by the astronauts purportedly clarifying a half-period of ten seconds.) Astronaut Owen Garriott further stated that the object was "not more than 30 to 50 nautical miles" (35–58 mi; 56–93 km) away, adding that it "was obviously a satellite in a very similar orbit" to Skylab. He further attested that the duration of the sighting was "about 10 minutes", lasting until Skylab passed into the Earth's umbra, after which the object likewise disappeared into this region "about 5-seconds later". This delay helped the astronauts estimate its distance; the object was not witnessed on any previous or subsequent orbits. Several photographs were taken. James Oberg later offered an explanation, stating that the anomalous details in the clearest image were likely a result of photographic artifacts, while the less detailed images indicated that the object itself was simply a satellite. In a later response to optical physicist and ufologist Bruce Maccabee's analysis of the most detailed photo's anomalies, wherein Maccabee stated that a contemporary satellite would have been incompatible with observations due to the anomalous constraints on the object's size, its movement with regard to orbital mechanics, the ostensible lack of NORAD corroboration, and the inability of Rayleigh scattering to account for the "reddish hue" in this particular instance, Oberg clarified that what the crew had seen was likely debris, while maintaining his previous assertion that anomalies in the most detailed image were probably the result of photographic artifacts.

During the STS-48 mission in 1991, an anomalous point of light was recorded moving within view of Space Shuttle Discovery. The optical phenomenon appeared to make a dramatic turn at an acute angle following a bright flash of light. NASA astronaut Ron Parise, who participated in STS-35 and STS-67, as well as frequent mission control specialist James Oberg both concluded the object was a particle of ice whose trajectory had been affected by the firing of a vernier thruster.

On 25 February 1996, the STS-75 mission's experimental Tethered Satellite System severed. Although the primary objective of the mission was unsuccessful, some ufologists noted anomalous objects in the footage of the event, which they suggested were UFOs. Skeptics pointed out that the scale of the objects, if interpreted this way, would have been massive enough to be visible from the ground. NASA explained that the objects were actually misidentified debris.

In November 1996, Space Shuttle Columbia was launched to fulfill mission STS-80. In December, ground control remotely recorded the presence of apparent anomalous objects using the shuttle's onboard camera equipment. Although James Oberg explained that a roughly circular formation of unknown lights in the footage comprised ice particles, a different part of the footage that appeared to show a high-speed object, which has become known as the "F1 Event", led two scientists to disagree that the ice particle theory could represent an omnibus explanation for all recorded STS-80 activity. Marine scientist and physical oceanographer Edwin Alfonso-Sosa proposed, following detailed analysis, that the object recorded during the F1 Event was of sufficient energy that it couldn't be dismissed as a "low-energy optical artifact", while simultaneously noting that the anomaly didn't produce the expected level of seawater vaporization in the vicinity of its apparent source near the Puerto Rico Trench. Further, the F1 Event and other comparably high-energy transmedium events observed in MODIS satellite surveys were found to have a biased provenance from similar deep sea sources, and the half-petawatt estimated power of the phenomenon, having lacked the expected dramatic physical effects on the surrounding environment, was hypothesized to have been caused by exotic, higher-dimensional anomalies explained within the context of brane cosmology.

Aerospace engineer Mark J. Carlotto also opined on STS-80, agreeing with Oberg that some of the footage could be explained as ice debris, including two objects which were implied to be out-of-focus catadioptric bokeh artifacts; however, he disagreed with the debris explanation regarding the F1 Event and also regarding high-velocity streaks that were analyzed to move in an apparently anomalous retrograde orbit. Unlike Alfonso-Sosa's cosmologically based explanation two decades later, Carlotto proposed a less exotic, ostensibly meteorologically based hypothesis, suggesting the F1 Event could "represent the first observation of a new kind of atmospheric phenomenon from space".

One of the astronauts from the STS-80 mission, planetary scientist Tom Jones, proposed a more prosaic explanation that was more congruous with Oberg's, stating that "images of ice particles or man-made debris drifting out of Columbia's cargo bay, and floating in the vicinity of the shuttle, likely within a few tens of feet of the orbiter" were responsible. In 2026, three photos of an anomalous object from the STS-80 mission were released as part of the ongoing Pentagon UFO files declassification program. The photographs appeared to show an angular, unidentified object; however, it is unclear if it was related to the object from the F1 Event, the circular pattern of lights explained by Oberg, some other previously known anomaly from the mission such as the high-speed streaks in apparent retrograde orbit, or something altogether new. Upon their release in 2026, officials noted the status of the object in these three recently released photos is currently labeled "unresolved".

In December 1998, a photo was captured during the STS-88 mission that appeared to show an anomalous object in orbit. Considered by some ufologists to be the alleged Black Knight satellite, James Oberg offered an explanation for this apparent anomaly as well. He concluded it was space debris, specifically a thermal blanket that was lost during the course of the mission.

During a 2005 spacewalk outside the International Space Station, astronaut Leroy Chiao reported seeing lights in a formation he described as "in a line" and "almost like an upside-down check mark". The incident was promoted as a possible UFO sighting in the television series Are We Alone?. Chiao later identified the lights as being from fishing boats "hundreds of miles below".

In August 2013, astronaut Christopher Cassidy reportedly saw a UFO float past the International Space Station near its Progress 52 cargo ship. It was identified by Russian flight controllers as an antenna cover from the Zvezda service module.

On August 19, 2020, Cosmonaut Ivan Vagner posted a video on Twitter featuring UFOs on a time-lapse he recorded of the Aurora Australis. Vagner dubbed the objects "space guests" with Roscosmos quote tweeting Vagner to say "An interesting and at the same time mysterious video made by the cosmonaut of Roscosmos Ivan Wagner from the International Space Station." Ivan would later post another video clarifying that the UFOs seemed to be satellites.

In May 2026, the Pentagon released UAP/UFO sighting documents and media, some catalogued as being from the lunar surface during the Apollo 12 and Apollo 17 missions.

== See also ==
- List of reported UFO sightings
- STS-48
