= Skinwalker Ranch (film) =

2013 American found footage horror film by Devin McGinn and by Steve Berg

- Directed by: Devin McGinn; Steve Berg
- Written by: Adam Ohler
- Story by: Devin McGinn; Steve Berg; Ken Bretschneider; Murphy Michaels
- Starring: Taylor Bateman; Steve Berg; Michael Black
- Cinematography: Michael Black
- Production company: DeepStudios
- Release date: October 30, 2013
- Running time: 45 minutes 12 seconds
- Country: United States
- Language: English

Skinwalker Ranch (marketed in the UK as Skinwalkers) is a 2013 American found footage science fiction horror film directed by Devin McGinn and by Steve Berg. The movie had a video on demand and limited theatrical release on October 30, 2013, and stars Taylor Bateman, Steve Berg, and Michael Black. It is loosely based upon folklore surrounding the eponymous Utah-based Skinwalker Ranch, which is rumored to be the site of several UFO sightings.

== Synopsis ==
Strange occurrences have been happening on the Skinwalker Ranch, which have culminated in the disappearance of the ranch owner's son. This prompts the dispatch of an investigative team to document the activity and look into the boy's disappearance by way of cameras set up throughout the ranch. The cameras record a series of increasingly eerie events and a warning by a Native American man, who tells the crew that their lives are in danger.

== Cast ==
- Taylor Bateman as Rebecca
- Steve Berg as Sam
- Michael Black as Britton Sloan
- Erin Cahill as Lisa
- Carol Call as Lissie Miller
- Kyle Davis as Ray Reed
- Mike Flynn as Interviewee
- Jon Gries as Hoyt
- Michael Horse as Ahote
- Nash Lucas as Cody
- Devin McGinn as Cameron Murphy
- Matthew Rocheleau as Matt
- Anne Sward as Interviewee
- Tobijah Tyler as Interviewee
- Clint Vanderlinden as Interviewee
- Larry Page, appearing anonymously

== Reception ==
Common criticism of the film centered on the plot, which Shock Till You Drop considered to be due to the over familiarity of films of this nature and of movies purported to be based on true events. The Salt Lake Tribune gave a positive review for Skinwalker Ranch, praising the movie's visual-effects work. Dan Callahan of RogerEbert.com gave a mixed review, remarking that "There is no point in Skinwalker Ranch when it seems as if this could actually be found footage, but it does garner a few scares and even a few honest laughs in its rather short running time. If you're looking for a neat little Halloween movie, you could do worse."
