= First Earth Battalion =

New Age military proposal

First Earth Battalion Field Manual

The First Earth Battalion was the name proposed by Lieutenant Colonel Jim Channon, a U.S. soldier who had served in Vietnam, for his idea of a new military of supersoldiers to be organized along New Age lines. A book of the same name was published in 1982.

== The Men Who Stare at Goats ==
According to the book The Men Who Stare at Goats by journalist Jon Ronson, Channon spent time in the 1970s with many of the people in California credited with starting the Human Potential Movement, and subsequently wrote an operations manual for a First Earth Battalion. The manual was a 125-page mixture of drawings, graphs, maps, polemical essays, and point-by-point redesigns of every aspect of military life. Channon imagined a new battlefield uniform that would include pouches for ginseng regulators, divining tools, foodstuffs to enhance night vision, and a loudspeaker that would automatically emit "indigenous music and words of peace." A movie based on the book—released in Autumn 2009—starring George Clooney, Ewan McGregor, Jeff Bridges and Kevin Spacey, fictionalized the First Earth Battalion as the New Earth Army.

== Beliefs ==
Channon believed the Army could be the principal moral and ethical basis on which politics could harmonize in the name of the Earth. He declared that the First Earth Battalion's primary allegiance was to the planet Earth. Channon envisioned that the First Earth Battalion would organize itself informally: uniforms without uniformity, structure without status, and unity powered by diversity, and members would be multicultural, with each race contributing to "rainbow power". He also proposed as a guiding principle that members of the First Earth Battalion seek nondestructive methods of conflict resolution because their first loyalty is to the planet.

=== Warrior Monk ===
Channon adopted the term "warrior monk" for potential members of the First Earth Battalion.

=== Credo ===
According to the book Mind Wars by Ronald McRae, each member of the First Earth Battalion would be sworn to uphold a credo of "high commandos and guerrilla gurus":

- I have the capacity and therefore the duty to contribute to the development of myself, my associates, and our planet, simultaneously, now!
- I will organize a self-supporting high commando group that will create and perform evolutionary breakthrough actions on behalf of people and planet. One people, one planet.
- I will then pass on this concept to others who are capable of generating further self-organizing commando teams.
- I will await the time when my group can connect naturally with others at higher and higher levels of awareness and performance — the Natural Guard.

== See also ==
- Unconventional warfare
- Psychological warfare
- Irregular military
