= Robert Bigelow =

American businessman (born 1944)

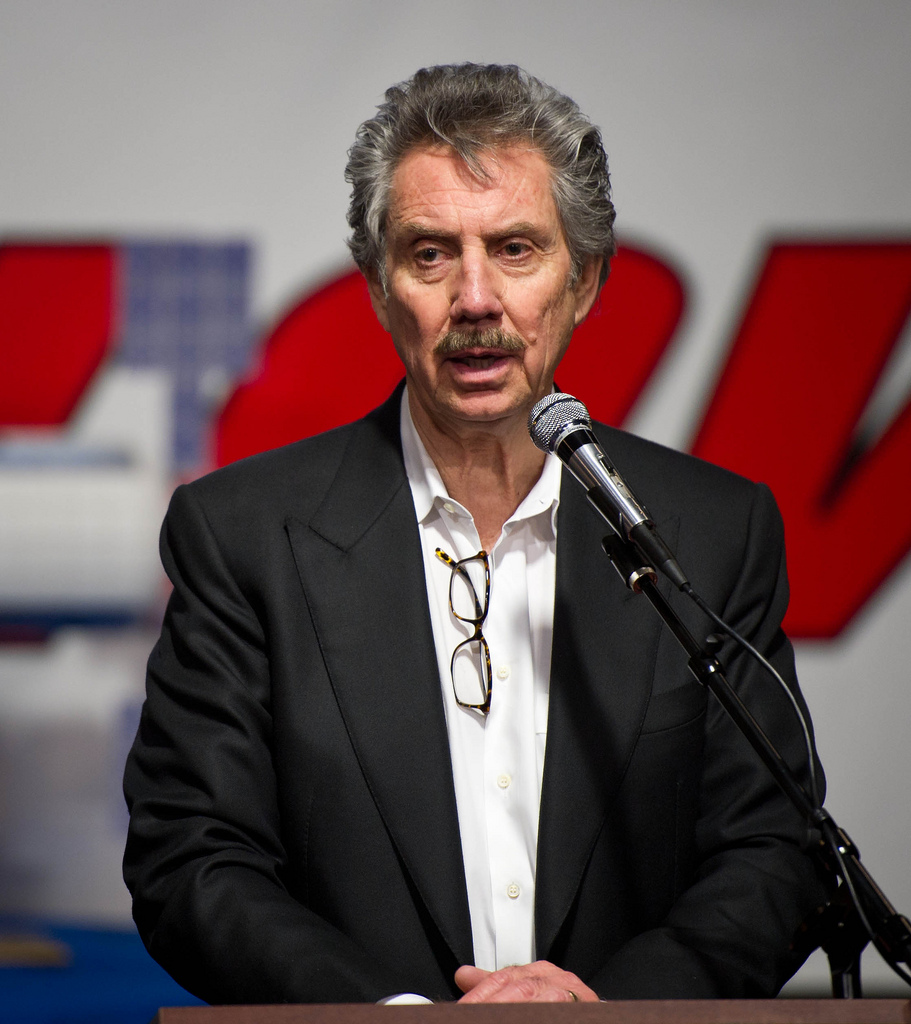
- Bigelow in 2011
- Born: Robert Thomas Bigelow; May 12, 1944 (age 82)
- Education: University of Nevada, Reno; Arizona State University, Tempe (BA)
- Occupation: Businessman
- Spouse: Diane Mona Grammy (m. 1965; died 2020)
- Children: 2

Robert Thomas Bigelow (born May 12, 1944) is an American businessman. He owns Budget Suites of America and is the founder of Bigelow Aerospace.

Bigelow has provided financial support for investigations of UFOs and parapsychological topics, including the continuation of consciousness after death.

== Early life ==
Bigelow grew up in Las Vegas, Nevada, attended Highland Elementary School about 70 miles (100 km) from where nuclear weapons tests were conducted at the Nevada National Security Site nuclear weapons tests, northwest of the city.

He enrolled in the University of Nevada, Reno, in 1962 to study banking and real estate, and he graduated from Arizona State University in 1967.

== Career ==
=== Real estate ===
From the late 1960s through the '90s, Bigelow developed commercial real estate hotels, motels and apartments.

In his real estate career, Bigelow built approximately 15,000 units and purchased another 8,000. For most of his career, he held on to almost everything he bought, but he did sell before the 2008 financial crisis. In 2013, Bigelow reflected on this: "People just really wanted to throw money away, so that was lucky."

==== Budget Suites of America ====
Bigelow owns Budget Suites of America, an extended-stay apartment chain founded in 1987. Its rooms are primarily suites featuring a full kitchen. Budget Suites owns three hotels in Phoenix, Arizona; five in Las Vegas, Nevada; ten in Dallas, Texas; and one in San Antonio, Texas.

=== Aerospace ===
In 1999, Bigelow founded Bigelow Aerospace.

Bigelow had indicated he planned to spend up to US$500 million to develop the first commercial space station with a goal of the station costing 33% of the US$1.5 billion that NASA expended on a single Space Shuttle mission. Bigelow Aerospace has launched two experimental space modules, Genesis I in 2006 and Genesis II in 2007, and had planned for full-scale space habitats to be used as orbital hotels, research labs and factories.

In 2013, Bigelow indicated that the reason he went into the commercial real estate business was to obtain the requisite resources to be able to fund a team developing space destinations. In October 2017, Bigelow announced that he planned to put an inflatable "space hotel" into orbit by 2022. The plan was part of a partnership with United Launch Alliance, and the project was estimated to cost US$2.3 billion in total. The cost of a three-day stay in this spatial hotel was estimated at 5 million dollars.

In April 2016, Bigelow's BEAM module was launched to the International Space Station on the eighth SpaceX cargo resupply mission.

In March 2020, Bigelow Aerospace laid off all 88 members of staff and halted operations after over 20 years of business, in a move that was partially caused by the coronavirus pandemic.

In March 2021, he sued NASA for US$1.05 million, alleging he was not paid according to contract for product testing and development.

=== Anomalies research ===
In 1995, Bigelow founded the National Institute for Discovery Science to fund the research and study of various fringe sciences and paranormal topics, most notably ufology. The organization researched cattle mutilation and black triangle reports, ultimately attributing the latter to secretive advanced aircraft operated by the military. The institute was disbanded in 2004.

In 1996, Bigelow purchased Skinwalker Ranch, a 512-acre (205 ha) cattle ranch located in Utah that is the site of purported paranormal phenomena, such as inter-dimensional shape-shifters, for $200,000. In 2016, Bigelow sold the ranch to Brandon Fugal for $500,000.

In December 2017, Bigelow was reported by The New York Times to have urged Senator Harry Reid to initiate what became the Advanced Aerospace Threat Identification Program, a government study which operated from 2007 to 2012 tasked with the study of UFOs. According to the New York Times, Bigelow said he was “absolutely convinced” that extraterrestrial life exists and that extraterrestrials have visited Earth.

=== Consciousness studies ===
In June 2020, Bigelow founded the Bigelow Institute for Consciousness Studies (BICS) to support investigations into life after death. In January 2021, the institute put up an award of US$1 million asking for essays arguing for existence of a life after death. The institute awarded the first-place $500,000 prize to Jeffrey Mishlove, the second-place prize to Pim van Lommel, and the third-place prize to Leo Ruickbie.

== Personal life ==
On February 4, 1965, he married Diane Mona Grammy (April 9, 1947 – February 19, 2020) of Camden, New Jersey.

They had two children together, Robert Michael "Bobby" Bigelow, and Rod Lee Bigelow. In 1992, Rod Lee Bigelow died by suicide, aged 24. In 2011, Robert Bigelow's grandson, Rod Lee Bigelow II, died by suicide, having suffered from drug addiction.

Diane Bigelow died on February 19, 2020, of myelodysplastic syndrome (MDS) and acute myeloid leukemia (AML).

=== Political contributions ===
Bigelow has made political donations to conservative Republican candidates. In July 2022, he donated $10 million to Florida Republican Governor Ron DeSantis, which was the single biggest donation of his re-election bid. Bigelow has contributed over $25 million to groups and causes supporting Joe Lombardo's candidacy for governor of Nevada. Campaign finance experts believe this may be the most a single donor has spent on a statewide race in modern history. In January 2024 he stated in an interview that he had donated to Donald Trump, "I gave him $1 million towards his legal fees a few weeks ago. I made a promise to give him $20 million more, that will be to the super PAC..."
