= Jim Channon =

United States Army officer (1939–2017)

- Born: September 10, 1939
- Died: September 10, 2017 (aged 78); Hawi, Hawaii, United States
- Alma mater: University of Kentucky
- Military career
- Allegiance: United States
- Branch: United States Army
- Service years: 1962 - 1982
- Rank: Lieutenant Colonel
- Conflicts: Vietnam War

James B. Channon (September 20, 1939- September 10, 2017) was a U.S. Army lieutenant colonel, New Age futurologist, and business consultant. He was primarily known for authoring the First Earth Battalion Operations Manual (1979, and later editions), a popular book pointing the way toward a New Age transformation in the U.S. military. The graphic-heavy publication was inspired by Stewart Brand's Whole Earth Catalog.

== Biography ==
Channon received a B.A. in fine art and an M.A. in behavioral communications from the University of Kentucky. He also held a Master of Military Arts and Sciences (M.M.A.S.) degree from the United States Army Command and General Staff College and a Master of Strategic Studies (M.S.S.) degree from the United States Army War College.

He served in the U.S. Army as an infantry officer from 1962 to 1982 and completed two tours in the Vietnam War (1965–66 and 1970–71), with the 173rd Airborne Brigade. His work and philosophy during his last years on active duty were documented by journalist Jon Ronson in his 2004 book The Men Who Stare at Goats. According to Ronson's book, Channon spent time between 1977 and 1979 with many of the people in California credited with starting the human potential movement (including forays to the Esalen Institute) and in 1979 wrote a 125-page "operations manual" for a proposed "First Earth Battalion".

His concept was that a new generation of "warrior monks" would utilize countercultural principles to better prevail in future conflicts with the nation's adversaries. At a subsequent 1979 briefing at the Fort Knox officer's club, Channon presented his concepts to "commanders", who (he claims) immediately made him the first commander of the First Earth Battalion. (Channon has also told a slightly different version of this story which takes place during a meeting of the "think tank" Task Force Delta, which first convened in 1983 and occurred at Fort Leavenworth, Kansas.)

After retiring from the Army, Channon continued to promote his concepts and worked as an "organizational transformation consultant" to such companies as AT&T, Du Pont, and Whirlpool. In 1990, he was featured in Fortune magazine as the business world's first corporate shaman. He was described as specializing in "helping managers express their vision by creating a picture that makes corporate goals tangible against a starry universe or earthscape background. But at heart he sees himself as a shaman."

He was featured in Omni and other magazine/websites as the founder of the Army's First Earth Battalion.

In a 2004 video interview with Ronson, Channon said that he was still consulted by "top brass" ("like the Chief of Staff of the Army") and was still officially the commander of the First Earth Battalion.
