= Alex Klokus =

American entrepreneur

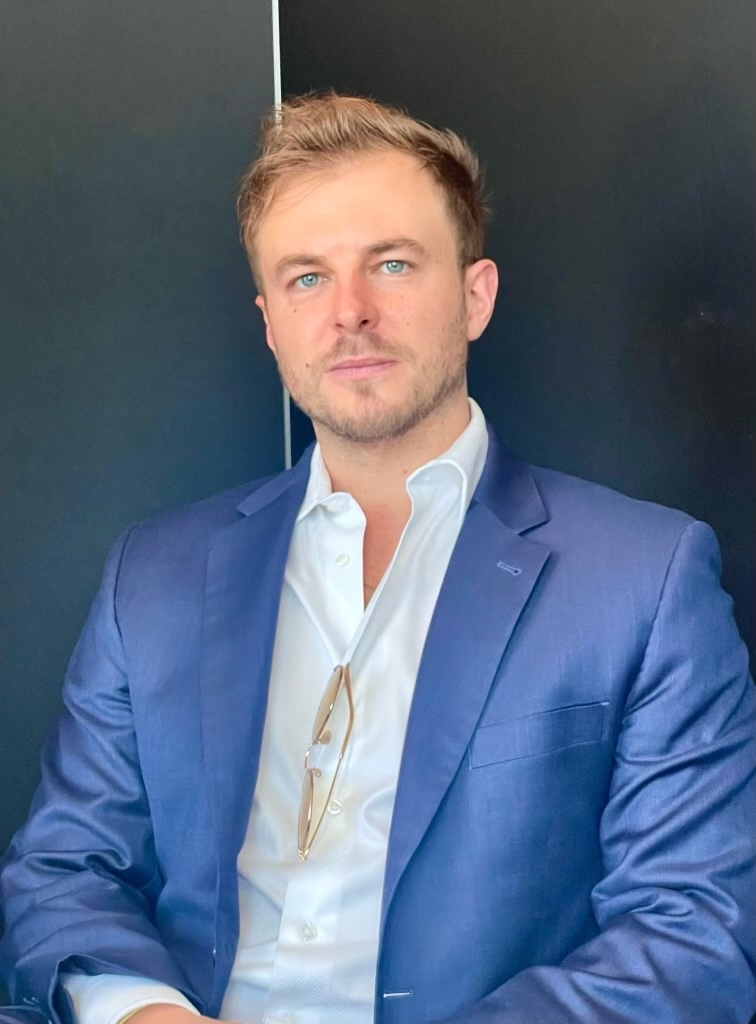
- Alex Klokus in 2023
- Education: New York University
- Occupations: Entrepreneur, investor, media executive, executive producer
- Known for: Founding Futurism, Gravity Blanket, SALT fund
- Notable work: Trust Machine: The Story of Blockchain, I Am Human

Alex Klokus is an American entrepreneur and executive producer. He is the co-founder of the technology news website Futurism, and co-founded Gravity Blanket. In 2017, Klokus was inducted into the Forbes 30 Under 30 in its media category alongside his Futurism co-founder Jordan Lejuwaan. Klokus is currently a founder and managing partner of the SALT fund. Klokus is a moderator at the SALT iConnections conference and World Government Summit.

== Education ==
Klokus received his undergraduate degree from New York University's Stern School of Business, where he was inducted into Beta Gamma Sigma in its 2012-2013 induction year.

== Corporate ventures ==
=== Futurism ===
Alex Klokus and Jordan Lejuwaan founded the technology news website Futurism through a Knight Foundation grant in 2017. Klokus and Lejuwaan were inducted into the media category of Forbes 30 Under 30 in 2017.

That same year, documents released by the United States Justice Department show that Klokus had email correspondence and in-person meetings with Jeffrey Epstein. Published documents reveal that Klokus met with Epstein in September 2017. Additional correspondence from October 2017 shows Klokus introducing technology entrepreneur Bryan Johnson, an investor in Futurism, to Epstein via email and facilitating a meeting between the two.

Futurism was acquired by Singularity University in 2019, before subsequently being sold to Recurrent Ventures in July 2021.

=== SALT ===
Alex Klokus is a founder and managing partner of the SALT fund.

=== Other ventures ===
Alongside AJ Scaramucci, Klokus co-founded "The Pineapple Palace" co-working space and a startup called Pandos. Klokus co-founded the cryptocurrency investment fund Kyber Capital.

== Film production and conference moderation ==
Alex Klokus has served as executive producer on multiple films, one of which won a Best Feature award and debuted at the Tribeca Film Festival. He has hosted multiple SkyBridge Alternatives Conference panels and also served as a moderator for the 2019 World Government Summit.

=== Film production ===
In 2018, Klokus executive produced the 2018 documentary film Trust Machine: The Story of Blockchain alongside Zach LeBeau, Arie Levy-Cohen, and Joseph Lubin. The film, which was written and directed by British American actor Alex Winter, covers the evolution of blockchain technology and its divisive nature while considering whether it is an economic bubble.

The following year he served as executive producer for the documentary I Am Human, which debuted at the 2019 Tribeca Film Festival to wide acclaim, alongside American director Geoff Clark. I Am Human follows the medical cases of three patients undergoing complex experimental brain treatments with the goal of regaining lost abilities, including body movement and vision. Praised as "an optimistic, wholesome antidote to fearmongering", the film contemplates the existential question "What makes us human?" The film won Best Director at the Oslo Film Festival and Best Feature at the Other Worlds Film Festival in Austin, Texas.

=== Conference moderation ===
In 2021, Klokus moderated a SkyBridge Alternatives Conference discussion with American theoretical physicist Michio Kaku about the future of humanity. The following year, Klokus moderated two discussions: a discussion with Rick Doblin of the Multidisciplinary Association for Psychedelic Studies about the promise psychedelic substances might have for mental health treatments, and an interview with Harvard theoretical physicist Avi Loeb discussing the Galileo Project and whether humanity is alone in the universe. In 2023, he hosted Stanford Professor Dr. Garry Nolan and, the following year, retired Lieutenant colonel Karl Nell, a former member of the Unidentified Aerial Phenomena Task Force, about their experiences and beliefs relating to unidentified flying objects.
