= Trust Machine: The Story of Blockchain =

- Directed by: Alex Winter
- Written by: Alex Winter
- Produced by: Kim Jackson; Geoff Clark
- Narrated by: Rosario Dawson
- Cinematography: Anghel Decca
- Edited by: Tim Strube
- Music by: Bill Laswell
- Production companies: Futurism Studios; SingularDTV
- Distributed by: SingularDTV
- Release dates: 26 October 2018 (Cinema Village, New York)
- Running time: 84 minutes
- Country: United States
- Language: English

Trust Machine: The Story of Blockchain is a 2018 American documentary film written and directed by British American actor Alex Winter. The film covers the evolution of blockchain technology and its divisive nature while considering whether it is an economic bubble.

== Premise ==
Trust Machine: The Story of Blockchain uses the cryptocurrency Bitcoin as an entry point to explain the concept of blockchain. The film begins Bitcoin's creator, Satoshi Nakamoto, publishing a white paper during the 2008 financial crisis, outlining the original protocol for what would become Bitcoin. The documentary chronicles Bitcoin's history from its inception and first brush with fame through the infamous Silk Road marketplace on the darknet. It also explores government resistance to the idea of a decentralized currency, illustrated through the cases of activists Lauri Love and Aaron Swartz.

The film also delves into Ethereum, non-financial market use cases, and the advent of smart contracts, highlighting how musical artists like Imogen Heap hope these technologies can "help fix the carnage Napster caused [by] letting fans support artists directly with micropayments"—in other words, offering "a way for fans to buy equity in an artist they like." To keep viewer interest, Trust Machine also introduces various real-world applications of blockchain technology, such as controlling microgrids of electrical transmission, combating identity theft through "self-sovereign identity" platforms, and providing stateless refugees with official identities independent of their nations of origin.

Trust Machine underscores the blockchain's perceived potential while also acknowledging the skepticism and challenges it faces, discussing the public perception of Bitcoin as a tool for illicit activities and the media's focus on its speculative bubble aspects.

== Production ==
Trust Machine: The Story of Blockchain was produced by Futurism's Geoff Clark, SingularDTV's Kim Jackson, and Alex Winter. The film was executive produced by Zach LeBeau, Arie Levy-Cohen, Alex Klokus and Joseph Lubin.

== Critical reception ==
Trust Machine received generally positive reviews from film critics, earning a Metacritic score of 62, indicating "generally favorable" reviews, and a Rotten Tomatoes score of 90 percent.

In a review published two days prior to the film's debut, The Hollywood Reporter considered Trust Machine to be an "eye open[ing]" and "engaging" documentary for broad audiences about cryptocurrency, specifically blockchains and Bitcoin. The publication noted that the film was "refreshingly unconvinced by [the] hype" that surrounds cryptocurrency but "still awed by blockchain's potential."

Similarly, in a review for the Los Angeles Times, film critic Gary Goldstein largely concurred with the Hollywood Reporter, calling the film a "fast-paced, globe-hopping documentary" that effectively used "plenty of words, examples and context to help define" the "complex subject [of] blockchain technology." Goldstein praised the "well-assembled" film from a "capable writer-director", highlighting Rosario Dawson's "crisply" delivered narration. He acknowledged the difficulty less initiated viewers might face in fully grasping "what they’ve just learned," attributing this challenge to the "elusive concept of blockchain" itself rather than to any fault of the film.

In contrast, New York Times critic Ben Kenigsberg provided a dissenting review, describing Trust Machine as a "hodgepodge of boosterish arguments." However, Kenigsberg concurred with Goldstein that the film "does a decent job of explaining the basic concept" of blockchain technology. He felt that while the film discussed the need for "some form of regulation [for blockchain] to survive," it became "an unwitting endorsement of the status quo" in its attempt to address this issue.

The Hollywood Reporter further emphasized that Trust Machine illustrated "how beautiful inventions can be twisted by entrenched powers" and considered the film's overall message to be one of hope—hope that "if more people are paying attention this time around, blockchain might remain a tool for popular empowerment."
