= I Am Human (film) =

- Directed by: Taryn Southern, Elena Gaby
- Written by: Taryn Southern; Elena Gaby
- Produced by: Taryn Southern; Elena Gaby
- Starring: Bryan Johnson; David Eagleman; Ramez Naam; Tristan Harris; Nita Farahany; John Donoghue
- Cinematography: Joel Froome
- Edited by: Cody Rogowski; Wyatt Rogowski
- Music by: Pierre Takal
- Production company: Futurism
- Release date: 2 May 2019 (Tribeca Film Festival)
- Running time: 1 hour 30 minutes
- Country: United States
- Language: English

I Am Human is an American documentary film that debuted at the Tribeca Film Festival in 2019. Directed, produced, and written by Taryn Southern and Elena Gaby, it featured Bryan Johnson, David Eagleman, Ramez Naam, Tristan Harris, Nita Farahany, and John Donoghue. The documentary film discusses how neurotechnology could be used to help restore sight, retrain the body, and treat diseases.

== Description ==
I Am Human follows the medical cases of three patients undergoing complex experimental brain treatments with the goal of regaining lost abilities, including body movement and vision. The documentary follows Bill, a man who became quadriplegic following a bicycle accident, who successfully had use of his arms and hands restored by a brain implant; Anne, who has Parkinson's disease but had its symptoms managed through technology; and Stephen, who lost his eyesight due to a neurological condition. Viewers are brought into the labs of around a dozen scientists working to overcome the technical challenges involved with "creating hardware for inside a human skull". It contemplates the existential question "what makes us human?"

I Am Human was the directoral debut of Taryn Southern and Elena Gaby, both of whom also produced and wrote the film. It was executive produced by Alex Klokus, the founder of the technology media company Futurism, and the American director Geoff Clark. Shortly before the film's premiere, The Film Company acquired its worldwide distribution rights. The film contains interviews with entrepreneur Bryan Johnson, neuroscientists David Eagleman and John Donoghue, author Ramez Naam, computer scientist Tristan Harris, and professor Nita Farahany.

== Release ==
I Am Human was debuted at the 2019 Tribeca Film Festival to wide acclaim. The documentary film has subsequently become the topic of screenings and expert panel discussion at multiple higher education institutions and international standards organizations ranging from the Institute of Electrical and Electronics Engineers to Case Western Reserve University (2020) and Harvard University (2021). It was screened at the Utah Film Center.

In a review for The Verge, senior tech and policy editor Adi Robertson considered I Am Human to be "an optimistic, wholesome antidote to fearmongering" that had "a refreshing focus on people". Robertson lauded its "fundamentally optimistic" nature with relation to neuroscience and brain medicine. I Am Human won the award for Best Director at the Oslo Film Festival and won Best Feature at the Other Worlds Film Festival in Austin, Texas.
