= David Grusch UFO whistleblower claims =

Former U.S. military intelligence officer's claims about "non-human" spacecraft recovery

David Grusch testifying in a 2023 hearing before the U.S. House Committee on Oversight and Accountability

David Grusch is a former United States Air Force (USAF) officer and intelligence official who has claimed that the U.S. federal government, in collaboration with private aerospace companies, has highly secretive special access programs involved in the recovery and reverse engineering of "non-human" spacecraft and their dead pilots, and that people have been threatened and killed in order to conceal these programs. Grusch further claims to have viewed documents reporting a spacecraft of alien origin had been recovered by Benito Mussolini's government in 1933 and procured by the U.S. in 1944 or 1945 with the assistance of the Vatican and the Five Eyes alliance.

The National Aeronautics and Space Administration (NASA) and the U.S. Department of Defense (DoD) have both denied Grusch's claims, stating there are no such programs and that extraterrestrial life has not been discovered. No evidence supporting Grusch's UFO claims has been presented, and they have been dismissed by multiple independent experts.

== Background ==
David Charles Grusch is an Afghanistan combat veteran and a former USAF intelligence officer who worked in the National Geospatial-Intelligence Agency (NGA) and the National Reconnaissance Office (NRO). From 2019 to 2021, he was the representative of the NRO to the Unidentified Aerial Phenomena Task Force. He assisted in drafting the National Defense Authorization Act of 2023, which includes provisions for reporting of UFOs, including whistleblower protections and exemptions to non-disclosure orders and agreements. Congressional interest in UFO sightings immediately prior to Grusch's public claims surrounded questions about the four objects that the Air Force shot down in February 2023.

== Grusch's claims ==
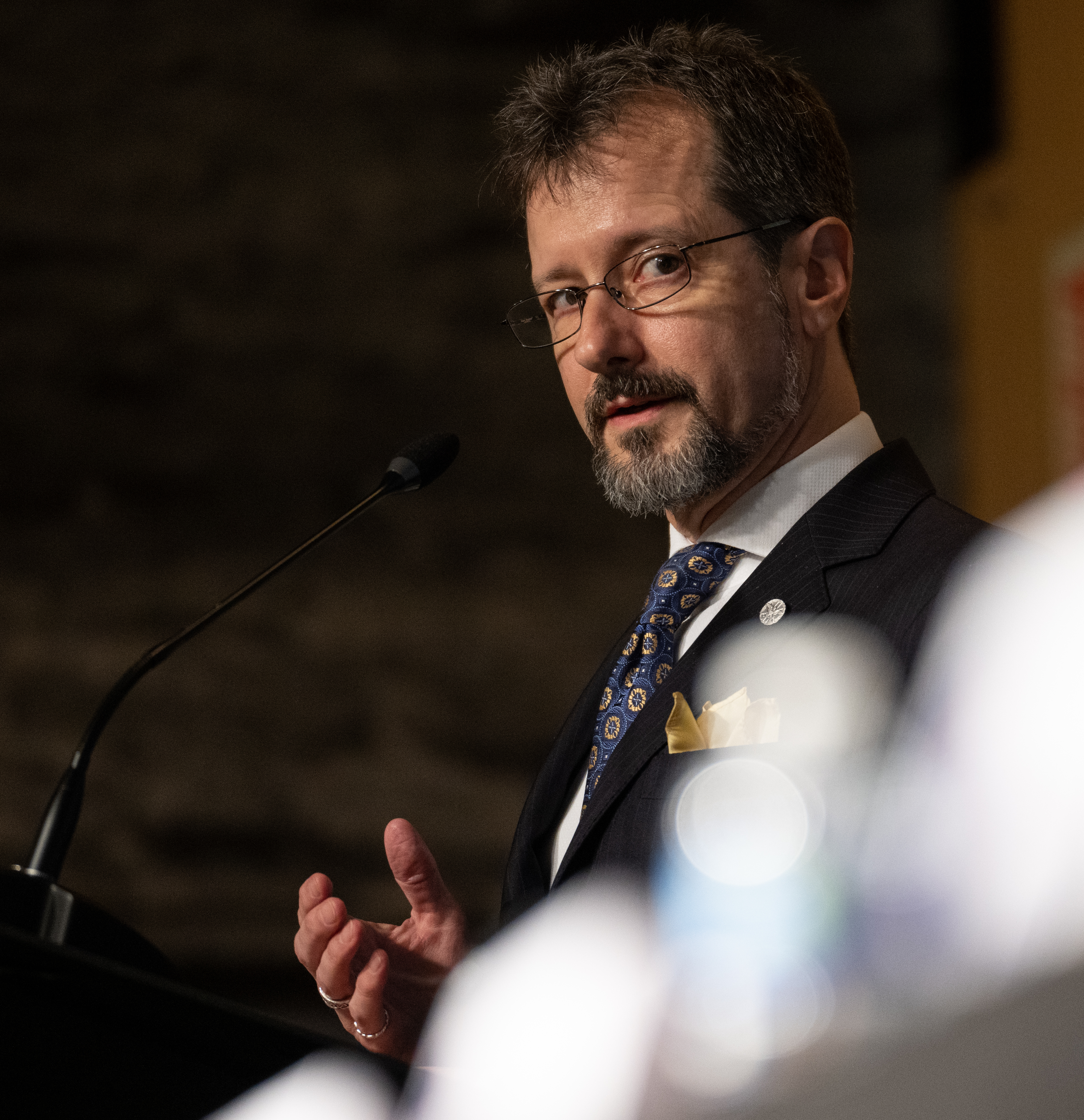
Sean Kirkpatrick, director of AARO tasked with reporting findings to Congress

On June 5, 2023, independent journalists Leslie Kean and Ralph Blumenthal provided a story detailing Grusch's claims of a UFO coverup by the government to The Debrief, a website that describes itself as "self-funded" and specializing in "frontier science". The New York Times and Politico declined to publish the story, while The Washington Post was taking more time to conduct fact-checking than Kean and Blumenthal felt could be afforded because, according to Kean, "people on the internet were spreading stories, Dave was getting harassing phone calls, and we felt the only way to protect him was to get the story out". According to Kean, she vetted Grusch by interviewing Karl Nell, a retired Army colonel who was also on the UFO task force, and "Jonathan Grey" (a pseudonym) whom Kean described as "a current U.S. intelligence official at the National Air and Space Intelligence Center (NASIC)". Kean wrote that Nell called Grusch "beyond reproach" and that both Nell and "Grey" supported Grusch's claim about a secret UFO retrieval and reverse engineering program.

Grusch claims that the U.S. federal government maintains a highly secretive UFO retrieval program and possesses multiple spacecraft of what he calls "non-human" origin as well as corpses of deceased pilots. He also claims there is "substantive evidence that white-collar crime" took place to conceal UFO programs and that he had interviewed officials who said that people had been killed to conceal the programs.

Grusch elaborated on his claims in a subsequent interview with the French newspaper Le Parisien on June 7. He said that UFOs could be coming from extra dimensions; that he had spoken with intelligence officials whom the U.S. military had briefed on "football-field" sized crafts; that the U.S. government transferred some crashed UFOs to a defense contractor; and that there was "malevolent activity" by UFOs.

During a July 26, 2023, Congressional hearing, Grusch said that he "was informed in the course of my official duties of a multi-decade UAP crash retrieval and reverse-engineering program to which I was denied access" and that he believed that the U.S. government was in possession of UAP based on his interviews with 40 witnesses over four years. He claimed in response to Congressional questions that the U.S. has retrieved what he terms "non-human 'biologics'" from the crafts and that this "was the assessment of people with direct knowledge on the [UAP] program I talked to, that are currently still on the program". When Representative Tim Burchett asked him if he had "personal knowledge of people who've been harmed or injured in efforts to cover up or conceal" the government's possession of "extraterrestrial technology", Grusch said yes, but that he was not able to provide details except within a SCIF (sensitive compartmented information facility).

BBC Radio 4's The World Tonight on August 3, 2023, interviewed Grusch. When asked about the U.S. having "intact and partially intact alien vehicles in its possession", Grusch repeated his claims.

At a June 9, 2026 press conference Grusch gave details on the nature of supposed alien life-forms which he stated the US government knew of.

== Responses from relevant experts ==
Grusch's assertions are primarily based on alleged documents and his claimed conversations, rather than testable evidence. Claims that the government is engaged in a conspiratorial effort to conceal evidence of extraterrestrial visitation to Earth are broadly considered untrue by the majority of the scientific community, because such claims oppose the best currently available expert information.

Joshua Semeter of NASA's UAP independent study team and professor of electrical and computer engineering with Boston University's College of Engineering concludes that "without data or material evidence, we are at an impasse on evaluating these claims" and that, "in the long history of claims of extraterrestrial visitors, it is this level of specificity that always seems to be missing". Adam Frank, a professor of astrophysics at the University of Rochester, published a critique of the Grusch claims on June 22, 2023 with Big Think. Frank writes that he does "not find these claims exciting at all" because they are all "just hearsay" where "a guy says he knows a guy who knows another guy who heard from a guy that the government has alien spaceships". Frank also said of the Grusch account that "it's an extraordinary claim, and it requires extraordinary evidence, none of which we're getting", adding "show me the spaceship".

The Guardian printed an opinion piece by Stuart Clark about Grusch's claims which included questions from three scientists. Harvard University astronomer Avi Loeb, who co-founded the UFO-investigating Galileo Project, noted that nothing extraterrestrial has been observed. Radio astronomer Michael Garrett noted that crashed landings of alien craft "would imply that there must be hundreds of them coming every day, and astronomers simply don't see them". Sara Russell, a planetary scientist from the Natural History Museum in London, said that, "if you give me an alloy, it would take me less than half an hour to tell you what elements are in it", and that "it should be easy to understand whether something falling to Earth is man-made or extraterrestrial, and if it is the latter, whether it is naturally occurring or not".

Greg Eghigian, a history professor at Pennsylvania State University and expert in the history of UFOs as it occurs in the context of public fascination, notes that there have been many instances over recent decades in the U.S. of people "who previously worked in some kind of federal department" coming forward to make "bombshell allegations" about the truth regarding UFOs with the whistleblower claims by Grusch fitting this pattern. Eghigian describes the 1940s–50s media enthusiasm about flying saucers, and comments that the successful books on the subject by authors Donald Keyhoe, Frank Scully, and Gerald Heard "provided the model for a new kind of public figure: the crusading whistleblower dedicated to breaking the silence over the alien origins of unidentified flying objects." Since then all these similarly credentialed claimants have been unable to provide any further corroboration. Eghigian said that "a new kind of sobriety needs to be interjected here" and that the Grusch story "ups the ante" but is "very hard to take seriously unless we start getting some real evidence that's of a forensic nature to prove these things".

Seth Shostak, the senior astronomer at the SETI Institute writing on MSNBC.com about Grusch's claims, said that the claims are extraordinary, before asking, "But where is the evidence? It's MIA. Neither Grusch nor anyone else claiming to have knowledge of secret government UAP programs has ever been able to publicly produce convincing photos showing alien hardware splayed across the landscape. And remember, we're not talking about a Cessna that plowed into a wheat field. We're talking about, presumably, an alien interstellar rocket, capable of bridging trillions of miles of space, and sporting technology that is obviously alien". Shostak concluded that, "from the standpoint of science, there's still no good evidence [that extraterrestrials are visiting the Earth], only an 'argument from authority'". Michael Shermer, publisher of Skeptic magazine, said of the July 26, 2023, congressional hearing that "it's astonishing it's come this far without any real evidence, without anybody in the scientific community making an appearance" and "we are still seeing not a shred of physical evidence".

The physicist and cosmologist Sean M. Carroll said of Grusch's claims about alien visitors, "the evidence is laughable". Grusch was "talking about the holographic principle and extra dimensions and stuff like that" which should "set off your alarm bells," he said. He concluded that Grusch "has all of the vibes of a complete crackpot".

Laurie Leshin, Jet Propulsion Laboratory (JPL) director for NASA, when asked by reporter in August 2023 if she had "seen spacecraft made from outside of this world", replied "Absolutely not. No." with a laugh and head shake.

Physicist and popular science writer Michio Kaku said "so far we have not seen the smoking gun" to prove any of Grusch's claims. However, he also suggested that "the burden of proof has shifted, now the Pentagon has to prove these things aren't extra-terrestrial". That prompted Real Clear Science editor Ross Pomeroy to comment, "no, the burden of proof has not shifted. Aliens are not the default explanation when a simpler explanation readily does the job". According to Pomeroy, "Kaku is seriously jeopardizing his reputation and misleading the public through his unscientific new stance on UFOs."

== Responses from the United States government ==
=== Department of Defense and NASA ===
White House Press Secretary Karine Jean-Pierre referred questions about Grusch's complaint to the Department of Defense (DoD). In a statement, Sue Gough, spokesperson for the Pentagon, said: "To date, AARO (All-domain Anomaly Resolution Office) has not discovered any verifiable information to substantiate claims that any programs regarding the possession or reverse-engineering of any extraterrestrial materials have existed in the past or exist currently. AARO is committed to following the data and its investigation wherever it leads."

General Mark Milley, the chairman of the Joint Chiefs of Staff, gave an interview to The Washington Times on August 6, 2023, in which he stated that he had never encountered evidence that would verify the claims made by Grusch regarding "quote-unquote 'aliens' or that there's some sort of cover-up program". Milley added that he was unsurprised that such rumors would circulate and be believed by some within an organization as large as the U.S. military.

NASA stated: "One of NASA's key priorities is the search for life elsewhere in the universe, but so far, NASA has not found any credible evidence of extraterrestrial life and there is no evidence that UAPs are extraterrestrial. However, NASA is exploring the solar system and beyond to help us answer fundamental questions, including whether we are alone in the universe."

=== Congress ===
In response to Grusch's claims, Representative Mike Turner, the chairman of the House Permanent Select Committee on Intelligence, said, "every decade there's been individuals who've said the United States has such pieces of unidentified flying objects that are from outer space" and that "there's no evidence of this and certainly it would be quite a conspiracy for this to be maintained, especially at this level".

Senator Lindsey Graham found the claims unreasonable, saying, "If we'd really found this stuff, there's no way you could keep it from coming out". Senator Josh Hawley said, "I'm not surprised, necessarily, by these latest allegations, because it sounds pretty close to what they kind of grudgingly admitted to us in the briefing". Some senators, though not concerned about Grusch's specific claims, were concerned that Congress might not have been briefed on special access programs. Senator Kirsten Gillibrand, who led a Senate hearing on UFOs in April 2023, said she intends to hold a hearing to assess whether "rogue SAP programs" existed "that no one is providing oversight for". Senator Marco Rubio, vice-chair of the Senate Select Committee on Intelligence said, "there are people who have come forward to share information with our committee over the last couple of years" with "first-hand knowledge" and that they were "potentially some of the same people perhaps" referred to by Grusch.

In July 2023, Senate Majority Leader Chuck Schumer and Senator Mike Rounds led a proposed 64-page amendment to the 2024 National Defence Authorization Act, named the UAP Disclosure Act 2023, which proposes wider access to records of UAP and federal government ownership of any "recovered technologies of unknown origin". The enrolled bill directs the National Archives to collect government documents about "unidentified anomalous phenomena, technologies of unknown origin, and non-human intelligence".

On January 13, 2024, members of the House Oversight Committee's national security subcommittee received a classified briefing from the Intelligence Community Inspector General (IC IG) Thomas A. Monheim regarding UAP reporting transparency. Some members said they were frustrated by the lack of new information regarding Grusch's allegations.

=== 2023 House Committee Oversight and Accountability hearing ===
On behalf of the United States House Committee on Oversight and Accountability and in response to Grusch's claims, Representatives Anna Paulina Luna and Tim Burchett organized a hearing on July 26, 2023.

Grusch testified at the hearing along with other witnesses, during which he repeated his earlier UFO claims. Representative Alexandria Ocasio-Cortez asked the witnesses, "If you were me, where would you look?" regarding evidence to validate their claims. Grusch replied, "I'd be happy to give you that in a closed environment. I can tell you specifically." Following the hearing, and according to Burchette, officials informed the lawmakers "that Grusch doesn't currently have security clearance to discuss the issues in a SCIF". Following the hearing a bipartisan group of U.S. representatives called for the formation of a select committee on UAPs with subpoena power.

Following the hearing, AARO's director Sean Kirkpatrick wrote on his LinkedIn page that, "contrary to assertions made in the hearing", Grusch "has refused to speak with AARO" so that some details said to have been given to Congress had not been provided to his office and also that the hearing was "insulting ...to the officers of the Department of Defense and Intelligence Community who chose to join AARO, many with not unreasonable anxieties about the career risks this would entail".

== Sean Kirkpatrick ==
In 2024, after retiring from AARO, Kirkpatrick wrote an opinion piece for Scientific American in which he said that the US Government UFO coverup allegations "derive from inadvertent or unauthorized disclosures of legitimate U.S. programs or related R&D that have nothing to do with extraterrestrial issues or technology. Some are misrepresentations, and some derive from pure, unsupported beliefs. In many respects, the narrative is a textbook example of circular reporting, with each person relaying what they heard, but the information often ultimately being sourced to the same small group of individuals." Kirkpatrick further described the allegations' supporters as "a small group of interconnected believers and others with possibly less than honest intentions," who promote a "whirlwind of tall tales, fabrication and secondhand or thirdhand retellings".

In a 2024 interview with Peter Bergen, Kirkpatrick said about Grusch:

He's one of the individuals that I think this kind of, this core group of people have influenced him, have told him this information. He may have misinterpreted things that people have said, or he may have just fallen into the influence of what these folks have been telling him. At either event, at the time I left he had not come in to speak to AARO.

Burgen further characterized what Kirkpatrick was saying as an ironic twist on conspiracy theories about government cover ups. "The true believer about UFO's thinks that there is a government conspiracy to hide real evidence of aliens. What Kirkpatrick is saying is the actual conspiracy is being carried out by a group of UFO true believers to get the government involved in the business of investigating aliens." Burgen suggested to Kirkpatrick that this might be, in Pentagon jargon, a "self-licking ice cream cone", a non-productive endeavor that only perpetuates its own existence. To which Kirkpatrick responded "That is a self licking ice cream cone, exactly."

== Media reporting on Grusch's claims ==
=== Connections to studies funded by Robert Bigelow ===
Keith Kloor writing for the Scientific American on August 25, 2023, draws a line from "these outlandish assertions" by Grusch "to the vast repository of so-called studies" funded over past years by Robert Bigelow. Kloor also points to the specific references to "a football field–sized UFO" showing up in one of the claims made by Grusch and in past claims by Bigelow.

=== Reporting on psychiatric treatment received by Grusch ===
Ken Klippenstein reported in The Intercept, that Grusch was twice committed after incidents in 2014 and 2018 that involved drunkenness and suicidal comments. Police records mentioned post-traumatic stress disorder (PTSD). After the incident in 2018, Grusch was placed under an emergency custody order and transported to an emergency room. A mental health specialist requested a temporary detention order, whereupon Grusch was transferred to Loudoun Adult Medical Psychiatric Services, an inpatient program in the Inova Loudoun Cornwall Medical Campus in Leesburg. The article in The Intercept noted that "Grusch's ability to keep his security clearance" despite this history "appears to contrast with the government's treatment of other employees". In 2024, Grusch sued Loudoun County Sheriff Mike Chapman and an unidentified Sheriff’s Office employee for $2.5 million for releasing the information to Klippenstein.

=== News stories and commentary ===
The British journalist Nick Pope, who previously ran the British Ministry of Defense "UFO Desk", initially expressed hope for confirmation or disconfirmation of Grusch's claims, but now that Grusch has lost his security clearance and there is still no "smoking gun" Pope says it is difficult to see how the claims could be confirmed. He added that while he was at the Ministry of Defense if the US government had acquired craft and bodies, "they didn't tell the UK".

Marina Koren wrote in The Atlantic that the case fits a long pattern of previous unprovable claims and that, "so far, the best evidence [Grusch has] come up with, besides his own word, is the government's denial". Matt Laslo, writing for Wired, described the sympathetic hearing of Grusch's claims by some members of Congress as an indication that in "our strange new political universe of alternative facts turned dystopian reality, once-fringe notions have built-in fan bases in today's Capitol". The conservative political commentator Tucker Carlson publicized the claims in a video posted to Twitter, and in a video interview of Grusch. Tom Rogan, writing in the Washington Examiner, was skeptical regarding Grusch's claims, but opined that they should be further investigated.

Andrew Prokop, a political news correspondent for Vox, wrote on June 10 that, "skeptics question whether Grusch is just repeating tall tales that have long circulated through the UFO-believing community, suggesting he may be just a gullible sap (if not an outright fabulist)." Prokop went on to state that, "mainstream media sources have so far remained wary of Grusch – The New York Times, Washington Post, and Politico were all offered his story but none thought it was publishable. The Debrief, which published it, is a notably UFO-friendly outlet, as are Leslie Kean and Ralph Blumenthal, the two journalists who wrote the story. And purported bombshells like this in the past have tended to fizzle out." Sean Thomas expressed confusion in his opinion piece for The Spectator that, preceding Grusch, there have been others trying to convince officials and the public that UFOs are worthy of serious considerations including some who themselves were high-ranking U.S. officials. The New York Times columnist Ross Douthat noted in a June 10 opinion piece that one interpretation of the flap is that parts of the U.S. government see benefit in promoting belief in UFOs, noting similarities between Grusch's claims and the claims of Garry Nolan, Stanford pathology professor and longtime proponent of the UFO extraterrestrial hypothesis, among others. (According to Leslie Kean, Nolan knows and respects Grusch.) Matt Stieb, writing for New York, described Grusch's claims in Coulthart's interview as "crazy".

Ezra Klein, a columnist with The New York Times, posted a podcast interview with Kean on June 20, 2023, noting that "the main reactions" to Kean's recent story about Grusch "have been to either embrace it as definitive truth or dismiss it out of hand." Klein asked a series of skeptical questions. Kean agreed that it is difficult to believe that the federal government could maintain secrecy for such a program for several decades.

Steven Greenstreet, a documentary filmmaker and an investigative journalist, criticized Grusch in a video with the New York Post for previously attending UFO conventions and associating with the Skinwalker Ranch ufologists Jeremy Corbell and George Knapp, whom he met at a Star Trek Convention and both of whom sat behind Grusch at the July 26 Hearing and whom Representative Tim Burchett recognized from the dais and read their statements into the record.

Outside the United States, the story received attention from multiple foreign mainstream news outlets, in such countries as Denmark, Germany, Austria, France, the Netherlands, Sweden, Norway, Croatia, and Turkey. The 2023 House Committee hearing at which Grusch testified brought much wider coverage to his claims including major international outlets like the BBC, CNN, and others.

=== Disinformation campaign allegations ===
Grusch claimed that intentional disinformation was being promoted by the US government to cast doubt on the veracity of "non-human" UFO claims such as his. Adam Gabbatt of The Guardian described Grusch's position as "a common conspiracy trope in the UFO community". Others have suggested that, for ulterior motives, Grusch was given disinformation about aliens in order to encourage the public to believe in the extraordinary claim of aliens. Gareth Nicholson, editor for the South China Morning Post, wrote that "the current UAP flap could be an attempt by the US military to engage in a disinformation campaign to disguise real aerospace breakthroughs or an attempt to flush out advanced technologies held by rivals such as Russia and China".

== See also ==
- Disclosure movement
- Unidentified Anomalous Phenomena Disclosure Act
- Yankee Blue
