= Garry Nolan =

American academic (born 1961)

- Born: Garry Philip James Nolan; 1961 (age 64–65); United Kingdom

Academic background
- Education: Cornell University; Stanford University
- Thesis: Individual cell gene regulation studies and in situ detection of transcriptionally active chromatin using fluorescence-activated cell sorting with a viable cell fluorogenic assay (1989)
- Doctoral advisor: Leonard Herzenberg
- Other advisor: David Baltimore

Academic work
- Institutions: Stanford University

Garry Philip James Nolan (born 1961) is a British-American immunologist, academic, inventor, and business executive. He holds the Rachford and Carlota A. Harris Professor Endowed Chair in the Department of Pathology at Stanford University School of Medicine. Nolan has founded biotechnology companies. Since 2022, most of his public appearances have been related to his support for ufology and his belief that extraterrestrial intelligence has visited or resides on Earth.

== Early life and education ==
Nolan was born in the United Kingdom and his family emigrated to the US in 1963. He grew up in Windsor, Connecticut and attended Cornell University from 1979 to 1983 and obtained a BS degree in biology with a specialization in genetics. In 1989, he received his PhD in genetics from Stanford University under Leonard Herzenberg and he conducted post-doctoral work with Nobel laureate David Baltimore at Massachusetts Institute of Technology from 1990 to 1993.

== Research and career ==
Nolan joined Stanford University School of Medicine in 1993 as an assistant professor in the Department of Microbiology and Immunology. He was promoted to associate professor in 1999 and professor in 2009. Since 2011, Nolan is the Rachford and Carlota A. Harris Professor at the Department of Microbiology and Immunology. His areas of research include autoimmunity and inflammation, cancer and leukemia, hematopoiesis, and using computation for network and systems immunology.

=== Companies ===
In 1996, Nolan founded the biotechnology company Rigel, Inc. with colleagues Donald Payan, James Gower, Thomas Raffin, and Ronald Garren in South San Francisco. In 2003, he established the biotech company Nodality, Inc., which develops "personalized tests for cancer and autoimmune diseases." Big data company BINA Technology was founded in 2010 and bought out by Roche in 2014 for $107 million. In 2011, he founded Apprise, which focused on cell analysis using split-pool technology. Nolan later sold Apprise to Roche, with whom he co-founded another startup, Scale Bio, which also focuses on split-pool technology. In 2015, with postdocs Yury Goltsev and Nikolay Samusik, he founded Akoya Biosciences, which commercializes Nolan's co-Detection by indexing (CODEX) technology.

== Ufology and belief in extraterrestrial contact ==
Starting in 2012, Nolan promoted his investigations of the Atacama skeleton, a corpse from Chile that ufologists had speculated to be of alien origin, but which he later revealed to be a mummified human stillbirth with genetic bone defects and gene mutation causing deformity.

According to Nolan, he was approached by "some people representing the government and an aerospace corporation to help them understand the medical harm that had come to some individuals, related to supposed interactions with an anomalous craft" because "they were interested in the kinds of blood analysis that my lab can do".

Nolan has made extensive claims in conjunction with other ufologists about supposed materials associated with UFOs. In August 2022, Nolan appeared on Fox News' Tucker Carlson Tonight show and discussed his claims of UAP-related research in an hour-long interview. During a May 2023 SALT iConnections conference in Manhattan for an interview with Alex Klokus titled "The Pentagon, Extraterrestrial Intelligence and Crashed UFOs", Nolan claimed that some governments have retrieved artifacts from extraterrestrial craft, said that he gives the probability as "100 percent" that extraterrestrials have not only visited Earth but have been visiting earth for a long time, and speculated that what has visited Earth are simply "emissaries" and possibly drones. As New York Times columnist Ezra Klein interviewed journalist and UFO author Leslie Kean in June 2023, Kean told Klein that Nolan "knows David Grusch very well and vouches for him".

In June 2026, Nolan was named as a member of the newly created UAP Science Advisory Council at the request of the White House. Other notable appointees include former Sol Foundation speaker Timothy Gallaudet; Harvard University professor Avi Loeb; and Michael Shermer. founder of Skeptic (American magazine) and co-founder of the Skeptics Society

=== Sol Foundation ===
Nolan co-founded The Sol Foundation with sociocultural anthropologist Peter Skafish on August 15, 2023. The Sol Foundations's focus is on physical materials research of physical objects. The foundation's stated purpose is to advocate for "methodical, scientifically-robust assessment and analysis" of UAP Phenomenon. It advocates for research into UAP and into what it terms "non-human intelligence" or "NHI".

Physics professor Matthew Szydagis of the University at Albany, SUNY credited the Sol Foundation with defining the term "catastrophic disclosure" as the "accidental disclosure of conclusive evidence of the existence of NHI, outside of the control of human institutions, such as governments and militaries."

In 2023, the Sol Foundation started an annual symposium to showcase discoveries, proposals, and ideas relating to UAP. The first edition of the event was called the Sol Foundation Initiative for UAP Research and Policy conference. and was held at Stanford University in Palo Alto, California. The purpose of the 2023 conference was, according to the foundation, to address unanswered questions regarding this "deepening enigma" of UAP. Notable speakers at this event included Charles McCullough, the former Inspector General of the Intelligence Community, Christopher Mellon, a former Deputy Assistant Secretary of Defense for Intelligence, and Colonel Karl E. Nell the former Deputy Chief of Staff for U.S. Africa Command. David Grusch also made a "surprise appearance" at the event. United States Navy oceanographer and admiral Timothy Gallaudet was reported as a presenter at the Sol Foundation Symposium of 2023. PopMatters described the Sol Foundation Symposium's founding as part of a broader increase in interest in UAP following the David Grusch UFO whistleblower claims.

==== Notable people ====
- Garry Nolan, executive director
- Timothy Gallaudet, Rear Admiral (ret) US Navy, formerly Deputy Administrator of the National Oceanic and Atmospheric Administration
- Kevin Knuth, Professor of Physics at the University of Albany
- Jeffrey J. Kripal, J. Newton Rayzor Chair in Philosophy and Religious Thought at Rice University
- Avi Loeb, Frank B. Baird Jr. Professor of Science at Harvard University
- Diana Walsh Pasulka, Professor of Religious Studies at the University of North Carolina Wilmington
- Jacques Vallée, ufologist

== Awards and honors ==
- Hans Sigrist Prize (2021)
- United States Department of Defense Teal Innovator Award (2012)
