= Jolene Creighton =

American journalist

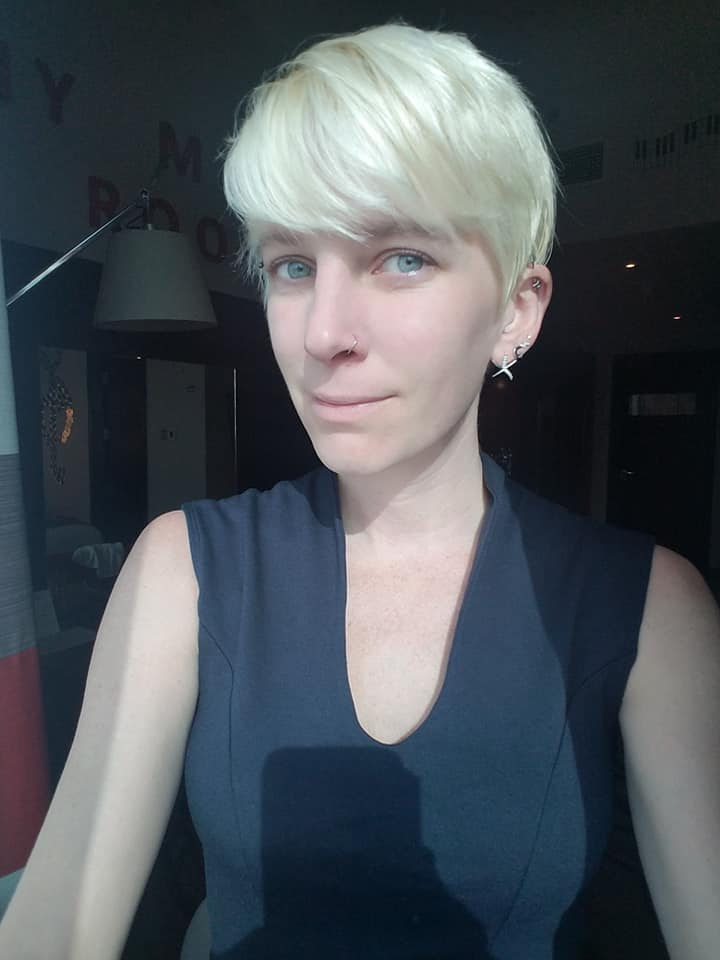
- Creighton in 2018
- Born: Jolene Elizabeth Evans; January 2, 1985 (age 41); Geneva, New York, U.S.
- Education: Keuka College (BA), SUNY Brockport (MA)
- Occupations: Media executive, entrepreneur, consultant
- Website: jolenecreighton.com

Jolene Creighton (born 1985) is an American media executive, entrepreneur, and consultant. She was the founding editor-in-chief of the science news site Futurism. In 2017, Creighton co-founded Gravity Products, a subsidiary of Futurism. The company's inaugural product, the Gravity Blanket, pioneered the weighted blanket movement. Creighton also served as editor-in-chief of the science and technology news site Interesting Engineering and executive editor at the Web3 media publication NFTnow.

== Early life and education ==
Creighton attended Waterloo High School in Waterloo, New York. She studied English at Keuka College and graduated magna cum laude in 2004. She earned a master of arts degree from SUNY Brockport in 2011, where her thesis focused on digital media, viral storytelling, and the culture industry.

In 2014, Creighton's pit bull achieved viral fame after she uploaded a video of the dog barking apprehensively at a pineapple. After the video went viral, Creighton noted that the dog was a stray and used the story to advocate for spaying, neutering, and adoption in press. Creighton said, "Ultimately, that night I found Stella, she wasn't alone. Not really. There are a million more animals out there who still need someone. In fact, there's more than a million."

== Career ==
Creighton began her career as an instructor at the University of Southern Mississippi, where she taught courses on writing and communication. In 2012, she co-founded the science news site From Quarks to Quasars, which was acquired by Futurism in 2015. Creighton left academia and fully transitioned to journalism later in 2015, when she helped launch Futurism and joined the team as the founding editor-in-chief. The publication secured an average of 20 million monthly readers and 100 million monthly video views by April 2017.

In April 2017, Creighton helped launch the Gravity Blanket with Futurism and raised more than $4.7 million in crowdfunding. The product was ultimately credited with launching the weighted blanket movement, and was eventually spun off into a Futurism subsidiary, Gravity Products.

Futurism was acquired by Singularity University in 2019 for an undisclosed sum. In December 2020, Interesting Engineering announced that Creighton would be joining as editor-in-chief. In February 2021, Gravity Products was acquired for an undisclosed sum to Win Brands Group. The following year, Creighton left Interesting Engineering and joined nft now as executive editor.

== Selected publications ==
- Creighton, Jolene (August 24, 2014). "Dark matter detected?". Hattiesburg American.
- Creighton, Jolene (February 10, 2015). "Here's what happened when a woman sent a job rejection to a man". Business Insider.
- Creighton, Jolene (August 2, 2017). "Buzz Aldrin Sees Humans on Mars within Next 20 Years". NBC.
- Creighton, Jolene (September 8, 2017). "Could 're-engineering' Earth help ease hurricane threats?". NBC News.
- Creighton, Jolene (March 18, 2018). "OpenAI Wants to Make Safe AI, but That May Be an Impossible Task". Futurism.
- Creighton, Jolene (February 5, 2019). "The Breakdown of the INF: Who's to Blame for the Collapse of the Landmark Nuclear Treaty?". Future of Life.
- Creighton, Jolene (May 30, 2020). "The Inevitable Abyss: Each Year, We Lose Yet Another Section of The Universe". ScienceAlert.
- Creighton, Jolene. "Jolene Creighton, Editor-in-Chief, Science Communication, Futurism". World Economic Forum.
