= Presidential Commission for the Study of Bioethical Issues =

The Presidential Commission for the Study of Bioethical Issues (the Bioethics Commission) was created by Executive Order 13521 on November 24, 2009. The Bioethics Commission advised President Barack Obama on bioethical issues arising from advances in biomedicine and related areas of science and technology. It replaced The President's Council on Bioethics appointed by United States President George W. Bush to advise his administration on bioethics, and the National Bioethics Advisory Commission (1996-2001). No national organization replaced it when its authorization expired; It "held its final meeting at the end of August 2016 and closed its doors."

== Reports ==
- Bioethics for Every Generation: Deliberation and Education in Health, Science, and Technology, published in May 2016, provides eight recommendations to strengthen and advance deliberation and education to improve policy-making in bioethics, and to create a more democratic and just society.
- Gray Matters: Topics at the Intersection of Neuroscience, Ethics, and Society (Gray Matters, Vol. 2), published March 2015, seeks to clarify the scientific landscape, identify common ground, and recommend ethical paths forward, broadly focusing its analysis on three topics: cognitive enhancement, consent capacity, and neuroscience and the legal system.
- Ethics and Ebola: Public Health Planning and Response, published in February 2015, provides seven recommendations offering targeted policy and research design suggestions, including the integration of ethical principles into timely and agile public health decision making processes employed in response to rapidly unfolding epidemics.
- Gray Matters: Integrative Approaches for Neuroscience, Ethics, and Society (Gray Matters, Vol. 1), published in May 2014, recommends an early and explicit integration of ethics throughout research, as well as the integration of ethics and science through education at all levels, the evaluation of existing and innovative approaches to ethics integration, and the explicit inclusion of ethical perspectives on advisory and review bodies.
- Anticipate and Communicate: Ethical Management of Incidental and Secondary Findings in the Clinical, Research, and Direct-to-Consumer Contexts, published in December 2013, recommends that all practitioners anticipate and plan for incidental and secondary findings and communicate that plan to patients, research participants, and consumers so they are informed ahead of time about what to expect.
- Safeguarding Children: Pediatric Medical Countermeasure Research, published in March 2013, concluded that the federal government would have to take multiple steps before anthrax vaccine trials with children could be ethically considered.
- Privacy and Progress in Whole Genome Sequencing, published in October 2012, concluded that to realize the enormous promise that whole genome sequencing holds for advancing clinical care as a public good, individual interests in privacy must be respected and secured.
- Moral Science: Protecting Participants in Human Subjects Research, published in December 2011, recommends 14 changes to current practices to better protect participants in research. In particular, the Commission called on the federal government to improve its tracking of research programs supported with taxpayer dollars.
- "Ethically Impossible": STD Research in Guatemala from 1946 to 1948, published in September 2011, concluded that the Guatemala syphilis experiments "involved unconscionable basic violations of ethics, even as judged against the researchers’ own recognition of the requirements of the medical ethics of the day".
- New Directions: The Ethics of Synthetic Biology and Emerging Technologies, published in December 2010, recommended increased federal oversight of synthetic biology research.

== Educational Materials ==
Commission-developed bioethics educational materials are freely available for download from the archived Bioethics Commission website . They are intended to be adapted for use in diverse learning contexts, including K-12 and higher education classrooms, professional education, and community settings.

Bioethics Commission educational materials include:

- User Guides are quick reference guides for professionals or educators to relevant educational materials.
- Primers outline a practical application, such as addressing scientific hype in neuroscience, of selected Bioethics Commission recommendations.
- Topic-based modules focus on topics common to several Bioethics Commission reports, such as community engagement or research design, to support integrating ethics in the classroom.
- Classroom discussion guides provide discussion prompts and questions for instructors at various levels.
- Case studies explore ethical issues including communication and use of liberty-restricting public health interventions in public health emergencies.
- Empirical research resources include datasets that can be used to teach about or conduct research in bioethics and related fields.
- Deliberative scenarios provide an introduction with teacher companions to the process of democratic deliberation, focusing on topics including the use of prescription stimulants for enhanced academic performance or the return of genetic research results.
- Podcast discussion guides outline discussion questions to be used in conjunction with the Bioethics Commission’s podcast series, Ethically Sound.
- Videos and webinars about Bioethics Commission work are available.

== Members ==
- Amy Gutmann, Ph.D., Chair
- James W. Wagner, Ph.D., Vice Chair
- Anita L. Allen, J.D., Ph.D.
- Lonnie Ali, M.B.A
- John D. Arras, Ph.D.
- Barbara F. Atkinson, M.D.
- Nita A. Farahany, J.D., Ph.D.
- Alexander G. Garza, M.D.
- Christine Grady, R.N., Ph.D.
- Stephen L. Hauser, M.D.
- Raju S. Kucherlapati, Ph.D.
- Nelson Lee Michael, M.D., Ph.D.
- Daniel Sulmasy, M.D., Ph.D.

== Bioethics Commission Staff ==
The Bioethics Commission was supported by a staff that provided research, communication, management, and administrative support for its activities. Lisa M. Lee, Ph.D., M.A., M.S. (2012-2017) and Valerie Bonham, J.D. (2010-2011) served as executive directors. The research staff, senior advisors, and consultants included public health scientists, educators, lawyers, philosophers, geneticists, and historians, among others.
