= Anthony Scaramucci =

American financier & political figure

- Scaramucci in 2026

White House Communications Director
- In office July 21, 2017 – July 31, 2017
- President: Donald Trump
- Preceded by: Sean Spicer (acting)
- Succeeded by: Hope Hicks

Personal details
- Born: January 6, 1964 (age 62) Port Washington, New York, U.S.
- Party: Republican
- Spouses: Lisa Miranda (m. 1988; div. 2014) Deidre Ball (m. 2014)
- Children: 5
- Education: Tufts University (BA); Harvard University (JD)
- Anthony Scaramucci's voice Scaramucci discusses monetary policy at the World Economic Forum. Recorded January 18, 2017

Anthony Scaramucci (/ˌskærəˈmuːtʃi/ SKARR-ə-MOO-chee; born January 6, 1964) is an American financier and broadcaster who briefly served as the White House communications director from July 21 to July 31, 2017.

Scaramucci worked at Goldman Sachs's investment banking, equities, and private wealth management divisions between 1989 and 1996. After leaving Goldman Sachs, he founded Oscar Capital Management, and in 2005, he founded the investment firm SkyBridge Capital.

On July 21, 2017, Scaramucci was appointed White House Communications Director. Days into the job, Scaramucci provoked controversy after launching a strongly worded attack on members of the Trump administration, including an interview with The New Yorker's Ryan Lizza that he believed was off the record. Ten days after his appointment, he was dismissed by President Donald Trump, at the recommendation of the new White House Chief of Staff, John F. Kelly. He has since been critical of Trump in the media and voiced his support for Joe Biden and Kamala Harris in the 2020 and 2024 elections, respectively.

== Early life ==
Scaramucci was born into an Italian-American family on January 6, 1964, on Long Island, New York, where he was raised in Port Washington. He is the son of Marie DeFeo Scaramucci and Alexander Scaramucci, who was a crane operator. His paternal grandfather, Alessandro Scaramucci, immigrated to the United States from Gualdo Tadino, Umbria. He had a working-class / lower middle class (according to US definitions) upbringing and was the first generation of his family to attend college. He has an older brother, David, and a sister, Susan. Scaramucci graduated in 1982 from Paul D. Schreiber Senior High School in Port Washington, where he served as student council president. He earned a B.A. in economics at Tufts University and a J.D. at Harvard Law School. Scaramucci credits his time and education at Harvard Law School as a springboard for his career in finance. He has never practiced law and went to work at Goldman Sachs directly after graduating.

== Career in investment banking ==
Scaramucci began his career at Goldman Sachs in 1989, in the Investment Banking division. A year later he was fired, then rehired two months later in the Equities division. In 1993, he became a vice president in the bank's Private Wealth Management division.

=== Oscar Capital Management ===
Scaramucci left Goldman in 1996 to launch Oscar Capital Management with his colleague Andrew Boszhardt. In 2001, Oscar Capital was sold to Neuberger Berman, and upon Neuberger Berman's sale to Lehman Brothers in 2003, Scaramucci served as a managing director in the firm's Investment Management division.

=== SkyBridge Capital ===
In 2005, Scaramucci founded SkyBridge Capital, a global alternative investment firm. Scaramucci is the chairman of the SkyBridge Alternatives Conference, or "SALT" Conference, launched in 2009. SALT hosts its annual flagship event in Las Vegas and an international event in the Fall/Winter. SALT has hosted large conferences in Singapore, Tokyo and, most recently, Abu Dhabi.

In 2011, Scaramucci received the Ernst & Young Entrepreneur of the Year Award New York Award in the Financial Services category, and in 2016 was ranked No. 85 in Worth magazine's "Power 100: The 100 Most Powerful People in Global Finance".

In May 2014, SkyBridge licensed the rights to Wall Street Week, a financial television news program formerly hosted by Louis Rukeyser on PBS, but then hosted by Scaramucci. Broadcast rights were transferred to Fox Broadcasting Company in 2016.

On January 17, 2017, SkyBridge announced the sale of a majority stake of its business to RON Transatlantic EG and HNA Capital (U.S.) Holding, a Chinese conglomerate with close ties to the Chinese Communist Party (CCP). With the announcement, Scaramucci stepped down from his co-management role and ended his affiliation with SkyBridge and SALT. In April 2018, it was announced that Scaramucci would be returning to SkyBridge after the deal with HNA Group had collapsed due to the lack of approval of the Committee on Foreign Investment in the United States, an inter-agency government committee.

As of March 2023, Skybridge's assets had dwindled to about $2 billion from a peak of $9 billion in 2015. Investors lost about 30% from the beginning of 2020 through March 2023. The fund had reduced the ability of investors to withdraw funds and reduced staffing.

== Political activities ==
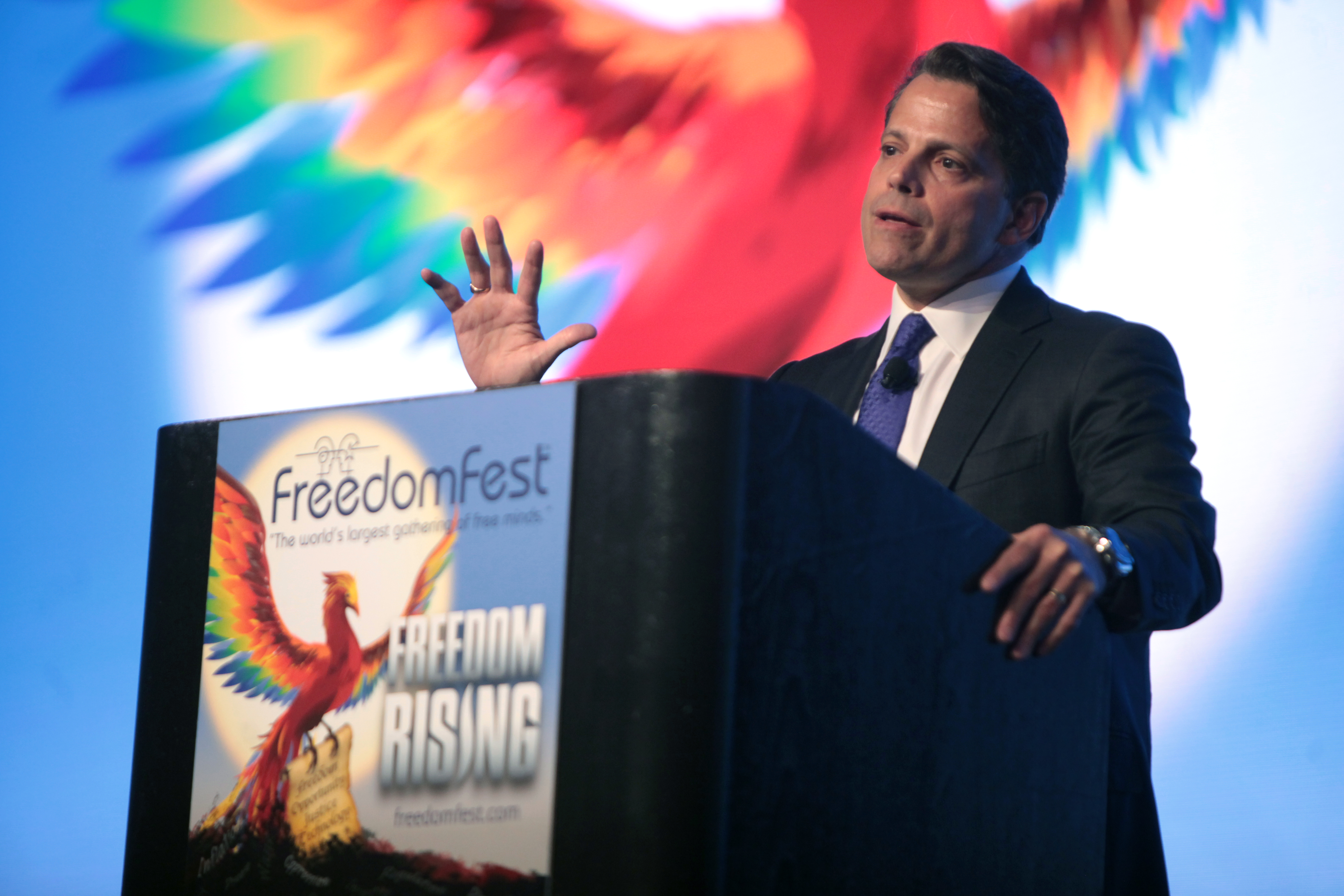
Scaramucci at 2016 FreedomFest

=== Before 2016 ===
Scaramucci supported the presidential campaigns of Hillary Clinton and Barack Obama. In 2008, Scaramucci was a fundraiser for Obama's presidential campaign. In September 2010, however, Scaramucci asked Obama at a CNBC event when he was going to "stop whacking Wall Street like a piñata".

Scaramucci had tweeted at various times during 2012, that he was against the death penalty and "always been for strong gun control laws" and that "Republicans should support gay marriage".

He served as the national finance co-chair for Mitt Romney's 2012 presidential campaign.

In 2015, on a Fox Business Network television appearance, Scaramucci called Trump a "hack politician" whose rhetoric is "anti-American and very, very divisive". He further warned Trump to "cut it out now", and "stop all this crazy rhetoric". In December 2015, Scaramucci criticized Trump's call for a border wall between Mexico and the US. He also criticized Trump for "making a fundamental mistake of trying to blame all of Islam and all Muslims for what is the ideology and the actions of a minority".

Ahead of the 2016 election, Scaramucci tweeted that he hoped Hillary Clinton would be the next president, but had turned against Clinton by 2015. During the 2016 Republican Party presidential primaries, Scaramucci first endorsed Scott Walker and later Jeb Bush. In May 2016, after Walker and Bush had withdrawn from the race, Scaramucci signed on to Donald Trump's political campaign by joining the Trump Finance Committee. In November 2016, he was appointed to the Presidential Transition Team Executive Committee of then-president-elect Trump.

=== Announcement of Office of Public Liaison leadership ===
On January 12, 2017, Scaramucci was named Assistant to the President and director of the White House Office of Public Liaison and Intergovernmental Affairs. On January 23, he told New York magazine: "the thing I have learned about these people in Washington is they have no money. So what happens when they have no fucking money is they write about what seat they are in and what the title is. Fucking congressmen act like that. They are fucking jackasses." On the topic of working in Washington DC, he said: "[…] that's Washington. That's how they operate. They try to caricaturise you, and dehumanise you, so that you lose your voice. They wanted to get me by grinding out a public image of me that is dramatically different from the reality."

Scaramucci attended the World Economic Forum in Davos on January 16–17, 2017 as the representative for the Trump transition team. Part of his mission was to reassure attendees about the incoming Trump administration. Following General Secretary of the Chinese Communist Party Xi Jinping, he gave a talk warning against protectionism and championing free trade.

Fox Business reported on January 31, 2017, that "Scaramucci's delayed appointment underscores some of the tensions building inside the Trump White House, as various aides and advisers continue to jockey for his attention and to retain and expand their power." According to Politico, on January 31, 2017, with Scaramucci's appointment still pending approval by the United States Office of Government Ethics (OGE), Trump's chief of staff Reince Priebus called Scaramucci to tell him he should pull out of consideration. They reported that Priebus opposed Scaramucci's appointment because of Scaramucci's stake in SkyBridge Capital. Several senior White House officials questioned the significance of any internal feuding in Scaramucci's appointment delay, but officials have cited the lengthy process of Scaramucci concluding his sale of SkyBridge as the reason for the delay in his appointment. Reuters reported on February 1 that Scaramucci would not get the director role. In a February 2017 New York magazine article, Priebus was quoted as saying rumors that he interfered with the hiring were "not true".

On March 6, 2017, the White House announced the appointment of Ideagen founder and former CEO George Sifakis as director for the Office of Public Liaison, instead of Scaramucci. The next day, Politico reported that Priebus was still considering offering Scaramucci a role in the administration.

On June 26, 2017, three network investigative journalists—Thomas Frank, Eric Lichtblau, and Lex Haris—resigned from CNN after the network retracted a story that connected Scaramucci to a $10 billion Russian investment fund. CNN issued an apology to Scaramucci (who accepted the apology), with the network saying the online story (which appeared on CNN's website and was not aired on television) did not meet its editorial standards. Scaramucci said the original story was not true; CNN did not say the story was false, but said that it "wasn't solid enough" to be published.

=== Export–Import Bank of the United States ===
Effective June 19, 2017, Scaramucci was named senior vice president and chief strategy officer for the U.S. Export–Import Bank. He was also still under consideration for a post as ambassador to the Organisation for Economic Co-operation and Development.

=== White House Communications Director ===
On July 21, 2017, President Trump appointed Scaramucci White House Communications Director. The White House announcement said he would report directly to the President rather than to the White House Chief of Staff, as White House Press Secretary Sean Spicer had. On the day that Scaramucci's appointment was announced, Spicer resigned. The New York Times reported that he had done so after advising Trump that he "vehemently disagreed" with the appointment of Scaramucci. White House Chief of Staff Reince Priebus also had "vehement objections" to his hiring. On July 26, 2017, journalist Ryan Lizza reported that Scaramucci called him to try to identify who leaked information about a meeting to The New Yorker. During the call, Scaramucci revealed some disagreements with Priebus and White House advisor Steve Bannon. Scaramucci believed the conversation to be off the record.

During the interview and in a tweet immediately afterward, Scaramucci said that he had contacted or would be contacting the FBI and the Department of Justice, asking them to investigate Priebus for allegedly "leaking" his financial disclosure form to Politico reporter Lorraine Woellert. Scaramucci later deleted the tweet. Woellert stated publicly that she obtained the information from the U.S. Export-Import Bank.

On July 28, Priebus's resignation as chief of staff was announced; Priebus said that he had resigned the previous day. Also on July 28, Trump announced that he had named retired general John F. Kelly as his new chief of staff.

On July 31, Trump dismissed Scaramucci from his role as communications director on the recommendation of Kelly, who wanted him removed because he did not think Scaramucci was disciplined and believed Scaramucci had lost credibility. As one of his first acts after being sworn in as chief of staff, Kelly reportedly invited Scaramucci to his office and told him he was being let go. An official White House statement indicated that Scaramucci "will be leaving" his post "to give Chief of Staff John Kelly a clean slate and the ability to build his own team."

Scaramucci's version of the sequence of events, as of 2025, is that Jared Kushner pre-warned him that he was probably being let go for embarrassing Trump during a Cabinet meeting. According to Scaramucci, he told Trump that trying to veto the Countering America's Adversaries Through Sanctions Act would fail as the Republicans in Congress would be able to gather enough votes to override Trump's veto. Kushner advised Scaramucci that, "you can't tell him something he doesn't know, in front of other people!" On the morning of his departure, Scaramucci's secure White House phone was blocked around 6 a.m. and less than four hours later, the official statement of his White House departure was released, terminating his role.

At the time of his termination, Scaramucci's tenure of eleven days was tied for the shortest in history, leading some commentators to compare similarly short political position tenures in units of Scaramuccis.

=== Post–White House activities ===
In July 2019, Scaramucci predicted that Trump would win "40+ states in 2020" but turned against Trump shortly thereafter, strongly criticizing Trump's attacks against women of color as "racist and unacceptable." In August 2019, Scaramucci said that he no longer supported Trump's reelection campaign.

Scaramucci cited Trump's conduct during his visits in the aftermath of mass shootings in El Paso and Dayton; during Trump's visit to a grieving El Paso, Trump attacked his Democratic opponents, boasted about his rally crowd sizes, and was photographed making the "thumbs-up" gesture next to a baby orphaned in the shooting. Scaramucci said that Trump's visit was a "catastrophe" and that Trump was "actually dissembling a little bit, and he's sounding more and more nonsensical." Scaramucci said he remained a registered Republican, but could not support Trump "because he's lost his mind." Trump responded with a series of tweets attacking Scaramucci.

In June 2020, Scaramucci joined Matt Borges and other well-known Republican operatives to launch Right Side PAC, a super PAC aiming to prevent Trump's re-election as president and support his Democratic opponent, Joe Biden. Scaramucci served as an adviser to the group. He was one of multiple other Trump former officials to endorse Biden.

Scaramucci reiterated his support for Biden (and later Kamala Harris) in 2024.

== Other activities ==
=== Books ===
He is the author of eight books:

- Scaramucci, Anthony (2010). Goodbye Gordon Gekko: How to Find Your Fortune Without Losing Your Soul. Wiley. ISBN 978-0470619544.
- Scaramucci, Anthony (2012). The Little Book of Hedge Funds: What You Need to Know About Hedge Funds but the Managers Won't Tell You. ISBN 978-1118099674.
- Scaramucci, Anthony (2016). Hopping Over the Rabbit Hole: How Entrepreneurs Turn Failure Into Success. Wiley. ISBN 978-1119116332.
- Scaramucci, Anthony (2018). Trump, the Blue-Collar President. Center Street. ISBN 978-1119116332.
- The Sweet Life with Bitcoin: How I Stopped Worrying about Cryptocurrency and You Should Too!. SALT Books. August 25, 2021. ISBN 978-1-63758-335-7.
- Scaramucci, Anthony (2024). From Wall Street to the White House and back: the Scaramucci guide to unbreakable resilience. Salt Books. ISBN 978-1-63758-463-7.
- Huang, Ken; et al. (2024). Web3: blockchain, the new economy, and the self-sovereign internet. Cambridge University Press. ISBN 978-1-009-37567-2.
- Scaramucci, Anthony; Saylor, Michael (2025). The little book of Bitcoin: what you need to know that Wall Street has already figured out. John Wiley & Sons. ISBN 978-1-394-28664-5.
- Scaramucci, Anthony (2026). All the Wrong Moves: How Three Catastrophic Decisions Led to the Rise of Trump. Henry Holt and Co. ISBN 9781250437563.

=== Appearances in media ===
Scaramucci paid $100,000 to have SkyBridge's logo in the film Wall Street: Money Never Sleeps (2010), along with two cameo appearances.

He joined Fox Business Network as a contributor in 2014, and in March 2016 served as host of the financial television show Wall Street Week.

He and his wife were interviewed in an episode of Dr. Phil (March 6, 2018) titled "Anthony Scaramucci & His Wife Deidre Reveal How Their Marriage Survived 11 Days in the White House".

On January 13, 2019, it was announced Scaramucci would be a participant in the second American season of the reality show competition Celebrity Big Brother; though, in a twist, it was revealed he was a Fake HouseGuest on the show.

On January 30, 2023, Scaramucci appeared in episode 39 of the podcast Mislaibeled. During the hour-long conversation, Scaramucci criticized Trump and his cabinet, and blamed Wikipedia for some misinformation about himself.

Scaramucci has hosted the US edition of The Rest Is Politics with Katty Kay since April 26, 2024. Originally the podcast was scheduled to continue until the 2024 United States presidential election. Following the election, Scaramucci continued hosting the show, following a successful reception for the show during the lead-up to the election.

In 2026, Scaramucci took part in a British TV show called The Wargame, playing the US Secretary of State. The series saw political figures naviagate a fictional scenario in which Russia had attacked the UK.

=== Business ventures ===
Scaramucci, along with restaurateur Eytan Sugarman and financier Nelson Braff, founded the Hunt & Fish Club steakhouse and seafood restaurant in Midtown Manhattan in New York City, which opened in 2015.

On October 2, 2017, Scaramucci launched an online media venture called the Scaramucci Post. At a press conference, Scaramucci said that "we have no idea what the Scaramucci Post is and neither do you. But, we launched it today and we launched with great fanfare and so we'll have to see how the whole thing unfolds." Later that month, the Post was criticized for posting a Twitter poll asking "How many Jews were killed in the Holocaust?". The tweet was posted by Scaramucci's business partner Lance Laifer without the approval of Scaramucci, who was in London at the time; when he found out about the tweet, Scaramucci was reportedly furious at Laifer. The tweet was soon taken down, and Scaramucci subsequently wrote that "If anyone was offended by this act, you have both my sincere personal apology and commitment that it will never happen again", and pledged to donate $25,000 to the Simon Wiesenthal Center. Subsequently, however, the Post tweeted that they had changed their mind on the poll, defending their decision to post it and accusing their critics of "laziness and mob-mentality", claiming that the poll was designed to illustrate that memory was fading about the death of 6 million Jews.

As of 2025, Scaramucci is affiliated with the Worshipful Company of International Bankers in the City of London.

=== Tufts University ===
In June 2016, Scaramucci joined the Board of Advisors of the Fletcher School of Law and Diplomacy at Tufts University, his alma mater. In early November 2017, 240 Tufts students, faculty, and alumni signed an online petition calling for Scaramucci's removal from the position. One Fletcher graduate student, Camilo Caballero, wrote a pair of op-eds in Tufts' independent student newspaper, The Tufts Daily, on November 6 and 13. On November 21, 2017, lawyers representing Scaramucci sent a cease-and-desist letter to the Daily, alleging that the op-eds contained factual inaccuracies which attempted to defame him. The letter demanded that Caballero and the Daily issue a retraction and an apology for its allegedly defamatory statements, threatening a lawsuit if the paper did not comply within five business days.

The Daily opted to keep the full text of the editorials on its website while publishing publicly the cease-and-desist letter on November 27, 2017. That evening, members of the Tufts Community Union (TCU) Senate, the main student government body at Tufts University, publicly called on the university to remove Scaramucci from the Fletcher School's Board of Advisors. On November 28, 2017, Scaramucci resigned his position.

=== Board memberships ===
He is a trustee of the United States Olympic & Paralympic Foundation. He is also a member of the Council on Foreign Relations. Scaramucci was a member of the New York City Financial Services Advisory Committee from 2007 to 2012.

=== Honorary citizenship ===
In February 2021 it was announced that he would become an honorary citizen of the ancient Italian town of Gualdo Tadino, from which his paternal family originated. The mayor and the municipal council bestowed Scaramucci with the status on March 15, 2021, with a unanimous vote citing his remarkable professional and political achievements, his deep attachment to his Italian roots and the important role his family played in the history and development of the town.

== Personal life ==
Scaramucci's first marriage was to Lisa Miranda. They separated in 2011 after 23 years of marriage, and their divorce was finalized in 2014.

His second marriage was to Deidre Ball. Ball worked in investor relations for SkyBridge Capital until Scaramucci left the firm. The couple first dated in 2011 and married on July 11, 2014, after having their first child together in early 2014. Ball filed for divorce from Scaramucci in early July 2017 when she was pregnant with their second child, to whom she gave birth on July 24, 2017, but the couple worked out their marital problems and, in September 2018, began a Radio.com podcast titled "Mooch and the Mrs.", in which they discussed their world view from opposite political stances, while managing their relationship.

== Television ==
Year	Title	Role	Air date	Status	Notes
2023	Special Forces: World's Toughest Test	Himself (contestant)	January 4, 2023	Season 1, Episode 1 – "Test of Character and Weakness"	Quit episode 6
2024	Killer Whales	Himself (judge)	March 12, 2024	5 episodes	
2026	The Wargame	Himself (acting as United States Secretary of State)	September 9, 2026	4 episodes	

== See also ==
- List of former Trump administration officials who endorsed Kamala Harris
- List of Republicans who opposed the Donald Trump 2024 presidential campaign

Political offices
Preceded by Sean Spicer; Acting	White House Director of Communications; 2017	Succeeded by Hope Hicks
