= Gravity Blanket =

Weighted blanket product

The Gravity Blanket is a weighted blanket product originally developed by—and subsequently spun off from—the technology media company Futurism. The blanket was crowdfunded via a viral Kickstarter campaign that exceeded its fundraising goal by nearly US$4.7 million. The blanket was considered by Time magazine to be among the top 50 inventions of 2018, with the magazine noting that while Gravity did not create the idea of a weighted blanket, it "perfected the art of marketing them to the masses."

== Corporate history ==
Futurism's products arm developed the idea of their Gravity Blanket a month after the 2016 United States presidential election and the general rise in anxiety disorders observed in the general population. In 2019, following the sale of Futurism to Singularity University, Gravity was spun out into its own company, Gravity Brand Holdings LLC, led by Mike Grillo and Alex Klokus, Futurism's founder. The company was subsequently acquired in 2021 by Win Brands Group, with Grillo citing a limited ability to grow without a retail store footprint. According to The Wall Street Journal, at the time of the sale, the company itself was profitable and generated $22 million in revenue in 2020, with 20 percent increases year-over-year. The Gravity Blanket accounted for "roughly" 70 percent of its revenue, with other sleep products also being successful.

== Kickstarter campaign and viral growth ==
The Kickstarter crowdfunding campaign for the Gravity Blanket was launched in April 2017 with a listed goal of US$21,500. During the campaign's first day, it raised US$150,000—US$128,500 more than its stated goal. After the company purchased advertising, more than US$2 million was raised within two weeks. When the campaign closed, it had raised more than US$4.7 million.

Early in the blanket's campaign, the news website STAT uncovered that the campaign made, according to the New Yorker, "big claims on shaky research", claiming that the blankets could treat psychological ailments. When this came to the attention of Kickstarter, Gravity removed the word "treat" before ultimately deleting the section entirely.

By May 2018, the company had grossed approximately US$15 million in sales and shipped 65,000 units after a feature on Good Morning America. Gravity partnered with Pizza Hut to create a limited-edition circular, pizza-themed weighted blanket in 2020. It was sold at a price of US$150, a 25 percent discount from their regular product line. It was dubbed as "Pizza Hut's most expensive pizza" by The Today Show.

== Public reception ==
The Gravity Blanket received generally favorable reviews from both critics and consumers, with USA Today noting that it received a 4.5 out of 5-star rating with more than 1,500 reviews and WIRED that Gravity "is one of the best-known names" in the weighted blankets' category. When featured on the Today show, the blanket was found appealing "like an adult swaddle."

In her 2018 review for the New Yorker, staff writer Jia Tolentino was impressed with the Gravity Blanket, noting that while she normally had fitful sleeps, the gravity blanket "felt wonderful" and noted how "that night I slept so deeply that I woke up unnerved." Tolentino added the blanket to her nightly routine and found that it "enacts a fantasy of immobilization that is especially seductive in a world of ever-expanding obligations".

In a review for The Guardian, Rhik Samadder called the blanket "deeply comforting" and, despite the blanket being "hot", he was "highly impressed". Entrepreneur magazine considered the product to be among "10 genius marketing campaigns that went viral" in 2018 while Time magazine credited it as one of the top 50 inventions of 2018 that, while not a new product field developed by Gravity, the company "perfected the art of marketing them to the masses."

Writing for USA Today, Lindsey Vickers shared observations similar to those of Tolentino and Samadder. Vickers reported experiencing "even more restful sleep than usual," although she acknowledged the potential for overheating. She stopped short of claiming it alleviated her stress and anxiety but noted an improvement in her ability to fall asleep quickly and appreciated the blanket's comforting pressure. Vickers commended the blanket's construction, remarking on its thoughtful design evident in its use. Echoing Samadder, she also mentioned the blanket's tendency to overheat the bed, expressing reluctance to use it during even slightly warm nights due to concerns of waking up uncomfortable and less than rejuvenated.

Vickers observed that some reviewers considered the blanket's weight options limited, with the potential to be too heavy for individuals of lighter weight, and noted "feeling too heavy" as a frequent criticism. Vickers highlighted that the blanket garnered over 1,500 consumer reviews, with a portion crediting it for helping to manage or alleviate their anxiety symptoms. Vickers ultimately determined that despite the high price, the blanket is unlikely to disappoint those who tolerate the warmth and seek a high-quality weighted blanket.
