= Ralph Blumenthal =

American journalist

Ralph Blumenthal is an American journalist and author. He was a staff reporter for The New York Times from 1964 to 2009.

== Reporting ==
On 16 December 2017, the New York Times featured an article written by Leslie Kean, Helene Cooper, and Blumenthal, which revealed the fact that the U.S. Department of Defense had spent $22.5M on a secret program titled the Advanced Aerospace Threat Identification Program that investigated UFOs.

On 5 June 2023, Blumenthal and Leslie Kean reported that former Air Force officer David Charles Grusch claimed that the United States has a secret UFO retrieval program with multiple vehicles of non-human origin as well as records of dead pilots in its possession.

== Books ==
- Blumenthal, Ralph (2021). The Believer: Alien Encounters, Hard Science, and the Passion of John Mack. Albuquerque: High Road Books. ISBN 9780826362315.
- Blumenthal, Deborah; Blumenthal, Ralph (2023). UFOhs! Mysteries in the Sky. Illustrated by Adam Gustavson. University of New Mexico Press. ISBN 9780826364951.
- Miracle at Sing Sing: How One Man Transformed the Lives of America's Most Dangerous Prisoners. St. Martin’s Press. 2004. ISBN 978-0-312-30891-9.
- Blumenthal, Ralph (2003). The Stork Club: America's most famous nightspot and the lost world of café society. Boston: Little, Brown & Co. ISBN 978-0-3161-0531-6 – via archive.org.
