= SkyBridge Alternatives Conference =

Annual hedge fund conference

SALT
- Genre: Conference
- Dates: May
- Frequency: Annual
- Locations: New York City, New York, U.S.
- Inaugurated: 2009
- Founders: Anthony Scaramucci
- Sponsor: SkyBridge Capital
- Website: salt.org

The SkyBridge Alternatives Conference (often stylized SALT or SALT iConnections) is an annual hedge fund conference sponsored by SkyBridge Capital that started in 2009. The world's largest hedge fund conference, it is considered by The New York Times to be "one of Wall Street's most prominent gatherings" and by Reuters to be a flagship conference for Wall Street. Traditionally held in Las Vegas, Nevada, the conference moved to New York City in 2021. The conference is known for hosting talks by "high-profile market experts, politicians and show business personalities".

== History ==
Founded in 2009 by Anthony Scaramucci, SALT has evolved into a three-day conference that initially caused his rise to fame. The inaugural conference took place in May 2009 in the ballroom of the Encore Las Vegas.

The 2012 conference featured a performance by Maroon 5 and speeches by Al Gore and Sarah Palin. That same year saw the launch of SALT Singapore, which was later rebranded SALT Asia. By 2014, SALT Asia was reported to attract approximately half as many attendees as its larger Las Vegas counterpart.

In 2017, the attempted sale of SkyBridge Capital to HNA Group resulted in the SALT conference being spun off into its own entity and Scaramucci's divestiture to join President Donald Trump's first administration. Eleven days after his hiring, he was fired by Trump and returned to SALT. The proposed sale, which caused a hiatus in 2018, did not complete, with HNA Group withdrawing its bid.

Starting with the 2019 conference, the conference's focus shifted from being predominantly hedge fund focused to attracting wider audiences. It features world leaders, after-hours parties, and a concert. The 2019 conference included a performance by John Fogerty. Speaking with Reuters in 2019, which noted how the conference was more subdued than in previous years without a party atmosphere, Scaramucci stated "What we are trying to do is very sober". The conference experienced its second-highest attendance that year, with attendees interviewed by Reuters appreciating "the faster-paced program" and "subdued tone", which they felt "was more appropriate for the current times"

The 2023 conference featured an interview with Dr. Garry Nolan about Unidentified flying objects which was hosted by SALT managing partner Alex Klokus. Klokus hosted another object discussion with retired Lieutenant colonel Karl Nell, a former member of the Unidentified Aerial Phenomena Task Force, at the 2024 conference.

== Attendance ==
The largest hedge fund conference in the world, SALT was referred to by journalist Lawrence Delevingne in 2014 as "the Super Bowl of hedge funds". As of 2018, SALT has averaged 1,800 attendees and hosted former US Presidents Bill Clinton and George Bush.
