= SkyBridge Capital =

American investment firm

- Type: Private
- Industry: Investment Management
- Founded: 2005
- Headquarters: 527 Madison Avenue; New York City, United States
- Key people: Anthony Scaramucci; Raymond Nolte; Brett S. Messing
- Website: www.skybridge.com

SkyBridge Capital is a global investment firm based in New York City, United States. It is run by founder Anthony Scaramucci, Brett S. Messing, and Raymond Nolte.

SkyBridge organises the SkyBridge Alternatives Conference, or "SALT" Conference, a capital introduction convention. In addition to its annual flagship event in Las Vegas, SALT has hosted conferences in Singapore, Tokyo and Abu Dhabi.

It has offices located in New York and Florida.

As of March 2023 Skybridge's assets had dwindled to about $2 billion from a peak of $9 billion in 2015. Investors lost about 30% of their value from the beginning of 2020 through March 2023, 39% in calendar 2022. The fund had reduced the ability of investors to withdraw funds and reduced staffing.

== History ==
SkyBridge Capital was founded in 2005 by Anthony Scaramucci, the co-founder of Oscar Capital Management.

In June 2010, SkyBridge acquired Citigroup Alternative Investments Hedge Fund Management Group. Ray Nolte, who oversaw the Citigroup operation, joined SkyBridge as co-managing partner and chief investment officer. Troy Gaveski, who served SkyBridge as co-chief investment officer from 2019-2021, also joined with the acquisition. The acquisition raised assets under management from $450 million to $5.9 billion.

In March 2015, the company opened its third office in Palm Beach Gardens, Florida. The company was also the title sponsor of West Palm Beach's inaugural bike share program, SkyBike, before the program shut down in December 2019.

On January 17, 2017, SkyBridge announced that it had signed a definitive purchase agreement with RON Transatlantic and HNA Capital U.S., with founder Scaramucci stepping down from his role as co-managing partner in order to take a role in Trump administration.

However, on April 30, 2018, HNA and SkyBridge issued a joint statement the two sides had agreed not to pursue the deal, with Scaramucci returning as co-managing partner of the company. The Committee on Foreign Investment in the United States had yet to approve HNA's takeover. The statement said that the committee had offered the two sides "a path to approval" if they made certain changes, but that neither side believed it was in its best interest to continue.

In September 2022, the venture arm of FTX bought a 30 percent stake in SkyBridge for $45 million, valuing SkyBridge at roughly $150M. SkyBridge will use $40 million from the proceeds to buy cryptocurrencies to strengthen its long-term balance sheet. The deal additionally provided FTX with a three-year option to acquire 85 percent of the fund group. In November 2022, following the insolvency crisis at FTX, Scaramucci said that he was trying to buy back the stake. Additionally, he added that SkyBridge took a loss on its exposure to FTX's FTT token.
