= Rhik Samadder =

Journalist, writer, broadcaster and actor

Rhik Samadder is a British journalist, writer, broadcaster and actor.

== Childhood and education ==
He was born in Lewisham on 24 December 1980, the son of parents who immigrated from India the previous year.

He did a degree in philosophy at University College London, and studied acting at the Drama Centre London.

== Career ==
As an actor, he had roles on HBO, BBC, ITV and Channel 4. On stage, he had title roles in The Indian Boy (Royal Shakespeare Company 2006) and Romeo and Juliet (Salisbury Playhouse). Other theatre roles include King Saturn (Soho Theatre), Fewer Emergencies (Oxford Playhouse), No Smoke (Arcola Theatre) and Ealing Common (Theatre 503). His film credits include Chemical Wedding (2008).

He began to be disillusioned with acting because, as an actor of Asian descent, the majority of parts he was approached for were terrorist dramas. After his father died in 2006, he had a breakdown and moved in with his mother, causing him to reassess his career and abandon acting.

He now has a regular column in The Guardian, where he created successful features such as "Inspect a gadget" and "Rhik Samadder tries something new". He has also written for The Observer as well as for GQ, Men's Health and Prospect magazines.

He is the author of the acclaimed autobiographical memoir I never said I loved you (2019) which tackles difficult themes such as race, sexual abuse, eating disorders, and mental health and is a Sunday Times bestseller.
