= Nita A. Farahany =

American academic (born 1978)

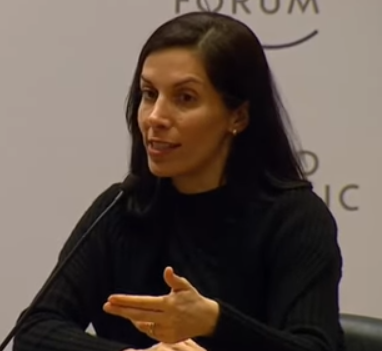
- Nita A Farahany presenting to the World Economic Forum
- Born: April 28, 1978 (age 48)
- Education: Dartmouth College (BA); Duke University (JD, MA, PhD); Harvard University (ALM)
- Spouse(s): Theodore Charles Loder, IV (m. 2012)
- Scientific career
- Fields: neuroethicist; bioethicist; law; philosophy

Nita Farahany (born April 28, 1978) is an Iranian American author and distinguished professor and scholar on the ramifications of new technology on society, law, and ethics. She currently teaches law and philosophy at Duke University where she is the Robinson O. Everett Distinguished Professor of Law & Philosophy at Duke Law School, the founding director of the Duke Initiative for Science and Society as well as chair of the Applied Ethics & Policy MA program. She is active on many committees, councils, and other groups within the law, emerging technology, and bioethics communities with a focus on technologies that have increasing potential to have ethical and legal issues. In 2010 she was appointed by President Obama to the Presidential Commission for the Study of Bioethical Issues.

== Education and background ==
Farahany completed her undergraduate studies at Dartmouth College where she earned a Bachelor of Arts in genetics, cell and developmental biology. Farahany continued with her education at Duke University in Durham, North Carolina, where she acquired a JD, MA, and PhD in philosophy of biology and jurisprudence. Additionally, she attended Harvard to study biology and receive her Master of Arts in Liberal Studies (ALM) in the field. She has since moved on to teach as well as provide legal and ethical counsel to many.

Farahany also clerked for Judge Judith W. Rogers of the US Court of Appeals for the D.C. Circuit.

== Work as an educator ==
=== Vanderbilt ===
Farahany began her work at Vanderbilt University to complete her dissertation. However, in 2006, she continued working at Vanderbilt as an assistant professor of law. She left in 2011 to become the Leah Kaplan Visiting Professor of Human Rights at Stanford Law.

=== Duke Law School ===
Farahany is a tenured Professor at Duke Law School, where she holds a Distinguished Chair as the Robinson O. Everett Professor of Law and Philosophy.

=== The Duke Initiative for Science and Society ===
Farahany is currently the Robinson O. Everett Distinguished Professor of Law and Philosophy at Duke University. Additionally, she is the founding director of the Duke initiative for Science and Society and the chair of the Applied Ethics & Policy MA.

==== Applied Ethics & Policy Master's Program ====
The Applied Ethics & Policy program is designed to merge bioethic and tech ethic training with policy and law training to add a new depth to education in these areas. It is the first of its kind. Questions concerning technological advancements affecting ethics surrounding biological science and neuroscience, and emerging technology such as artificial intelligence, machine learning, data sciences, social media, and the Internet are discussed heavily in this program, as well as preparing graduate students to be able to communicate science more efficiently with society.

==== SLAPLAB ====
SLAPLAB is the Duke Initiative for Science and Society Laboratory designed to bring scholars in undergraduate studies all the way up to postdocs and faculty together. Directed by Farahany, the group discuss new studies in ethics at the intersection of science, society, law, and philosophy. Additionally, the lab designs and undertakes new studies, present about current ongoing studies and new research, communicate with the public, and host expert speakers.

== Presidential Appointments ==
In 2010, Nita A. Farahany was appointed by President Obama to serve on the Presidential Commission for the Study of Bioethical Issues. This commission was created on November 24, 2009 by President Obama to advise him on ethical, legal, social, and philosophical issues in biosciences.

== Other notable work ==
=== Professional societies and councils ===
- International Neuroethics Society, or INS - Farahany has been a board member of the INS since 2012. She is the current president of the INS.
- Neuroethics Division of the Multi-Council Working group for BRAIN initiative
- President's Research Council of Canadian Institute for Advanced Research, or CIFAR
- Expert Network for World Economic Forum
- Presidential Commission for the Study of Bioethical Issues
- Elected Member of the American Law Institute
- Elected Fellow of AAAS for "distinguished contributions to the field of neuroethics, enabling responsible and equitable development and implementation of new knowledge and technologies in neuroscience."
- Serves on several corporations' Scientific and Ethics Advisory Boards

=== Presentations of work ===
- Conferences for the US Court of Appeals
- Conference for the National Judicial College
- The American Association for the Advancement of Science
- National Academies of Science Workshops
- The American Society for Political and Legal Philosophy
- Aspen Ideas Festival
- The World Economic Forum
- TED
- Testifying before US Congress- during the hearing on “What Facial Recognition Technology Means for Privacy and Civil Liberties”. Presented to the Senate Committee on the Judiciary Subcommittee on Privacy, Technology and the Law

=== TED talk ===
In November, 2018, Farahany gave a TED talk on the potential impact neurotechnology (decoding human thoughts) could have on societies around the world. She delved into the potential ethical obligations we, as a global society, must agree upon and how we might be able to codify and enforce said ethical decisions. Farahany poses the question: what value should be placed on the thoughts in our head and what rights should humans have to be able to decide when, if ever, those thoughts are shared. The implications behind technology that can read thoughts are already being realized in China where some workers are required to wear EEG machines under their hats in order to collect information on that worker's productivity, focus, and mood. Farahany stated her concern that society is not adapting as quickly as technology, opining "I think this is because people don't yet understand or believe the implications of this new brain-decoding technology. " To protect ourselves from advancing neurotechnology, Farahany suggests a right to cognitive liberty be recognized as a part of the Universal Declaration of Human Rights.

== Honors and awards ==
In 2021, she was awarded the Distinguished Teaching Award. Her students noted her "extraordinary vulnerability and her deep commitment to making all of her students feel like human beings," and the fact that “She opens every class asking about our lives, celebrating achievements, engagements, and cute pets. She shares details of her life with us to bring a smile to our faces and help us not feel so alone.” Farahany called the award the "most humbling honor of [her] professional career."

In 2020, Farahany earned the lifetime distinction of becoming a Fellow of the American Association for the Advancement of Science for "distinguished contributions to the field of neuroethics, enabling responsible and equitable development and implementation of new knowledge and technologies in neuroscience."

In 2013, she was elected as a member of the American Law Institute. That same year, she awarded the Paul M. Bator Award, which recognizes a young academic – under the age of forty – who has demonstrated excellence in legal scholarship, a commitment to teaching, a concern for students, and who has made a significant public impact.
