= Scavenger resin =

Example of a benzaldehyde scavenger resin

Scavenger resins are polymers (resins) with bound functional groups that react with specific by-products, impurities, or excess reagents produced in a reaction. Polymer-bound functional groups permit the use of many different scavengers, as the functional groups are confined within a resin or are simply bound to the solid support of a bead. Simply, the functional groups of one scavenger will react minimally with the functional groups of another.

== Applications ==
Employment of scavenger resins has become increasingly popular in solution-phase combinatorial chemistry. Used primarily in the synthesis of medicinal drugs, solution-phase combinatorial chemistry allows for the creation of large libraries of structurally related compounds. When purifying a solution, many approaches can be taken. In general chemical synthesis laboratories, a number of traditional techniques for purification are used as opposed to the employment of scavenger resins. Whether or not scavenger resins are used often depends on the quantity of product desired, how much time you have to produce the wanted product, and the use of the product. Some of the advantages and disadvantages to using scavenger resins as a means for purification are described later. Traditional methods of purification of these compounds becomes time consuming and does not always produce entirely pure products. The ability to specialize a scavenger resin allows for significantly reduce purification times and more pure products. Furthermore, the use of scavenger resins creates a situation where the product can remain in solution and the reaction can be monitored. Conversely, many scavenger resins must be used in large amounts to purify a given product, presenting physical purification issues. Furthermore, when discussing the use of scavenger resins it is important to think about the different types of solid support "beads" that will hold the selected functional group. These polymer beads can be describe most often in two ways, lightly crosslinked and highly crosslinked. The different solid supports are chosen at the preference of the chemist.

== Lightly crosslinked resins ==
Lightly crosslinked refers to the lightly woven polymer portion of the scavenger. This type of resin becomes swollen in a particular solvent, allowing an impurity to react with a specified functional group. In many times single solvents are not sufficient to expand the resin, in which case a second solvent must be added. Examples of a secondary solvent, or co-solvent, would be Tetrahydrofuran, or THF. Typically contain 1–3% of divinylbenzene.

== Highly crosslinked resins ==
Highly crosslinked resins typically swell much less than the latter. The property that allows these types of resins to work efficiently lies in their porous properties. The reacting compound can diffuse through the porous layer of the resin to converge with the scavenger's functional group. These types of resins are utilized in situations where swelling of the resins may cause a physical barrier to reaction purification. Contain much higher content of divinylbenzene.

== Commercial use ==
Organic scavenger resins have been used commercially in water filters as early as 1997. As an alternative to reverse osmosis, organic anion resins (scavenger resins) have been used to remove impurities from drinking water. These types of resins are able to remove the negatively charged organic^{[verification needed]} molecules in water, like bicarbonates, sulfates, and nitrates. It has been estimated that 60–80% of organic impurities in water may be remove using these methods.

== Advantages ==
- Rapid purification time: Products can be purified in short periods of time, relative to traditional techniques
- Product remains in solution: The product is not removed from solution, as in crystallization techniques.
- Reaction may be monitored: The purification process is controlled
- Traditional purity techniques may be employed
- Can be used in excess
- Removed by filtration
- Allow for the synthesis of complex compound libraries
- Can be customized: Different scavenger resins employed for different impurities.
- High solvent compatibility (can be used with many solvents)

== Disadvantages ==
- Large quantities are in some cases required to remove impurities
- May pose barriers on small scale reactions by "clogging up" the test tube reaction
- Dependent upon reagent to be removed

== See also ==
- Benzaldehyde
- Dynamic combinatorial chemistry
- Drug discovery
- High-throughput screening
- Chemical library
- List of purification methods in chemistry
