= Stuart Clark (author) =

English astronomer

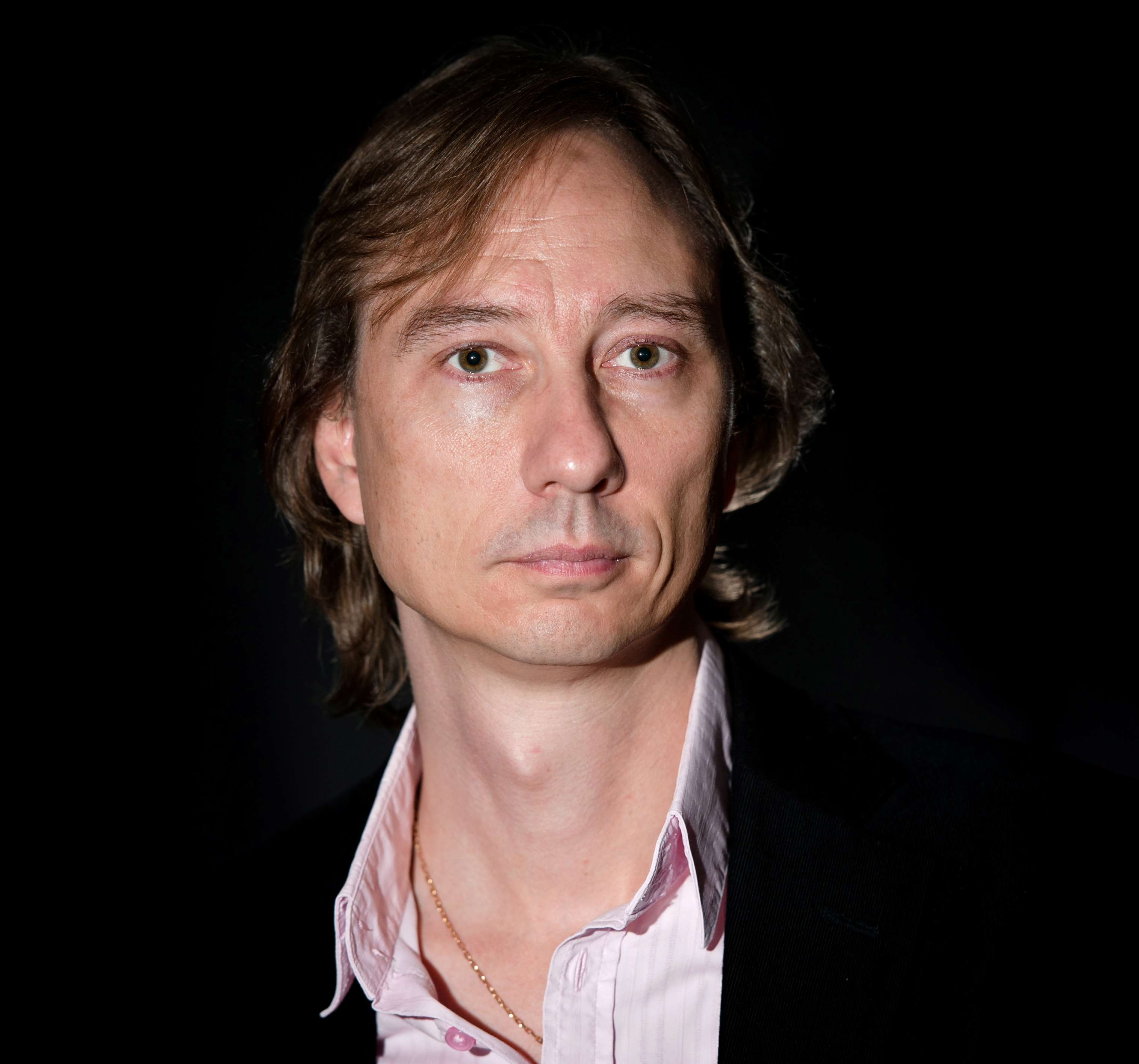
- Clark in 2013
- Occupation: Writer
- Writing career
- Genres: Novels, Astronomy
- Website: www.stuartclark.com

Stuart Clark is an English writer and astronomy journalist. His career is devoted to presenting astronomy to the general public, both as semi-fictional novels of past scientists and as popularised astronomy articles.

== Short biography ==
Clark holds a first class honours degree and a PhD in astrophysics. He is a Fellow of the Royal Astronomical Society and a former Vice Chair of the Association of British Science Writers. On 9 August 2000, UK daily newspaper The Independent placed him alongside Stephen Hawking and the Astronomer Royal, Professor Sir Martin Rees, as one of the 'stars' of British astrophysics teaching.

Currently he divides his time between writing books and, in his capacity of cosmology consultant, writing articles for New Scientist. He writes for the European Space Agency where he was Senior Editor for Space Science for some time. Over the years Clark has written for amongst others: BBC Sky at Night, BBC Focus, The Times, The Guardian, The Economist, The Times Higher Education Supplement, Daily Express, Astronomy Now and Sky and Telescope.

Until 2001, Clark was the Director of Public Astronomy Education at the University of Hertfordshire. There he taught undergraduates, postgraduates and the general public, whilst researching star formation, planetary habitability and the origins of life. In a paper published by Science in 1998, he helped develop the current paradigm that the left-handed amino acids necessary for the origin of life on Earth were synthesised in star-forming regions spread throughout the Galaxy.

In 2001, Clark decided to increase his part-time writing to a full-time occupation. He remains a visiting fellow promoting the university and contributing to observatory open nights. Having crossed from mainstream science into science journalism, he now spends his working life translating astronomy, space research and physics into comprehensible language for the general public. Clark has also been the accompanying astronomer on a cruise ship and on an eclipse tour to China. He frequently lectures to the public up and down the UK and, increasingly, across the world.

== Selected bibliography ==
- Beneath the Night (How the Stars Have Shaped the History of Humankind), Guardian Faber, 2020
- The Unknown Universe (A New Exploration of Time, Space, and Modern Cosmology), Pegasus, 2016
- The Day Without Yesterday (The Sky's Dark Labyrinth Trilogy: Book III), Polygon, 2013
- The Sensorium of God (The Sky's Dark Labyrinth Trilogy: Book II), Polygon, 2012
- The Sky's Dark Labyrinth (The Sky's Dark Labyrinth Trilogy: Book I), Polygon, 2011
- Voyager: 101 Wonders Between Earth and the Edge of the Cosmos, Atlantic, 2012
- The Big Questions: The Universe, Quercus Publishing, 2010
- Galaxy Exploring the Milky Way, Barnes and Noble, 2008 (UK: Quercus, 2009)
- Deep Space The Universe from the beginning, Barnes and Noble, 2007 (UK: Quercus, 2008)
- The Sun Kings: The Unexpected Tragedy of Richard Carrington and the Tale of How Modern Astronomy Began (shortlisted by the Royal Society for their 2008 general science book prize), Princeton University Press, 2009
- Journey to the Stars, Oxford University Press, 2000
- Life on Other Worlds and How to Find It, Springer-Praxis, 2000
- Universe in Focus: The Story of the Hubble Space Telescope, Andromeda, 1997 (updated 1998)

Clark has contributed to, as well as performing in, the National Geographic programme Storm Worlds. His other numerous television and radio contributions in person include Radio 4's Material World, Radio 3's The Essay, BBC's Tomorrow's World and Nine O'clock News, and Channel 4's Big Breakfast.
