= Leslie Kean =

American investigative journalist and author

- Citizenship: American
- Education: Spence School; Bard College
- Occupation: investigative journalist
- Relatives: Robert Kean (grandfather); Thomas Kean (uncle)
- Website: lesliekean.com

Leslie Kean is an American investigative journalist and author of books about UFOs and the afterlife.

== Early life and education ==
Kean is the daughter of environmentalist and philanthropist Hamilton Fish Kean (1925–2016) and the granddaughter of Congressman Robert Kean. Her uncle is former New Jersey Governor Thomas Kean, and her cousin is Congressman Thomas Kean Jr. The New Yorker reported in 2021 that she has "a modest family income" (income derived from inherited wealth).

She grew up in New York City and attended Spence School and Bard College, and helped "to found a Zen center in upstate New York".

== Career ==
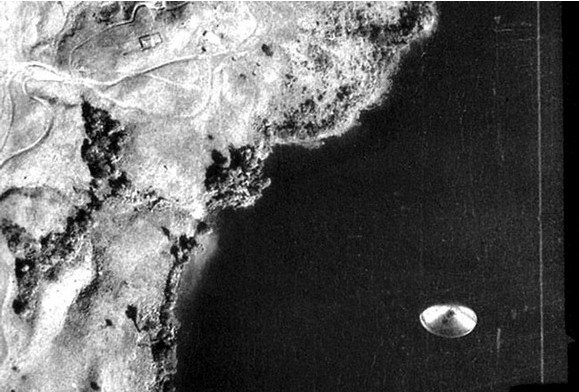
An aerial photo of Lake Cote with a purported UFO taken in 1971 by the Costa Rican National Geographic Institute and given to Kean by the Costa Rican government

Kean worked as a photographer at the Lab of Ornithology at Cornell University.

After visiting Burma to interview political prisoners in the 1990s, she began working as an investigative journalist, producer, and on-air host at KPFA, a Berkeley, California-based radio station and the flagship station of the Pacifica Radio Network and for Flashpoints, a left-wing drive-time news program covering wrongful convictions, the death penalty, and other criminal-justice issues.

Kean has published works relating to UFOs since 2000, and has been a guest on Coast to Coast AM. Her book UFOs: Generals, Pilots and Government Officials Go on the Record, published by Penguin Random House, was a New York Times best seller. Kean belongs to the UFO organization UFODATA.

On December 16, 2017, The New York Times featured an article written by Helene Cooper, Ralph Blumenthal and Kean, which revealed the fact that the U.S. Department of Defense had spent $22.5M on a secret program titled the Advanced Aerospace Threat Identification Program that investigated UFOs.

According to Gideon Lewis-Kraus in April 2021, Kean has a photo of a purported UFO hanging on a wall behind her desk that was gifted to her by the Costa Rican government. This photo was taken by the Costa Rican National Geographic Institute in 1971 over Lake Cote and is considered by Kean to be "the finest image of a U.F.O. ever made public". On 5 June 2023, Kean and writer Ralph Blumenthal reported that former United States Air Force officer and intelligence official David Grusch claimed that the United States has a secret UFO retrieval program with multiple vehicles of non-human origin as well as records of dead pilots in its possession.

== Written works ==
- 1994. Burma's Revolution of the Spirit: The Struggle for Democratic Freedom and Dignity, with Alan Clements. New York : Aperture. ISBN 978-0893815806.
- 2010. UFOs: Generals, Pilots and Government Officials Go on the Record, with a foreword by John Podesta. New York: Harmony Books. ISBN 978-0307716842.
- 2017. Surviving Death: A Journalist Investigates Evidence for an Afterlife. New York: Crown Archetype. ISBN 978-0553419610.
