= Futurism (website) =

American science and technology news website

- Available in: English, Arabic
- Founders: Alex Klokus, Jordan Lejuwaan
- Website: futurism.com
- Launched: 2017; 9 years ago
- Current status: Online

Futurism is a science and technology news website founded in 2017 by Alex Klokus and Jordan Lejuwaan. It was acquired by Singularity University in 2019 and by Recurrent Ventures in 2021.

== History ==
Alex Klokus and Jordan Lejuwaan founded Futurism through a Knight Foundation grant in 2017. Jolene Creighton, who helped launch Futurism, joined the website as its editor-in-chief. Forbes reported later that year that the site received more than three million unique visitors a month, with its media content generating over 140 million monthly views.

Futurism entered into partnerships with the Prime Minister's office in Dubai to offer an Arabic language version of Futurism, and with the White House for "South by South Lawn" and other events. The company established a "native advertising arm" with partnerships with Nokia and other companies. Prior to the company's formal launch, it was a technology meet-up discussion group in New York City.

Klokus and Futurism co-founder Jordan Lejuwaan were inducted into the media category of Forbes 30 Under 30 in 2017.

In November 2017, at the height of the Me Too Movement, Futurism was pulled into controversy when it came to light that the publication had a promotional partnership with George Takei, who had recently faced sexual misconduct allegations. Creighton announced that the publication had severed all ties with Takei, saying, "Futurism holds itself and all its partners to the highest ethical standards, and we were unsettled to learn about the recent allegations against George Takei. We are no longer pursuing a relationship with him or his distribution channels." The sexual assault allegations against Takei were later recanted.

Futurism was acquired by Singularity University in 2019, before subsequently being sold to Recurrent Ventures in July 2021. That year, Futurism interviewed the head of NASA and reported on the COVID-19 lab leak theory, The New York Times accidentally publishing an article about watermelons being found on Mars, as well as the release of 500 million gene-hacked mosquitoes in Florida.

== Associated ventures ==
=== Gravity Blanket ===
The Gravity Blanket is a crowdfunded weighted blanket product originally developed by Futurism which received generally favorable reviews from customers and the media, being considered one of the best inventions of 2018 by Time magazine. When Futurism was sold to Singularity University, the Gravity Blanket was spun off into its own company, Gravity Brand Holdings LLC.
