= Geoffrey James Clark =

CEO, American film producer

- Born: June 12, 1981 (age 45); La Crescenta, California, U.S.
- Occupations: CEO, Producer, Director, Streaming Executive
- Years active: 2012–present

Geoffrey James Clark (born June 12, 1981) is an American film and television director, producer and streaming entertainment executive. He is mostly known for producing unscripted content with a cause, inspirational story, or social action element. He is currently the CEO of Documentary+, a documentary focused subscription streaming service. He is also CEO of acTVe Streaming television, and co-founder of Free Live Sports - a sports focused streaming platform.

== Career history ==
Clark has been credited as a producer and executive producer in numerous film and television projects. His credits in television include Travel Channel's "Trip Testers", HGTV's "Million Dollar Closet's", YouTube Red's "Provocateur", Nat Geo Wild's "Worlds Weirdest: Animal Apocalypse", and Esquire's "The Short Game", amongst others. Additionally, he has developed and sold numerous other unscripted projects while acting as Owner of Something Kreative Studios as well as the head of Development for Goodbye Pictures.

In 2014, Clark partnered with attorney and producer Lisa Lapan to launch Something Kreative Studios, a packaging, production and distribution company. SK has produced/distributed/represented numerous documentary films "Isolated", "Extinction Soup", "The Essence of Surfing", and the film "Sweet Micky for President", which won both the Jury and Audience Awards at the 2015 Slamdance Film Festival.

Clark recently executive produced the documentary film Isolated, with actor Ryan Phillippe who is also the voiceover on the film. Rolling Stone magazine featured an article about Isolated., and Phil Hall from FilmThreat reviewed the film as "...the best non-fiction film of 2013".

In the past, Clark produced the independent horror film Automaton Transfusion, which was released through Dimension Films. Automaton Transfusion was shot independently on a very low budget and bought by the Weinstein Co. after a large amount of industry and entertainment buzz. Dimension Extreme released the film on DVD internationally in January 2006. Geoffrey also produced the documentary film The Forgotten Coast, and The Arena: North Shore, both of which were directed by Justin LePera. Both documentary surf films played at film festivals worldwide and received critical acclaim and festival awards.

Since 2014 Clark became a contributing writer to top industry publication TheInertia.com, joined the advisory board of the La Costa Film Festival and has been featured as a guest on numerous media outlets including CBS News, Right This Minute on FOX, Cheddar and on CNN's Piers Morgan Live alongside Ryan Phillippe.

In 2017, Clark became the president of Futurism Studios, a media/production company based out of Brooklyn, NY. Their first documentary film, Trust Machine, was produced by Clark, Kim Jackson, and Alex Winter, who also directed the film. After a successful NY and LA theatrical run, the film qualified for 2018 Oscar consideration. Clark also executive produced and showran the Facebook Watch series "Glimpse", which was produced in partnership with Gunpowder & Sky's science fiction label DUST.

In 2019, Clark wrote, directed and produced the scripted short film "SophiaWorld", starring actress Evan Rachel Wood and real humanoid robot, Sophia the Robot. The Futurism-produced 5-minute sci-fi comedy short premiered at the 2019 Maui Film Festival on June 16, 2019.

== Education ==
Clark graduated with honors from Cal State Long Beach University, majoring in film & digital production. Out of high school he was highly recruited and chose to compete on the CSULB track & field team as a pole vaulter and javelin thrower. He graduated as an Academic-Athlete All American in 2002.

== Personal life ==
Geoff became engaged to actress Leven Rambin in the Bahamas in late 2009. They broke off the engagement September 2011. Geoff's favorite sports are surfing, football and baseball.
