= Targ (surname) =

Targ is a surname. Notable people with the surname include:

- Elisabeth Targ (1961–2002), American psychiatrist
- Joan Targ (1937–1998), American educator
- Russell Targ (born 1934), American parapsychologist
- William Targ (1907–1999), American book editor
