= Nowy Targ (disambiguation) =

Nowy Targ (Polish: Nowy Targ; literally: "New Market") is a town in Podhale, Lesser Poland, Poland, and the seat of the eponymous commune and county.

Nowy Targ may also refer to:

== Places in Poland ==
- Gmina Nowy Targ (Polish: gminy Nowy Targ), a gmina (municipality) in Nowy Targ County, Lesser Poland Voivodeship
- Nowy Targ County (Polish: powiat nowotarski), Lesser Poland Voivodeship
- Nowy Targ, Pomeranian Voivodeship (Polish: Nowy Targ), a village in Stary Targ, Sztum, Pomerania

== Other uses ==
- Nowy Targ Airport, in Nowy Targ County, Podhale, Lesser Poland, Poland
- KS Nowy Targ (disambiguation), several sports clubs

== See also ==
- Nowotarski (disambiguation), adjectival form
- Targ (disambiguation)
