= Nowotarski =

Nowotaski may refer to:

== Places ==
- Nowy Targ (disambiguation), from its adjectival form
- Nowy Targ County, a.k.a. Nowotarski County, in Podhale, Lesser Poland, Poland

== People ==
- Antal Nowotarski (1825–1901), Hungarian botanist; see List of Hungarian botanists
- Bernie Nowotarski, an American football coach and GM for the indoor gridiron football team Harrisburg Stampede
- Casimir Nowotarski, a soccer player for FC Gueugnon
- Jakub Nowotarski, the developer of quantile regression averaging
- Natalie Nowotarski, Australian photographer who was a finalist for National Photographic Portrait Prize

== See also ==
- The dictionary definition of Nowy Targ at Wiktionary
