= United States Army Foreign Intelligence Command =

U.S. Army Foreign Intelligence Command
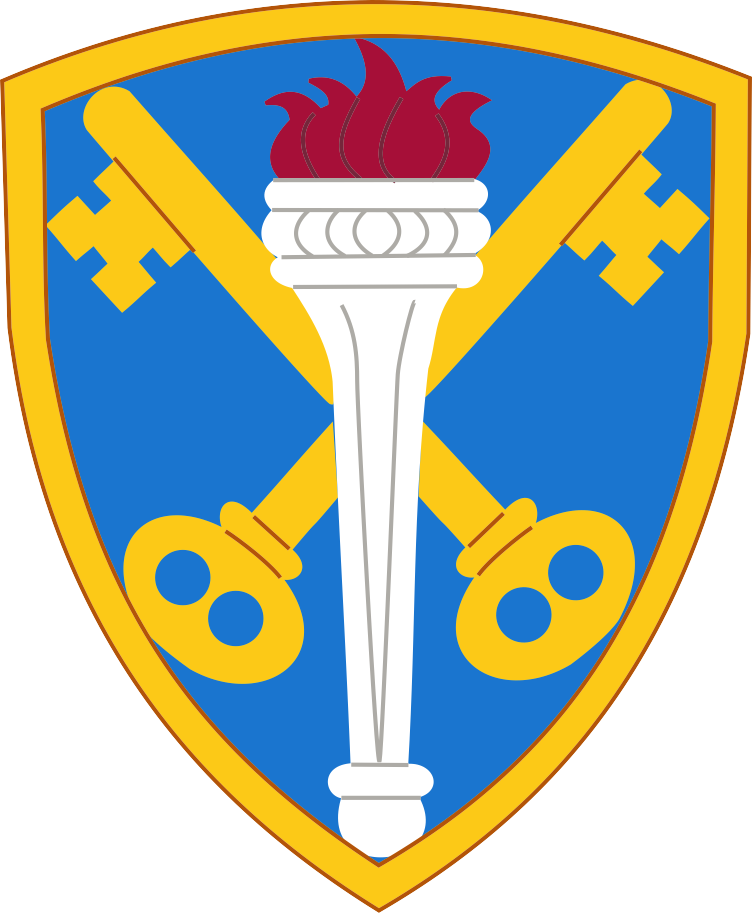
- Active: February 1993 - February 1994
- Country: United States
- Branch: United States Army
- Role: Military Intelligence
- Size: Command
- Part of: INSCOM
- Garrison/HQ: Fort Meade, Maryland

Commanders
- Commander: Mr. Dan O'Brien

Insignia
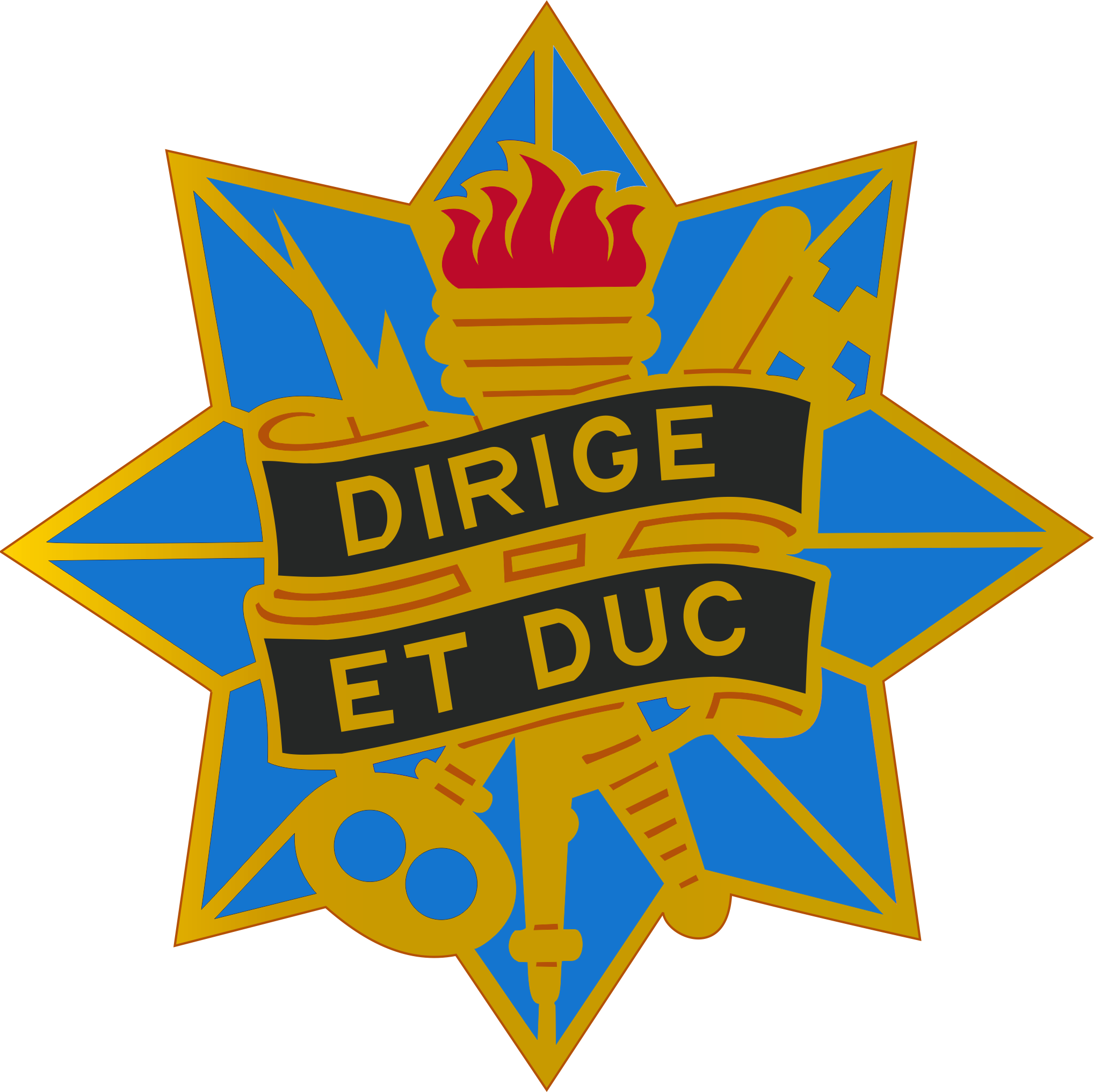
- US Army Foreign Intelligence Command DUI

The United States Army Foreign Intelligence Command (USAFIC) (Provisional) was a military intelligence command of the U.S. Army that directed intelligence operations overseas, outside of the continental United States. It was created by INSCOM to centralize human intelligence (HUMINT) and counterintelligence units at various field bases for the Department of Defense and the Department of the Army.

It was provisionally organized at Fort George G. Meade, Maryland, on 1 February 1992, and established on 1 January 1993. The USAFIC was under the command of Mr. Dan O'Brien, the deputy for operations. During its brief tenure, the USAFIC was in charge of the Star Gate Project.

At the same time, the Army was reducing its footprint in Europe and Panama due to end of the Cold War and the return of the Panama Canal to Panama. The Secretary of Defense decided to centralize defense human intelligence services under the control of the Defense Intelligence Agency and the Deputy Chief of Staff for Operations and Plans. INSCOM changed how it was operating and no longer was acting at the corps level, but at the lower unit levels. The Foreign Intelligence Command was abolished on 31 January 1994.

== Insignia ==
The shoulder sleeve insignia (SSI) is an oriental blue shield with gold crossed keys under a white torch with a red flame.

The distinctive unit insignia (DUI) is an oriental blue eight pointed star with a crossed lightning sword and key under a torch with a scroll over all with the motto "Dirige Et Duc" (Direct and Lead).

== Media ==
Project Star Gate was satirized (never mentioned by name) in the 2009 movie and 2004 book (Jon Ronson) The Men Who Stare at Goats.
