= Remote viewing =

Pseudoscientific concept

- Claims: The alleged paranormal ability to perceive a remote or hidden subject without support of the senses.
- Year proposed: 1970
- Original proponents: Russell Targ and Harold E. Puthoff
- Subsequent proponents: Ingo Swann, Joseph McMoneagle, Courtney Brown

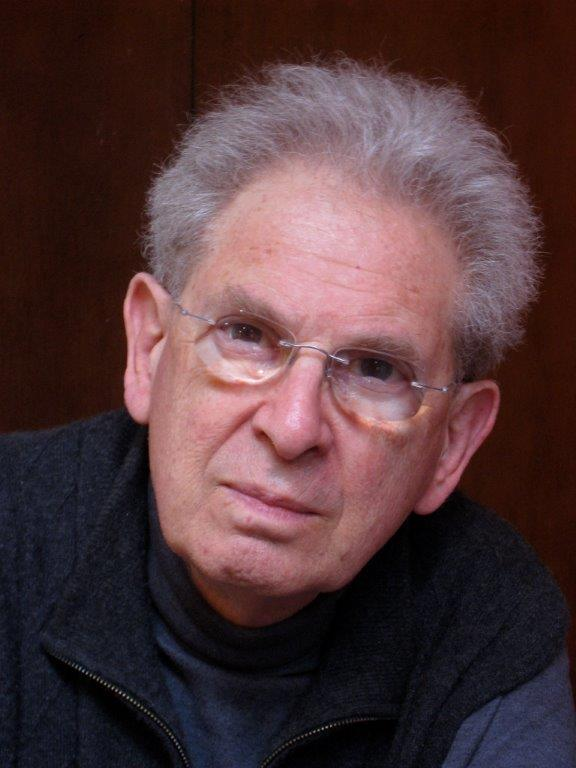
Physicist Russell Targ

Remote viewing (RV) is the practice of seeking impressions about a distant or unseen subject, purportedly sensing with the mind. There is no scientific evidence that remote viewing is possible, and it is generally regarded as a pseudoscience. A remote viewer is expected to give information about an object, event, person, or location hidden from physical view and separated at some distance. Physicist Russell Targ and electrical engineer and parapsychologist Harold E. Puthoff, parapsychology researchers at Stanford Research Institute (SRI), are generally credited with coining the term "remote viewing" to distinguish it from the closely related concept of clairvoyance. According to Targ, the term was first suggested by Ingo Swann in December 1971 during an experiment at the American Society for Psychical Research in New York City.

Remote viewing experiments have historically lacked proper controls and repeatability.

The idea of remote viewing received renewed attention in the 1990s upon the declassification of documents related to the Stargate Project, a $20 million research program sponsored by the U.S. government that attempted to determine potential military applications of psychic phenomena. The program ran from 1975 to 1995 and ended after evaluators concluded that remote viewers consistently failed to produce actionable intelligence information.

== History ==
=== Early background ===
In early occult and spiritualist literature, remote viewing was known as telesthesia and traveling clairvoyance. Rosemary Guiley described it as "seeing remote or hidden objects clairvoyantly with the inner eye, or in alleged out-of-body travel."

The study of psychic phenomena by major scientists started in the mid-nineteenth century. Early researchers included Michael Faraday, Alfred Russel Wallace, Rufus Osgood Mason, and William Crookes. Their work predominantly involved carrying out focused experimental tests on individuals thought to be psychically gifted. Reports of apparently successful tests were met with much skepticism from the scientific community.

In the 1930s, J. B. Rhine expanded the study of paranormal performance into larger populations by using standard experimental protocols with unselected human subjects. But, as with the earlier studies, Rhine was reluctant to publicize this work too early because of the fear of criticism from mainstream scientists.

Paranormal studies remained a fringe area of scientific exploration. However, by the 1960s, the prevailing counterculture attitudes were sympathetic to paranormal ideas. The emergence of what is termed "New Age" thinking and the popularity of the Human Potential Movement provoked a mini-renaissance that renewed public interest in consciousness studies and psychic phenomena. It also helped to make financial support more available for research into such topics.

In the early 1970s, Harold Puthoff and Russell Targ joined the Electronics and Bioengineering Laboratory at Stanford Research Institute (SRI, now SRI International), where they initiated studies of the paranormal that were, at first, supported with private funding from the Parapsychology Foundation and the Institute of Noetic Sciences.

In the late 1970s, the physicists John Taylor and Eduardo Balanovski tested the psychic Matthew Manning in remote viewing, and the results proved "completely unsuccessful".

One of the early experiments, lauded by proponents as having improved the methodology of remote viewing testing and raising future experimental standards, was criticized as leaking information to the participants by inadvertently leaving clues. Some later experiments had negative results when these clues were eliminated. (Note: From An Encyclopedia of Claims, Frauds, and Hoaxes of the Occult and Supernatural by James Randi: "The data of Puthoff and Targ were reexamined by the other researchers, and it was found that their students were able to solve the locations without use of any psychic powers, using only the clues that had inadvertently been included in the Puthoff and Targ transcripts.")

The viewers' advice in the Stargate Project was always so unclear and non-detailed that it has never been used in any intelligence operation. (Note: Mumford, Rose and Goslin wrote, in An Evaluation of Remote Viewing: Research and Applications: "remote viewings have never provided an adequate basis for 'actionable' intelligence operations – that is, information sufficiently valuable or compelling so that action was taken as a result (...) a large amount of irrelevant, erroneous information is provided and little agreement is observed among viewers' reports. (...) remote viewers and project managers reported that remote viewing reports were changed to make them consistent with known background cues. While this was appropriate in that situation, it makes it impossible to interpret the role of the paranormal phenomena independently. Also, it raises some doubts about some well-publicized cases of dramatic hits, which, if taken at face value, could not easily be attributed to background cues. In at least some of these cases, there is reason to suspect, based on both subsequent investigations and the viewers' statement that reports had been "changed" by previous program managers, that substantially more background information was available than one might at first assume.") In a 2005 interview with GQ magazine, former president Jimmy Carter recalled a time during his presidency when the administration was searching for a small twin-engine plane that had gone down somewhere in Africa. According to Carter's recollection, the director of the CIA told him that the plane had been located by a woman in California who claimed to be a psychic medium. Carter recalled he responded to the claim "with skepticism", saying "Whether it was just a gross coincidence or... I don't know."

=== Decline and termination ===
In the early 1990s, the Military Intelligence Board, chaired by Defense Intelligence Agency chief Harry E. Soyster, appointed Army Colonel William Johnson to manage the remote viewing unit and evaluate its objective usefulness. Funding dissipated in late 1994, and the program declined. The project was transferred from DIA to the CIA in 1995.

In 1995, the CIA hired the American Institutes for Research (AIR) to perform a retrospective evaluation of the results generated by the Stargate Project. Reviewers included Ray Hyman and Jessica Utts. Utts maintained that there had been a statistically significant positive effect, with some subjects scoring 5–15% above chance. Hyman argued that Utts' conclusion that ESP had been proven to exist "is premature, to say the least." Hyman said the findings had yet to be replicated independently, and that more investigation would be necessary to "legitimately claim the existence of paranormal functioning". Based upon both of their studies, which recommended a higher level of critical research and tighter controls, the CIA terminated the $20 million project in 1995. Time magazine stated in 1995 that three full-time psychics were still working on a $500,000-a-year budget at Fort Meade, Maryland, which would soon be closed.

The AIR report concluded that no usable intelligence data was produced in the program. David Goslin of the American Institute for Research said, "There's no documented evidence it had any value to the intelligence community".

=== PEAR's Remote Perception program ===
Beginning in the late 1970s, the Princeton Engineering Anomalies Research Lab (PEAR) carried out extensive research on remote viewing. By 1989, it had conducted 336 formal trials, reporting a composite z-score of 6.355, with a corresponding p-value of 1.04×10^{−10}. In a 1992 critique of these results, Hansen, Utts and Markwick concluded "The PEAR remote-viewing experiments depart from commonly accepted criteria for formal research in science. In fact, they are undoubtedly some of the poorest quality ESP experiments published in many years." The lab responded that "none of the stated complaints compromises the PEAR experimental protocols or analytical methods" and reaffirmed their results.

Following Utts' emphasis on replication and Hyman's challenge on interlaboratory consistency in the AIR report, PEAR conducted several hundred trials to see if they could replicate the SAIC and SRI experiments. They created an analytical judgment methodology to replace the human judging process criticized in past experiments, and they released a report in 1996. They felt the results of the experiments were consistent with the SRI experiments. However, statistical flaws have been proposed by others in the parapsychological community and within the general scientific community.

== Scientific reception ==
A variety of scientific studies on remote viewing have been conducted. Early experiments produced positive results, but they had invalidating flaws. None of the more recent experiments have shown positive results when conducted under properly controlled conditions. This lack of successful experiments has led the mainstream scientific community to reject remote viewing, based upon the absence of an evidence base, the lack of a theory which would explain remote viewing, and the lack of experimental techniques which can provide reliably positive results.

Science writers Gary Bennett, Martin Gardner, Michael Shermer and professor of neurology Terence Hines describe the topic of remote viewing as pseudoscience.

C. E. M. Hansel, who evaluated the remote viewing experiments of parapsychologists such as Puthoff, Targ, John B. Bisha, and Brenda J. Dunne, noted that there was a lack of controls, and precautions were not taken to rule out the possibility of fraud. He concluded the experimental design was inadequately reported and "too loosely controlled to serve any useful function."

The psychologist Ray Hyman says that, even if the results from remote viewing experiments were reproduced under specified conditions, they would still not be a conclusive demonstration of the existence of psychic functioning. He blames this on the reliance on a negative outcome—the claims on ESP are based on the results of experiments not being explained by normal means. He says that the experiments lack a positive theory that guides as to what to control on them and what to ignore, and that "Parapsychologists have not come close to (having a positive theory) as yet". (Note: Ray Hyman wrote in an article in Skeptical Inquirer: "Because even if Utts and her colleagues are correct and we were to find that we could reproduce the findings under specified conditions, this would still be a far cry from concluding that psychic functioning has been demonstrated. This is because the current claim is based entirely upon a negative outcome—the sole basis for arguing for ESP is that extra-chance results can be obtained that apparently cannot be explained by normal means. But an infinite variety of normal possibilities exist and it is not clear than one can control for all of them in a single experiment. You need a positive theory to guide you as to what needs to be controlled, and what can be ignored. Parapsychologists have not come close to this as yet.")

Hyman also says that the amount and quality of the experiments on RV are far too low to convince the scientific community to "abandon its fundamental ideas about causality, time, and other principles" due to its findings still not being replicated successfully under scrutiny. (Note: Hyman also says in the Skeptical Inquirer article: "What seems clear is that the scientific community is not going to abandon its fundamental ideas about causality, time, and other principles on the basis of a handful of experiments whose findings have yet to be shown to be replicable and lawful.")

Martin Gardner has written that the founding researcher Harold Puthoff was an active Scientologist before his work at Stanford University, which influenced his research at SRI. In 1970, the Church of Scientology published a notarized letter that Puthoff had written while he was conducting research on remote viewing at Stanford. The letter read, in part: "Although critics viewing the system Scientology from the outside may form the impression that Scientology is just another of many quasi-educational quasi-religious 'schemes,' it is in fact a highly sophistical and highly technological system more characteristic of modern corporate planning and applied technology". Among some of the ideas that Puthoff supported regarding remote viewing was the claim in the 1908 book Occult Chemistry that two followers of Madame Blavatsky, founder of theosophy, were able to remote-view the inner structure of atoms.

Michael Shermer investigated remote viewing experiments and discovered a problem with the target selection list. According to Shermer, with the sketches, only a handful of designs are usually used, such as lines and curves, which could depict any object and be interpreted as a "hit". Shermer has also written about confirmation and hindsight biases that have occurred in remote viewing experiments.

Various skeptic organizations have conducted experiments for remote viewing and other alleged paranormal abilities, with no positive results under properly controlled conditions.

=== Sensory cues ===
The psychologists David Marks and Richard Kammann attempted to replicate Russell Targ and Harold Puthoff's remote viewing experiments that were carried out in the 1970s at the Stanford Research Institute. In a series of 35 studies, they could not replicate the results, so they investigated the procedure of the original experiments. Marks and Kammann discovered that the notes given to the judges in Targ and Puthoff's experiments contained clues as to which order they were carried out, such as referring to yesterday's two targets or having the session date written at the top of the page. They concluded that these clues were the reason for the experiment's high hit rates. According to Terence Hines:

Examination of the few actual transcripts published by Targ and Puthoff show that just such clues were present. To find out if the unpublished transcripts contained cues, Marks and Kammann wrote to Targ and Puthoff requesting copies. It is almost unheard of for a scientist to refuse to provide his data for independent examination when asked, but Targ and Puthoff consistently refused to allow Marks and Kammann to see copies of the transcripts. Marks and Kammann were, however, able to obtain copies of the transcripts from the judge who used them. The transcripts were found to contain a wealth of cues.

Thomas Gilovich has written:

Most of the material in the transcripts consists of the honest attempts by the percipients to describe their impressions. However, the transcripts also contained considerable extraneous material that could aid a judge in matching them to the correct targets. In particular, there were numerous references to dates, times and sites previously visited that would enable the judge to place the transcripts in proper sequence... Astonishingly, the judges in the Targ-Puthoff experiments were given a list of target sites in the exact order in which they were used in the tests!

According to Marks, when the cues were eliminated the results fell to a chance level. Marks achieved 100 percent accuracy using cues alone, without visiting any of the sites himself. (Note: Martin Bridgstock wrote in Beyond Belief: Skepticism, Science and the Paranormal: "The explanation used by Marks and Kammann clearly involves the use of Occam's razor. Marks and Kammann argued that the 'cues' – clues to the order in which sites had been visited—provided sufficient information for the results, without any recourse to extrasensory perception. Indeed Marks himself was able to achieve 100 percent accuracy in allocating some transcripts to sites without visiting any of the sites himself, purely on the ground basis of the cues. From Occam's razor, it follows that if a straightforward natural explanation exists, there is no need for the spectacular paranormal explanation: Targ and Puthoff's claims are not justified".) James Randi has written that controlled tests by several other researchers, eliminating several sources of cueing and extraneous evidence present in the original tests, produced negative results. Students also solved Puthoff and Targ's locations from the clues in the transcripts.

Marks and Kamman concluded: "Until remote viewing can be confirmed in conditions which prevent sensory cueing the conclusions of Targ and Puthoff remain an unsubstantiated hypothesis." In 1980, Charles Tart claimed that a rejudging of the transcripts from one of Targ and Puthoff's experiments revealed an above-chance result. Targ and Puthoff again refused to provide copies of the transcripts and it was not until July 1985 that they were made available for study when it was discovered they still contained sensory cues. Marks and Christopher Scott (1986) wrote, "Considering the importance for the remote viewing hypothesis of adequate cue removal, Tart's failure to perform this basic task seems beyond comprehension. As previously concluded, remote viewing has not been demonstrated in the experiments conducted by Puthoff and Targ, only the repeated failure of the investigators to remove sensory cues."

The information from the Stargate Project remote viewing sessions was vague and included irrelevant and erroneous data. The project was never useful in any intelligence operation, and it was suspected that the project managers, in some cases, changed the reports so they would fit background cues.

Marks in his book The Psychology of the Psychic (2000) discussed the flaws in the Stargate Project in detail. He wrote that the experiments had several flaws. The possibility of cues or sensory leakage was not ruled out, the experiments were not independently replicated, and some of the experiments were conducted in secret, making peer review impossible. He further noted that the judge, Edwin May, was also the principal investigator for the project, risking a significant conflict of interest. Marks concluded the project was nothing more than a "subjective delusion", and after two decades of research, it had failed to provide any scientific evidence for remote viewing.

Professor Richard Wiseman, a psychologist at the University of Hertfordshire, and a fellow of the Committee for Skeptical Inquiry (CSI) has pointed out several problems with one of the early experiments at SAIC, including information leakage. However, he indicated the importance of its process-oriented approach and of its refining of remote viewing methodology, which meant that researchers replicating their work could avoid these problems. Wiseman later insisted there were multiple opportunities for participants in that experiment to be influenced by cues and that these cues can affect the results when they appear.

== Selected study participants ==
- Courtney Brown, political scientist and founder of the Farsight Institute
- Uri Geller, the subject of a study by Targ and Puthoff at Stanford Research Institute
- David Marks, a critic of remote viewing, after finding sensory cues and editing in the original transcripts generated by Targ and Puthoff at Stanford Research Institute in the 1970s
- Joseph McMoneagle, an early remote viewer recruited to Stargate Project.
- Pat Price, an early remote viewer
- Ingo Swann, a research participant in remote viewing

== See also ==
- Astral projection
- Bilocation
- Body of light
- Divination
- Edgar Cayce
- Extrasensory perception
- List of topics characterized as pseudoscience
- Lucid dreaming
- Parapsychology research at SRI
- Project MKUltra
- Scrying
- Suspect Zero (film)
- The Men Who Stare at Goats (film)
- Third eye
