= KS Nowy Targ =

KS Nowy Targ may refer to:

- KS Górale Nowy Targ, one of two Polish Floorball League clubs located in Nowy Targ, Poland.
- KS Podhale Nowy Targ, a now defunct Polish Floorball League club located in Nowy Targ, Poland.
- KS Szarotka Nowy Targ, one of two Polish Floorball League clubs located in Nowy Targ, Poland.

== See also ==
- Podhale Nowy Targ, an ice hockey team located in Nowy Targ, Podhale, Poland.
- Nowy Targ (disambiguation)
