= Psychic Warrior (book) =

1996 book by David Morehouse

Psychic Warrior is a 1996 book written by David Morehouse.

== Contents ==
Psychic Warrior is a book in which a personal account is presented by the author of his time within a secret U.S. government project known as "Project Stargate," which focused on remote viewing—a form of clairvoyance allegedly used for espionage. Morehouse claims to have been recruited after surviving a head injury during a military training accident, which triggered a series of hallucinations that supposedly revealed latent psychic abilities. The book outlines his training and eventual disillusionment as the program allegedly shifted from passive observation to influencing targets remotely. Morehouse describes internal conflict, surveillance, and pressure from the intelligence community following his attempts to expose the project.

== Reception ==
Andy Butcher reviewed Psychic Warrior for Arcane magazine, rating it a 5 out of 10 overall, and stated that "if you are willing to make the effort to read this book, there is a lot of potentially interesting stuff here, especially for referees of modern-day horror and conspiracy games. As a factual account of a fascinating and possibly very important government program, however, it's something of a let-down."

== Reviews ==
- Bodhi Tree Book Review
