= Targ =

Targ or TARG may refer to:

- Targ (surname), a family name
- Targ (video game), a 1980 arcade video game
- Targ (Star Trek), a fictional animal from Star Trek
- In Scientology, targs are an older word for Body Thetan
- Targe, a type of shield
- Târg, a medieval Romanian periodic fair or a market town
- TARG or telescoped ammunition revolver gun, manufactured by ARES Incorporated
- Monocarboxylate transporter, or Targ, a family of transmembrane transporters

== See also ==
- House of Targ, a music venue, arcade and restaurant in Ottawa, Canada
- .20 VarTarg, a rifle cartridge
