= Courtney Brown (social scientist) =

American political scientist (born 1952)

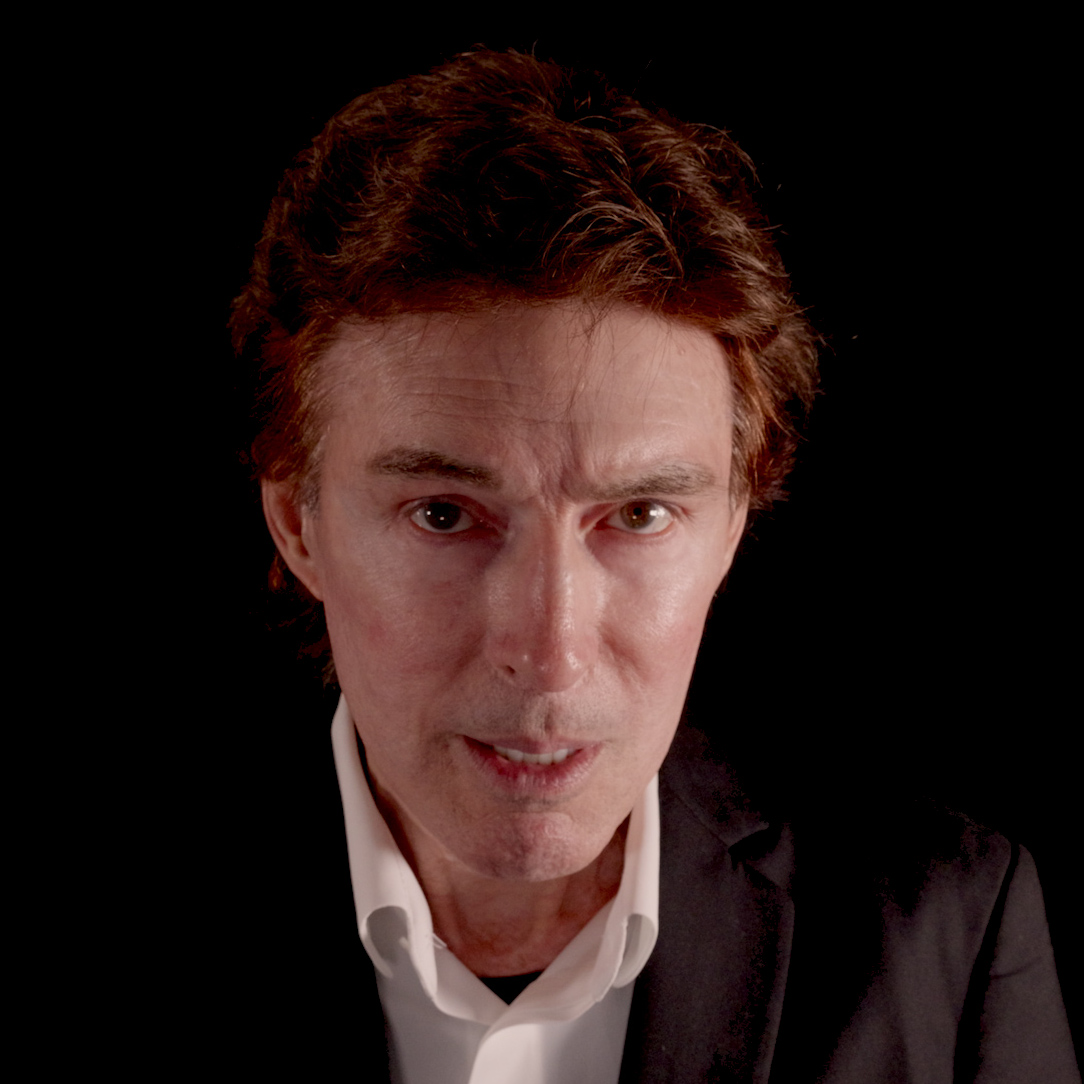
- Brown in 2024
- Born: 1952 (age 73–74)
- Education: Rutgers University; San Francisco State University; Washington University (Ph.D.)
- Scientific career
- Fields: Political science
- Workplaces: University of California, Los Angeles; Emory University
- Thesis: Catastrophe theory in the social sciences (1977)
- Website: courtneybrown.com

Courtney Brown (born 1952) is an American political scientist and parapsychologist who is an associate professor in the political science department at Emory University. He is known for promoting the use of nonlinear mathematics in social scientific research, and as a proponent of remote viewing, a form of extrasensory perception.

He is the founder of the Farsight Institute. Brown is also the CEO of Farsight Prime, a streaming service powered by Vimeo.

== Education ==
- Ph.D., Washington University, 1981
- M.A., San Francisco State University, 1977
- B.A., Rutgers University, 1974

== Applied mathematics ==
Brown's research in applied mathematics is mostly focused on social science applications of time-dependent models. He has published five peer-reviewed books and numerous articles on the subject of applied mathematics. Brown is also an advocate of the use of the R Programming Language, both for statistical as well as nonlinear modeling applications in the social sciences.

== Remote viewing ==
Brown learned the basic Transcendental Meditation and an advanced technique called the TM-Sidhi program in 1991. He claims to have engaged in "yogic flying" (a mental-physical exercise involving hopping while cross-legged) at the Golden Dome of Pure Knowledge at Maharishi University of Management in Fairfield, Iowa in 1992.

Brown's remote viewing findings have been dismissed by scientists, such as his colleague at Emory University Scott O. Lilienfeld, who has stated that Brown has refused to subject his ideas and his claimed psychic powers to independent scientific testing on what Lilienfeld describes as "curious" grounds.

Among a variety of controversial topics, Brown has claimed to apply remote viewing to the study of multiple realities, the nonlinearity of time, planetary phenomena, extraterrestrial life, UFOs, Atlantis, and even Jesus Christ. According to Michael Shermer "The claims in Brown's two books are nothing short of spectacularly weird. Through his numerous SRV sessions he says he has spoken with Jesus and Buddha (both, apparently, are advanced aliens), visited other inhabited planets, time traveled to Mars back when it was fully inhabited by intelligent ETs, and has even determined that aliens are living among us—one group in particular resides underground in New Mexico."

Martin Gardner wrote about Brown's book "Cosmic Voyage" about his remote viewing findings of extraterrestrials, "The only earlier book about UFOs I can think of that is nuttier than this one is George Adamski's 'Inside the Space Ships' (1955)."

Robert Baker writing in the Skeptical Inquirer came to the conclusion that Brown's beliefs from remote viewing about alien civilizations is a case of self-deception.

In Remote Viewing: The Science and Theory of Nonphysical Perception, Courtney Brown's work has garnered recognition from prominent scientists. Fred Alan Wolf, described it as foundational for academic studies in "subjective physics" and linked it to quantum theory. At the same time, Daryl J. Bem, praised the book for its exploration of remote viewing's creative potential.

== Publications ==
=== Political Science ===
- Ballots of Tumult: A Portrait of Volatility in American Voting (1991)
- Serpents in the Sand: Essays on the Nonlinear Nature of Politics and Human Destiny (1995)
- Politics in Music: Music and Political Transformation From Beethoven to Hip-Hop (2007)

=== Remote Viewing ===
- Cosmic Voyage: A Scientific Discovery of Extraterrestrials Visiting Earth (1996)
- Cosmic Explorers: Scientific Remote Viewing, Extraterrestrials, and a Message for Mankind (1999)
- Remote Viewing: The Science and Theory of Nonphysical Perception (2005)

=== Mathematics and Modeling ===
- Chaos and Catastrophe Theories (1995)
- Differential Equations: A Modeling Approach (2007)
- Graph Algebra: Mathematical Modeling With a Systems Approach (2007)

=== Peer-Reviewed Papers ===
- The Nazi Vote: A National Ecological Study. (1982)
- Mobilization and Party Competition within a Volatile Electorate. (1987)
- On Political Context and Attitude Change. (1987)
- Mass Dynamics of U.S. Presidential Competitions, 1928-36. (1988)
- Nonlinear Transformation in a Landslide: Johnson and Goldwater in 1964. (1993)
- Politics and the Environment: Nonlinear Instabilities Dominate. (1994).
