= Joseph McMoneagle =

American remote viewer (born 1946)

- Born: January 11, 1946 (age 80); Miami, Florida
- Military career
- Allegiance: United States
- Branch: United States Army
- Service years: 1964–1984 (20 years)
- Rank: Chief Warrant Officer
- Nickname: Remote Viewer No. 1
- Units: Stargate Project, DIA
- Awards: Legion of Merit
- Other work: Monroe Institute

Joseph McMoneagle (born January 11, 1946) is a retired U.S. Army Chief Warrant Officer. He was involved in remote viewing (RV) operations and experiments conducted by U.S. Army Intelligence and the Stanford Research Institute. He was among the first personnel recruited for the classified program now known as the Stargate Project (1978–95). Along with colleague Ingo Swann, McMoneagle is best known for claims surrounding the investigation of RV and the use of paranormal abilities for military intelligence gathering. His interests also include near-death experiences, out-of-body travel, and unidentified flying objects.

== Biography ==
=== Early years ===
McMoneagle grew up surrounded by alcoholism, abuse and poverty. As a child, he had visions at night when scared, and believed that his psychic abilities protected him when he hitchhiked. He enlisted in the Army in 1964, at the age of 18, to get away from the family turmoil.

=== Military career ===
McMoneagle's early career was as an NCO and he retired after 20 years as a chief warrant officer. He was severely injured in a helicopter accident in Vietnam. He was involved in intelligence work for 15 years. From 1978, he was known as "Remote Viewer No. 1" at Project Stargate — the U.S. Army's psychic intelligence unit at Fort Meade, Maryland.

At his retirement McMoneagle earned his Legion of Merit for his last ten years of service, including five years of work in SIGINT (SIGnals INTelligence) and five years in the RV program. He retired from the Army in 1984, but continued work as a consultant at Stargate until 1993.

=== Post-retirement ===
In 1995, funding for Project Stargate was terminated and the unit was decommissioned after the official finding that "no discernible benefit had been established". McMoneagle became a speaker at the Monroe Institute, where he had previously been sent as part of his RV training. McMoneagle then ran an RV business aimed at the corporate world called Intuitive Intelligence Applications, Inc. His services included that "he can help a wildcatter find an oil well or a quarry operator know where to mine".

== Views and assertions ==
According to McMoneagle remote viewing is possible and accurate outside the boundaries of time. He believes he has remote-viewed into the past, present, and future and has predicted events. According to Paul H. Smith, who was himself involved in the Star Gate Program, McMoneagle predicted "several months" into the future, and McMoneagle's own accounts provide differing claims of the accuracy of his remote viewing, varying from 5 to 95 percent to between 65 and 75 percent. McMoneagle claims that remote viewing is not always accurate but that it was able to locate hostages and downed airplanes. Of other psychics, he says that "Ninety-eight percent of the people are kooks." McMoneagle's claims to have predicted the passing of a teenager's "Right to Work" Bill, a new religion without the emphasis of Christianity, a science of the soul, a vaccine for AIDS, a movement to eliminate television, and a 'temporary tattoo' craze that would replace the wearing of clothing, all of which were supposed to take place between 2002 and 2006.

McMoneagle says the military remote viewing program was ended partly due to stigma: "Everybody wanted to use it, but nobody wanted to be caught dead standing next to it. There's an automatic ridicule factor. 'Oh, yeah, psychics.' Anybody associated with it could kiss their career goodbye." Supporters of his claims include parapsychologists such as Charles Tart.

McMoneagle worked with Dean Radin at the Consciousness Research Laboratory, University of Nevada, Las Vegas to seek patentable ideas via remote viewing for a "future machine" Radin conceived. McMoneagle also says he has worked on missing person cases in Washington, San Francisco, New York and Chicago, as well as employing remote viewing as a time machine to make various observations such as the origin of the human species. According to McMoneagle, humans came from creatures somewhat like sea otters rather than primates and were created in a laboratory by creators who "seeded" the earth and then departed.

== Media appearances ==
McMoneagle was featured on a National Geographic Channel episode of "Naked Science" along with parapsychologist Edwin C. May who tested McMoneagle's ability to "remote view" six locations in the San Francisco Bay area, with mixed results.

In 1994, McMoneagle appeared on an ABC network television special Put to the Test. Paranormal researcher Brian Dunning remarked, "The only thing I found impressive about McMoneagle's demonstration was their editing and narration job to make it look like the most amazing and miraculous psychic feat in history." The show took a 15-minute test and edited it down to 2 minutes leaving only what the producers felt were the best hits. After McMoneagle's vague pronouncements of a metallic sound, a pedestrian bridge, something tall that is not a building, a river or running water, something with a stripe on it and perpendicular lines.

In 1995, McMoneagle defended the Stargate program in an interview for the Washington Post.

McMoneagle co-wrote an episode of the psychic science fiction show The Dead Zone. In the episode, remote viewing was used in the hunt for Osama Bin Laden. USA Network, which aired The Dead Zone, canceled the episode's initially scheduled broadcast because of concern about the subject matter, but did air the program a few months later, after the series returned from a mid-season hiatus.

In 2002, McMoneagle started receiving regular coverage on Nippon Television's prime-time Chounouryoku Sousakan show (roughly translated, "FBI: Psychic Investigator"), during which he performed remote viewings related to unsolved police cases.

In 2004, in Jon Ronson's Crazy Rulers of the World documentary (Episode 3, "The Psychic Footsoldiers", Channel 4), McMoneagle was interviewed and vividly described his technique for traveling "out of body" to Communist China to remotely view a trigger mechanism in a military nuclear weapons laboratory.

== Books ==
- Mind Trek: Exploring Consciousness, Time, and Space Through Remote Viewing. Hampton Roads Publishing Company. 1993. ISBN 1-878901-72-9. OCLC 29858629.
- The Ultimate Time Machine: A Remote Viewer's Perception of Time and Predictions for the New Millennium. Charlottesville, VA: Hampton Roads Publishing Company. 1998. ISBN 978-1-57174-102-8. OCLC 40308919.
- Remote Viewing Secrets: A Handbook. Charlottesville, VA: Hampton Roads Publishing Company. 2000. ISBN 1-57174-159-3. OCLC 44115863.
- The Stargate Chronicles: Memoirs of a Psychic Spy. Charlottesville, VA: Hampton Roads Publishing Company. 2002. ISBN 1-57174-225-5. OCLC 50679067.
- Memoirs of a psychic spy : the remarkable life of U.S. Government remote viewer 001. Charlottesville, VA: Hampton Roads Publishing Company. 2006. ISBN 1-57174-482-7.
