= Russell Targ =

American physicist, parapsychologist, and author

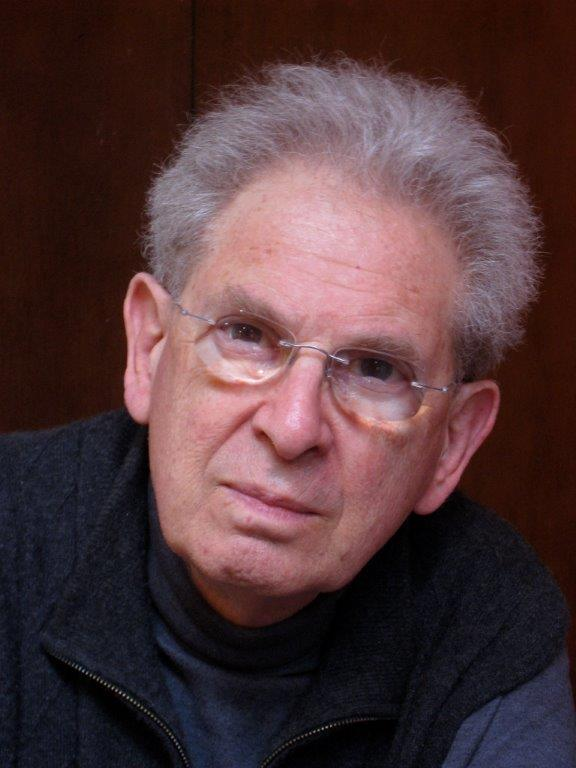
- Born: April 11, 1934 (age 92); Chicago, Illinois, U.S.
- Occupations: Physicist; parapsychologist; author
- Known for: Remote viewing
- Spouses: Joan Fischer (died 1998); Patricia Kathleen Phillips (m. 2003)
- Children: 3, including Elisabeth Targ
- Relatives: Bobby Fischer (brother-in-law)
- Website: espresearch.com

Russell Targ (born April 11, 1934) is an American physicist, parapsychologist, and author.

Targ joined Stanford Research Institute (SRI) in 1972, where he and Harold E. Puthoff coined the term "remote viewing" for the practice of seeking impressions about a distant or unseen target using parapsychological means. Later, he worked with Puthoff on the US Defense Intelligence Agency's Stargate Project.

Targ's work on remote viewing has been characterized as pseudoscience and has also been criticized for lack of rigor.

== Early life, education and career ==
Targ was born in Chicago, on April 11, 1934. He is the son of William Targ, an American book editor who was well-known and respected in the field of commercial publishing. According to Martin Gardner, Targ was introduced to the paranormal by his father whose Chicago bookstore carried a variety of paranormal works and whose later published works at Putnam included a biography of Helena Blavatsky, founder of the Theosophical Society, and Erich von Däniken's Chariots of the Gods.

Targ received a B.S. in physics from Queens College in 1954. From 1954 to 1956, he completed two years of graduate work in physics at Columbia University without taking a degree.

== Lasers and engineering research ==
Russell Targ was involved in early laser research at Technical Research Group, where he co-authored, with Gordon Gould among others, a 1962 paper describing the use of homodyne detection with laser light. Later, at Sylvania Electronic Systems, he contributed to the development of frequency modulation and mode-locking of lasers, and co-authored a 1969 paper which described the operation of a kilowatt continuous wave laser.

In 1972, Targ joined the Electronics and Bioengineering Laboratory at SRI as a senior research physicist in a program founded by Harold E. Puthoff. The two conducted research into psychic abilities and their operational use for the U.S. intelligence community, including NASA, the CIA, Defense Intelligence Agency and Army Intelligence. Targ worked at SRI until 1982.

From 1986 to 1998 Targ worked in electro-optics as a senior staff scientist at the Lockheed Missiles and Space Company, where he contributed to aviation windshear sensing applications of Doppler heterodyne lidar technology.

== Parapsychology research ==
=== Remote viewing ===
Remote viewing (or RV) is the practice of seeking impressions about a distant or unseen target using subjective means, in particular, extra-sensory perception (ESP) or "sensing with mind". Typically a remote viewer is expected to give information about an object, event, person or location that is hidden from physical view and separated at some distance. The term was coined in the 1970s by Targ and Puthoff, while working as researchers at SRI, to differentiate it from clairvoyance.

In 1972 Puthoff and Targ tested remote viewer Ingo Swann at SRI, and the experiment led to a visit from two employees of the CIA's Directorate of Science and Technology. The result was a CIA-sponsored project known as the Stargate Project. The SRI team published papers in Nature and Proceedings of the IEEE. They also presented their work in a symposium on consciousness at a national meeting of the American Association for the Advancement of Science.

Many scientific reviews of the SRI (and later) experiments on remote viewing found no credible evidence that remote viewing works; the topic of remote viewing is regarded as pseudoscience.

==== Reception ====
The psychologists David Marks and Richard Kammann attempted to replicate Targ and Puthoff's remote viewing experiments and disputed the claims that the experiments were successful; for example, they successfully identified targets from cues given by the investigators and recorded in the transcripts. They concluded: "Until remote viewing can be confirmed in conditions which prevent sensory cueing the conclusions of Targ and Puthoff remain an unsubstantiated hypothesis." The researchers said that Targ and Puthoff had not provided unpublished transcripts when requested, but that after obtaining them from a judge in the study they were able to find "a wealth of cues".

Simon Hoggart and Mike Hutchinson described Targ as willing to believe and overly credulous. A 1988 report by the United States National Research Council (NRC) concluded: "There should remain little doubt that the Targ–Puthoff studies are fatally flawed."

Remote viewing was popularized in the 1990s upon the declassification of certain documents related to the Stargate Project, a US$20 million research program that had started in 1975 and was sponsored by the U.S. government in an attempt to determine any potential military application of psychic phenomena. The program was terminated in 1995 after failing to produce useful intelligence information. David Goslin of the American Institutes for Research said: "There's no documented evidence it had any value to the intelligence community."

A variety of scientific studies on remote viewing have been conducted. Some earlier, less sophisticated experiments produced positive results but had invalidating flaws. None of the more recent experiments have shown positive results when conducted under properly controlled conditions. This lack of successful experiments has led the mainstream scientific community to reject remote viewing, based upon the absence of an evidence base, the lack of a theory which would explain remote viewing, and the lack of experimental techniques which can provide reliably positive results.

Science writers including Gary Bennett, Martin Gardner, Michael Shermer, and professor of neurology Terence Hines describe the topic of remote viewing as pseudoscience. According to Martin Gardner, Targ and Puthoff "imagined they could do research in parapsychology but instead dealt with 'psychics' who were cleverer than they were".

=== Further work on parapsychology ===
The SRI remote viewing project also encompassed the work of such consulting "consciousness researchers" as the artist/writer Ingo Swann and Military Intelligence Corps chief warrant officer Joseph McMoneagle.

Targ and Puthoff both expressed the belief that Uri Geller, retired police commissioner Pat Price and artist Ingo Swann all had genuine psychic abilities; however, flaws were found with the controls in the experiments and Geller was caught using sleight of hand on many other occasions. The SRI tests gave Geller substantial control over the procedures used to test him, with few limits on his behavior during the test.

In 1982, Targ, with Keith Harary and Anthony White, formed a company, Delphi Associates, to sell psychic consulting services to individuals and businesses. In the book Mind Race, Targ and Harary claimed that all nine silver futures predictions made at Delphi in 1982 were correct; however, a later attempt failed. According to Henry Gordon, "As with most psychic claims, there is little documentation to back them up." Ray Hyman has written "Targ and Harary's much-publicized case for the reality of psi and the validity of remote viewing is filled with exaggerated and unsupported conclusions. Their careless scholarship leads to new deceptions."

== Personal life ==
Russell was married to Joan Fischer Targ, who died in 1998. Russell and Joan had a daughter, Elisabeth Targ, who was a psychiatrist and parapsychologist and two sons Alexander and Nicholas. In 2003 Targ married artist Patricia Kathleen Phillips.

Joan Fischer Targ was the sister of World Chess Champion Bobby Fischer. In 2004 Targ assisted Fischer, who had been a fugitive in the United States since violating a trade embargo with his 1992 victory over Boris Spassky. While Fischer was detained in Japan with extradition pending, Targ worked to support a claim of German citizenship for Fischer.

In Pawn Sacrifice, a 2014 biopic of Fischer, Targ appears briefly, portrayed by Marco Verdoni.

Targ, who is legally blind, is an avid motorcyclist and has published a memoir on his experiences as a "blind biker".

== Publications ==
=== Books authored ===
- Limitless Mind: A Guide to Remote Viewing and Transformation of Consciousness. San Francisco: New World Library. 2004. ISBN 9781577314134.
- Do You See What I See: Memoirs of a Blind Biker. Charlottesville, VA: Hampton Roads. 2010. ISBN 9781571746306.
- The Reality of ESP: A Physicist's Proof of Psychic Abilities. Wheaton, IL: Quest Books. 2012. ISBN 9780835608848.
- Third Eye Spies: Learn Remote Viewing from the Masters. Newburyport, MA: Red Wheel/Weiser. 2023 ISBN 9781637480137.

=== Books co-authored ===
- —; Puthoff, Harold (1977). Mind Reach: Scientists Look at Psychic Abilities. Dell. ISBN 9780224014243.
- —; Harary, Keith (1984). The Mind Race: Understanding and Using Psychic Abilities. New English Library. ISBN 9780450061042.
- —; Katra, Jane (1998). Miracles of Mind: Exploring Nonlocal Consciousness and Spiritual Healing. New World Library. ISBN 9781577310709.
- —; Katra, Jane (1999). The Heart of the Mind: How to Experience God Without Belief. New World Library. ISBN 9781577310419.
- —; Hurtak, James (2006). End of Suffering: Fearless Living in Troubled Times...Or, How to Get Out of Hell Free. Hampton Roads. ISBN 9781612831145.

=== Journal articles ===
On remote viewing

- —; Puthoff, H. (18 October 1974). "Information transmission under conditions of sensory shielding". Letters to Nature. Nature. 251 (5476): 602–7. Bibcode:1974Natur.251..602T. doi:10.1038/251602a0. PMID 4423858. S2CID 4152651.
- Puthoff, H.E.; — (March 1976). "A perceptual channel for information transfer over kilometer distances: Historical perspective and recent research". Proceedings of the IEEE. 64 (3): 329–54. doi:10.1109/PROC.1976.10113. S2CID 12688261.
- Tart, C.T.; Puthoff, H.E.; — (13 March 1980). "Information transmission in remote viewing experiments". Matters Arising. Nature. 284 (5752): 191. Bibcode:1980Natur.284..191T. doi:10.1038/284191a0. PMID 7360248.
- — (1996). "Remote viewing at Stanford Research Institute in the 1970s: A memoir" (PDF). Journal of Scientific Exploration. 10 (1): 77–88. Archived from the original (PDF) on 2014-10-23.

On precognition

- —; Katra, J.; Brown, D.; Wiegand, W. (1995). "Viewing the future: A pilot study with an error detecting protocol". Journal of Scientific Exploration. 9: 367–80.

==== On lasers and electro-optics ====
- Rabinowitz, P.; Jacobs, S.; —; Gould, G. (November 1962). "Homodyne detection of phase-modulated light". Correspondence. Proceedings of the IRE. 50 (11): 2365. doi:10.1109/JRPROC.1962.287964.
- Harris, S.E.; — (1964). "FM Oscillation of the He-Ne laser". Applied Physics Letters. 5 (10): 202–4. Bibcode:1964ApPhL...5..202H. doi:10.1063/1.1723588.
- Massey, G.A.; Oshman, M.K.; — (1965). "Generation of single-frequency light using the FM laser". Applied Physics Letters. 6 (1): 10–1. Bibcode:1965ApPhL...6...10M. doi:10.1063/1.1754114.
- Caddes, D.; Osternink, L.; — (February 1968). "Mode locking of the CO2 Laser". Applied Physics Letters. 12 (74): 74. Bibcode:1968ApPhL..12...74C. doi:10.1063/1.1651905.
- Tiffany, W.B.; —; Foster, J.D. (1969). "Kilowatt CO2 gas-transport laser". Applied Physics Letters. 15 (3): 91–3. Bibcode:1969ApPhL..15...91T. doi:10.1063/1.1652920.
- —; Sasnett, M.W. (February 1972). "High-repetition-rate xenon laser with transverse excitation". IEEE Journal of Quantum Electronics. 8 (2): 166–9. Bibcode:1972IJQE....8..166T. doi:10.1109/JQE.1972.1076913.
- —; Kavaya, M.J.; Huffaker, R.M.; Bowles, R.L. (1991). "Coherent lidar airborne windshear sensor: Performance evaluation". Applied Optics. 30 (15): 2013–26. Bibcode:1991ApOpt..30.2013T. doi:10.1364/AO.30.002013. PMID 20700170.
- —; Steakley, B.C.; Hawley, J.G.; Ames, L.L.; et al. (1996). "Coherent lidar airborne wind sensor II: Flight test results at 2 µm and 10 µm". Applied Optics. 35 (36): 7117–27. Bibcode:1996ApOpt..35.7117T. doi:10.1364/AO.35.007117. PMID 21151317.
