= Stargate Project (U.S. Army unit) =

U.S. Army investigations of psychic phenomena

The Stargate Project was a secret United States Army unit established in 1977 at Fort Meade, Maryland, by the Defense Intelligence Agency (DIA) and Stanford Research Institute (SRI), a California contractor, to investigate the potential for psychic phenomena in military and domestic intelligence applications. The project, and its precursors and sister projects, originally went by various code names — including "Gondola Wish", "Grill Flame" and "Center Lane" under INSCOM, "Sun Streak" under the DIA and "Star Gate" under the United States Army Foreign Intelligence Command (USAFIC) in 1993, "Star Gate" and "SCANATE" under the Central Intelligence Agency (CIA), and "Project CF" — until 1991, when they were consolidated and collectively renamed the "Stargate Project".

The Stargate Project's work primarily involved remote viewing, the purported ability to psychically "see" events, sites, or information from a great distance. The project was overseen until 1987 by Lt. Frederick Holmes "Skip" Atwater (born 1947), an aide and "psychic headhunter" to Maj. Gen. Albert Stubblebine, and later president of the Monroe Institute. The unit was small-scale, comprising about 15 to 20 individuals, and was run out of "an old, leaky wooden barracks".

The Stargate Project was terminated and declassified in 1995 after a commissioned review by the CIA concluded that it was never useful in any intelligence operation. Although statistically significant effects were observed in laboratory experiments, the reviewers were uncertain whether this was the result of errors, and the information provided by the program was vague and included irrelevant and erroneous data. The program was featured in the 2004 book and 2009 film The Men Who Stare at Goats, although neither mentions it by name.

== Background ==
According to Joseph McMoneagle, the CIA and DIA reacted to reports that the Soviets were actively researching parapsychology by approving and funding their own research programs. McMoneagle wrote that reviews for these programs were made semi-annually at the Senate and House select committee level. According to McMoneagle, standard operating procedure for remote viewing was that the results were kept secret from the "viewer" so that failures would not damage the viewer's confidence and skill.

McMoneagle defines remote viewing as an attempt to sense unknown information about places or events, and said that it is normally performed to detect current events, but during military and domestic intelligence applications viewers claimed to sense things in the future, experiencing precognition.

== History ==
=== 1970s ===
In 1970, United States intelligence sources believed that the Soviet Union was spending 60 million rubles annually on "psychotronic" research. In response to claims that the Soviet program had produced results, the CIA initiated funding for a new program known as SCANATE ("scan by coordinate") in the same year. Remote viewing research began in 1972 at the Stanford Research Institute (SRI) in Menlo Park, California. Proponents (Russell Targ and Harold E. Puthoff) of the research said that a minimum accuracy rate of 65% required by the clients was often exceeded in the later experiments.

Physicists Targ and Puthoff began testing psychics for SRI in 1972, including Israeli Uri Geller, who would later become an international celebrity. Their apparently successful results garnered interest within the United States Department of Defense. Ray Hyman, professor of psychology at the University of Oregon, was asked by Air Force psychologist Lt. Col. Austin W. Kibler (1930–2008) — then director of Behavioral Research for ARPA — to go to SRI and investigate. He was to specifically evaluate Geller. Hyman's report to the government was that Geller was a "complete fraud", and as a consequence Targ and Puthoff lost their government contract to work further with him. The result was a publicity tour for Geller, Targ, and Puthoff to seek private funding for further research work on Geller.

One of the project's successes was the location of a lost Soviet spy plane in 1976 by Rosemary Smith, a young administrative assistant recruited by project director Dale Graff.

In 1977, the Army Assistant Chief of Staff for Intelligence (ACSI) Systems Exploitation Detachment (SED) started the Gondola Wish program to "evaluate potential adversary applications of remote viewing". Army Intelligence then formalized this in mid-1978 as an operational program Grill Flame, based in buildings 2560 and 2561 at Fort Meade in Maryland (INSCOM "Detachment G").

=== 1980s ===
In early 1979, the research at SRI was integrated into "Grill Flame", which was redesignated INSCOM "Center Lane" Project (ICLP) in 1983. In 1984, the existence of the program was reported by Jack Anderson, and in that year it was unfavorably received by the National Academy of Sciences National Research Council. In late 1985 the Army funding was terminated, but the program was redesignated "Sun Streak" and funded by the DIA's Scientific and Technical Intelligence Directorate (office code DT-S).

George Stephanopoulos, in his 2024 book The Situation Room, mentions the project in discussing a May 8, 1980, Situation Room briefing for President Jimmy Carter, after Carter's failed hostage rescue mission in Iran on April 24, 1980. In a 2005 GQ magazine interview, Carter said CIA director Stansfield Turner told him the agency once contacted a California woman who claimed to have psychic powers to help locate a missing plane.

=== 1990s ===
In 1991, most of the contracting for the program was transferred from SRI to Science Applications International Corporation (SAIC), with Edwin May controlling 70% of the contractor funds and 85% of the data. Its security classification was altered from Special Access Program (SAP) to Limited Dissemination (LIMDIS), and it was given its final name, STARGATE.

=== Closure (1995) ===
In 1995, the defense appropriations bill directed that the program be transferred from DIA to CIA oversight. The CIA commissioned a report by the American Institutes for Research (AIR) that found that remote viewing had not been proved to work by a psychic mechanism, and said it had not been used operationally. The CIA subsequently cancelled and declassified the program.

In 1995 the project was transferred to the CIA and a retrospective evaluation of the results was done. The appointed panel consisted primarily of Jessica Utts, Meena Shah and Ray Hyman. Utts and Hyman were appointed because, in addition to their extensive scientific credentials, they represented both sides of the paranormal controversy, although the AIR considered both of them 'fair and open-minded scientists'. Hyman had produced an unflattering report on Uri Geller and SRI for the government two decades earlier, but the psychologist David Marks found Utts' appointment to the review panel "puzzling" given that she had published papers with Edwin May, one of the main researchers on the Stargate Project, considering this joint research likely to make her "less than [im]partial".

A report by Utts claimed the results were evidence of psychic functioning; however, Hyman in his report argued Utts's conclusion that ESP had been proven to exist, especially precognition, was premature and the findings had not been independently replicated. Hyman came to the conclusion:

Psychologists, such as myself, who study subjective validation find nothing striking or surprising in the reported matching of reports against targets in the Stargate data. The overwhelming amount of data generated by the viewers is vague, general, and way off target. The few apparent hits are just what we would expect if nothing other than reasonable guessing and subjective validation are operating.

The review concluded:

The foregoing observations provide a compelling argument against continuation of the program within the intelligence community. Even though a statistically significant effect has been observed in the laboratory, it remains unclear whether the existence of a paranormal phenomenon, remote viewing, has been demonstrated. The laboratory studies do not provide evidence regarding the origins or nature of the phenomenon, assuming it exists, nor do they address an important methodological issue of inter-judge reliability.

Further, even if it could be demonstrated unequivocally that a paranormal phenomenon occurs under the conditions present in the laboratory paradigm, these conditions have limited applicability and utility for intelligence gathering operations. For example, the nature of the remote viewing targets are vastly dissimilar, as are the specific tasks required of the remote viewers. Most importantly, the information provided by remote viewing is vague and ambiguous, making it difficult, if not impossible, for the technique to yield information of sufficient quality and accuracy of information for actionable intelligence. Thus, we conclude that continued use of remote viewing in intelligence gathering operations is not warranted.

Joe Nickell wrote:

Other evaluators — two psychologists from AIR — assessed the potential intelligence-gathering usefulness of remote viewing. They concluded that the alleged psychic technique was of dubious value and lacked the concreteness and reliability necessary for it to be used as a basis for making decisions or taking action. The final report found "reason to suspect" that in "some well publicised cases of dramatic hits" the remote viewers might have had "substantially more background information" than might otherwise be apparent.

According to the AIR review, no remote viewing report ever provided actionable information for any intelligence operation.

Based upon the collected findings, which recommended a higher level of critical research and tighter controls, the CIA terminated the 20 million dollar project, citing a lack of documented evidence that the program had any value to the intelligence community. Time magazine stated in 1995 three full-time psychics were still working on a $500,000-a-year budget out of Fort Meade, Maryland, which would soon close.

David Marks in his book The Psychology of the Psychic (2000) discussed the flaws in the Stargate Project in detail. Marks wrote that there were six negative design features of the experiments. The possibility of cues or sensory leakage was not ruled out, no independent replication, some experiments were conducted in secret, making peer-review impossible. Marks noted that the judge Edwin May was also the principal investigator for the project and this was problematic, making a huge conflict of interest with collusion, cuing and fraud being possible. Marks concluded the project was nothing more than a "subjective delusion" and after two decades of research it had failed to provide any scientific evidence for the legitimacy of remote viewing.

Some members of the project expressed surprise at these findings, such as Dale Graff, who recalled his bafflement at the announcement that the project was a failure when in his experience as one of the investigators it had seemed to him to be producing definite successes. He commented that it was not surprising that no information from the project had ever resulted in military or intelligence action being taken, as the military and intelligence authorities had never really taken the project seriously and were reluctant to take action based only on Stargate data.

In January 2017, the CIA published records online of the Stargate Project as part of the CREST archive.

== Methodology ==
According to Joseph McMoneagle, the Stargate Project created a set of protocols designed to make the research of clairvoyance and out-of-body experiences more scientific, and to minimize as much as possible session noise and inaccuracy. He wrote that the term "remote viewing" emerged as shorthand to describe this more structured approach to clairvoyance. McMoneagle said Project Stargate would only receive a mission after all other intelligence attempts, methods, or approaches had already been exhausted.

McMoneagle claims that at peak manpower there were over 22 active military and civilian remote viewers providing data, and people leaving the project were not replaced so that when the project closed in 1995 this number had dwindled down to three, one of whom was using tarot cards. According to McMoneagle, "The Army never had a truly open attitude toward psychic functioning", hence, the use of the term "giggle factor". and the saying, "I wouldn't want to be found dead next to a psychic".

== Civilian personnel ==
=== Harold E. Puthoff ===
In the 1970s, CIA and DIA granted funds to Harold E. Puthoff to investigate paranormal abilities, collaborating with Russell Targ in a study of the purported psychic abilities of Uri Geller, Ingo Swann, Pat Price, Joseph McMoneagle, and others as part of the Stargate Project, of which Puthoff became a director.

As with Ingo Swann and Pat Price, Puthoff attributed much of his personal remote viewing skills to his involvement with Scientology whereby he had attained, at that time, the highest level. All three eventually left Scientology in the late 1970s.

Puthoff worked as the principal investigator of the project. His team of psychics is said to have identified spies, located Soviet weapons and technologies, such as a nuclear submarine in 1979 and helped find lost SCUD missiles in the first Gulf War and plutonium in North Korea in 1994.

=== Russell Targ ===
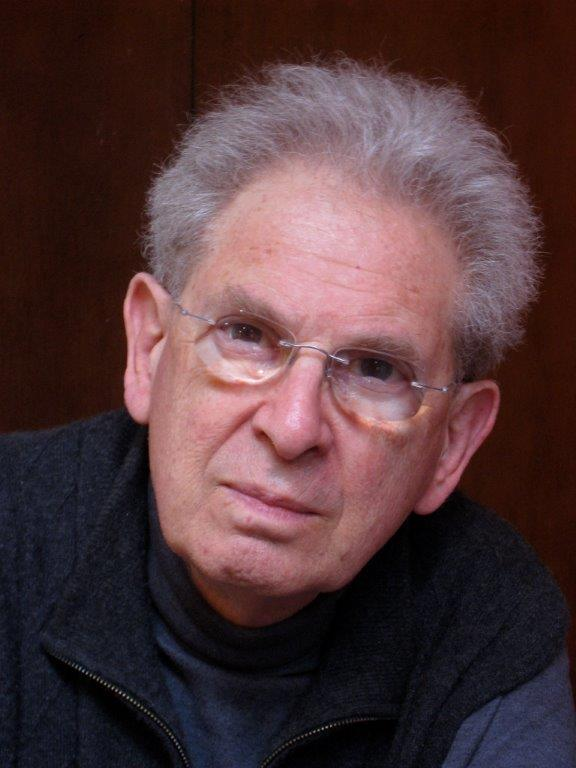
Russell Targ

In the 1970s, Russell Targ began working with Harold Puthoff on the Stargate Project, while working with him as a researcher at Stanford Research Institute.

=== Edwin May ===
Edwin C. May joined the Stargate Project in 1975 as a consultant and was working full-time in 1976. The original project was part of the Cognitive Sciences Laboratory managed by May. With more funding in 1991 May took the project to the Palo Alto offices at SAIC. This would last until 1995 when the CIA closed the project.

May worked as the principal investigator, judge and the star gatekeeper for the project. Marks says this was a serious weakness for the experiments as May had conflict of interest and could have done whatever he wanted with the data. Marks has written that May refused to release the names of the "oversight committee" and refused permission for him to give an independent judging of the Stargate transcripts. Marks found this suspicious, commenting "this refusal suggests that something must be wrong with the data or with the methods of data selection."

=== Ingo Swann ===
Originally tested in the "Phase One" were OOBE-Beacon "RV" experiments at the American Society for Psychical Research, under research director Karlis Osis. A former OT VII Scientologist, who alleged to have coined the term 'remote viewing' as a derivation of protocols originally developed by René Warcollier, a French chemical engineer in the early 20th century, documented in his book. Swann's achievement was to break free from the conventional mold of casual experimentation and candidate burn out, and develop a viable set of protocols that put clairvoyance within a framework named "Coordinate Remote Viewing" (CRV). In a 1995 letter Edwin C. May wrote he had not used Swann for two years, because there were rumors of him briefing a high-level person at Science Applications International Corporation (SAIC) and the CIA on remote viewing, aliens, and ETs.

=== Pat Price ===
A former Burbank, California, police officer and former Scientologist who participated in a number of Cold War era remote viewing experiments, including the U.S. government-sponsored projects SCANATE and the Stargate Project. Price joined the program after a chance encounter with fellow Scientologists (at the time) Harold Puthoff and Ingo Swann near SRI. Working with maps and photographs provided to him by the CIA, Price claimed to have been able to retrieve information from facilities behind Soviet lines. He is probably best known for his sketches of cranes and gantries which appeared to conform to CIA intelligence photographs. At the time, the CIA took his claims seriously.

== Military personnel ==
=== Lieutenant General James Clapper ===
The project leader in the 1990s was Lt. Gen. Clapper who later would serve as the Director of National Intelligence.

=== Major General Albert Stubblebine ===
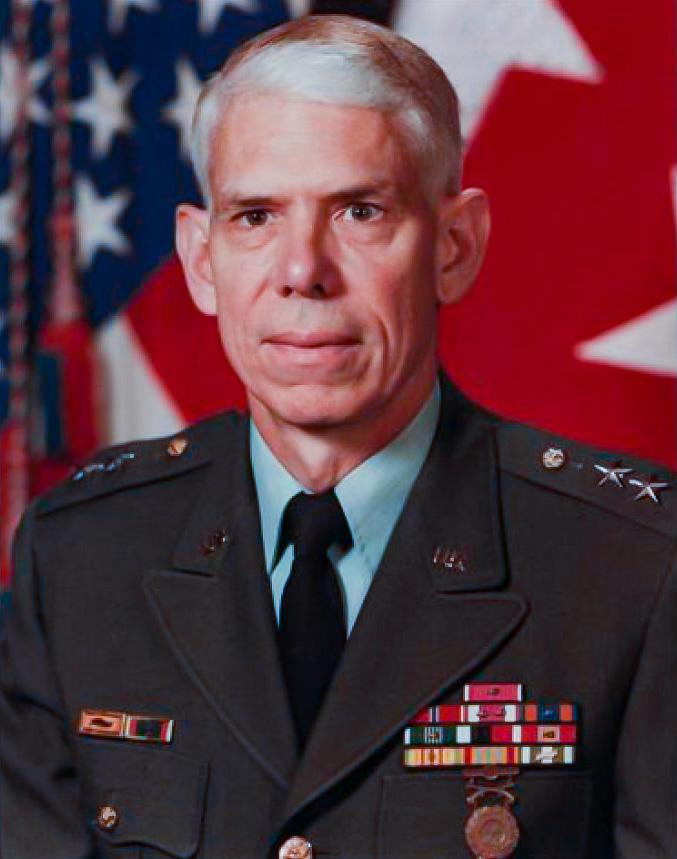
Albert Stubblebine

A key sponsor of the research internally at Fort Meade, Maryland, Maj. Gen. Stubblebine was convinced of the reality of a wide variety of psychic phenomena. He required that all of his battalion commanders learn how to bend spoons à la Uri Geller, and he himself attempted several psychic feats, even attempting to walk through walls. In the early 1980s he was responsible for the United States Army Intelligence and Security Command (INSCOM), during which time the remote viewing project in the US Army began. Some commentators have confused a "Project Jedi", allegedly run by Special Forces primarily out of Fort Bragg, with Stargate. After some controversy involving these experiments, including alleged security violations from uncleared civilian psychics working in Sensitive Compartmented Information Facilities (SCIFs), Stubblebine was placed on retirement. His successor as the INSCOM commander was Maj. Gen. Harry E. Soyster, who had a reputation as a much more conservative and conventional intelligence officer. Soyster was not amenable to continuing paranormal experiments and the Army's participation in Project Stargate ended during his tenure.

=== David Morehouse ===
In his book, Psychic Warrior, Morehouse claims to have worked on hundreds of remote viewing assignments, from searching for a Soviet jet that crashed in the jungle carrying an atomic bomb, to tracking suspected double agents.

=== Joseph McMoneagle ===
McMoneagle claims he had a remarkable memory of very early childhood events. He grew up surrounded by alcoholism, abuse and poverty. As a child, he had visions at night when scared, and began to hone his psychic abilities in his teens for his own protection when he hitchhiked. He enlisted in the Army to get away from home. McMoneagle became an experimental remote viewer while serving in U.S. Army Intelligence.

=== Ed Dames ===
Ed Dames' role was intended to be as session monitor and analyst as an aid to Fred Atwater rather than a remote viewer, Dames received no formal remote viewing training. After his assignment to the remote viewing unit at the end of January 1986, he was used to "run" remote viewers (as monitor) and provide training and practice sessions to viewer personnel. He soon established a reputation for pushing CRV to extremes, with target sessions on Atlantis, Mars, UFOs, and aliens. He has been a frequent guest on the Coast to Coast AM radio shows.

== Archives of the Impossible ==
The Archives of the Impossible (AOTI) of Rice University at Houston, Texas is a special collection founded in 2014 by Jeffrey J. Kripal, a professor of religion. AOTI is based at the Woodson Research Center (WRC) and materials are housed in the Fondren Library. AOTI holds declassified research material of the Stargate Project. Christopher Senn was identified as organizing the Stargate Project collection for Rice University. The collection was donated by Edwin May, the U.S. Army's program director from 1985 to 1995. In Routledge's Handbook of Religion and Secrecy by Hugh Urban and Paul Christopher Johnson, Kripal and Senn detailed that May's donation to AOTI encompassed thousands of pages of declassified materials. Editor Derek Askey of The Sun in 2025 detailed his visit to AOTI, and his examination of materials from the government's Stargate Project. The Stargate Project materials donated by May span from 1972 to 1995.
