= Joan Targ =

American educator (1937 – 1998)

- Born: Joan Fischer; July 8, 1937; Moscow, Soviet Union
- Died: June 2, 1998 (aged 60); Portola Valley, California, U.S.
- Spouse: Russell Targ
- Children: 3, including Elisabeth Targ
- Relatives: Bobby Fischer (brother)

Joan Fischer Targ (July 8, 1937 – June 2, 1998) was an American educator who was an early proponent of computer literacy and initiated peer tutoring programs for students of all ages.

As a child, she bought her younger brother, Bobby Fischer—widely regarded as one of the greatest chess players of all time—his first chess set and taught him how to play the game.

== Early life ==
Joan Fischer was born in Moscow, Soviet Union in 1937 to Hans-Gerhardt Fischer, a German-born biophysicist, and his wife, Regina Wender Fischer, a Swiss-born naturalized American citizen of Russian-Jewish and Polish-Jewish ancestry.

Regina Fischer left Moscow because of the persecution of Jews in the 1930s, bringing her child with her to the United States. She spoke seven languages fluently and was a teacher, registered nurse, and eventually a physician.

After living in several cities in various parts of the United States, in 1948, the family moved to Brooklyn, where Regina worked as an elementary school teacher and nurse. One year later, in Brooklyn, Joan taught her younger brother, future chess world champion Bobby Fischer, to play chess.

== Proponent of computer education ==
Targ founded several programs to study the teaching of computer literacy, including programs in the Palo Alto Unified School District, as well as the Institute of Microcomputing in Education at Stanford University.

Her educational techniques included the creation of peer tutoring systems whereby a student, trained by peers in an introductory course in computer programming, would then tutor the following students. In the early 1980s, she created and led a program sponsored by Stanford University in which high school students taught elementary school teachers the basics of programming.

One focus of her work was bringing computer literacy to girls, senior citizens, and other underrepresented groups in computing.

She coauthored the book Ready, run, fun: IBM PC edition with Jeff Levinsky.

== Personal life ==
Targ later lived in Palo Alto, California and Portola Valley, receiving a Master's degree in education from the College of Notre Dame, Belmont, California. Her husband, Russell Targ, worked at SRI International as a parapsychologist, and her daughter, Elisabeth, also became a parapsychologist.

Joan Targ was noted for her activism for organic farming, having built an organic farm soon after she married Russell Targ in 1958. In 1976, she, her husband, and another family bought 80 acres of land in Portola Valley, and they hoped to turn it into another such farm; a lawsuit from her neighbors attempting to block this use was settled in her favor shortly before her death.

== Death ==
Joan Fischer Targ died of a cerebral hemorrhage in Portola Valley at the age of 60 in 1998.

== In popular culture ==
In the 2014 Bobby Fischer biopic Pawn Sacrifice, Targ was portrayed by Lily Rabe, with Sophie Nélisse appearing as the teenage Joan.

== Additional sources ==
- Anything to Win: The Mad Genius of Bobby Fischer, television documentary, produced by Frank Sinton and Anthony Storm
- Elizabeth Field (May 5, 1982). "Ed. schools scrambling to catch up with the 'Microcomputer'". Education Week.
