= Elisabeth Targ =

American psychiatrist (1961 – 2002)

- Born: August 4, 1961; New York City, New York, U.S.
- Died: July 13, 2002 (aged 40); Portola Valley, California, U.S.
- Education: Stanford University
- Known for: Research into medicine
- Parents: Russell Targ (father); Joan Fischer (mother)
- Relatives: Bobby Fischer (uncle)
- Scientific career
- Fields: Medicine, psychiatry

Elisabeth Fischer Targ (August 4, 1961 – July 13, 2002) was an American psychiatrist, who specialized in psychic phenomena and the role of spirituality in health and healing. Targ produced a series of papers investigating the effects of prayer on AIDS patients, attempting to test the theory with a high degree of experimental rigor, with questionable results that eventually were not confirmed by a study published after her death. She died of glioblastoma, the same cancer she was studying, on July 13, 2002.

== Early life ==
Elisabeth Targ was born in New York City on August 4, 1961, daughter of Russell and Joan Targ, granddaughter to William Targ, and niece of the chess world champion Bobby Fischer.

Targ graduated from Palo Alto High School at the age of fifteen and enrolled at Stanford University at sixteen. At Stanford, Targ earned a Bachelor of Arts and Science degree in biological sciences at age 20 in 1982, a second Bachelor of Arts and Science degree in French and English literature in 1982, a Master of Science in biological sciences in 1982, and a medical degree in 1987 at age twenty-five.

According to late-life and post mortem accounts, Targ participated in many games and experiments, primarily relating to remote viewing and precognition, while growing up - guessing what her birthday and Christmas presents were before opening them, as well as the outcomes of horse races and presidential elections.

== Research on healing prayer ==
Targ is probably best known for a 1998 study that claimed prayer improved outcomes for AIDS patients. A follow-up to a 1995 pilot study of twenty case control study patients with advanced AIDS, the study was highlighted as a powerful proof of the effectiveness of prayer due to a significant difference between the control and prayer groups, as well as the rigorous methodology used - employing randomization, control groups, and when published it was portrayed as a double-blinded trial. Targ received nearly $1.5M in grant funds from the National Institutes of Health to test the effectiveness of prayer on AIDS and breast cancer patients.

However, in 2002 Wired columnist Po Bronson published an article discussing Targ, and discussing the methods and results of her study. While the study was running, the "triple cocktail" of antiretroviral drugs and protease inhibitors had a revolutionary effect on the longevity of AIDS patients, including the study's subjects. As a result, the study was unblinded partway through and the results were dredged for a significant finding. After finding no significant difference in the scores for mortality rate (the study's original outcome measure), symptoms, quality of life, mood scores (which were actually worse for the groups prayed for) and CD4+ counts, the study's statistician found that there was a significant difference between the groups for hospital stays and doctor visits. After a suggestion from an outside doctor, the group also collected data on 23 different infections commonly found in AIDS patients, using retrospective review of the patients' charts, results which were also found to be significant.

As a result, Bronson stated that the study could no longer be considered properly blinded, and was actually an example of the Texas sharpshooter fallacy when positive results are published while negative results are ignored. A peer reviewer of the study stated that had he known of the multiple attempts to find significance, the data would have required different calculations making it much less likely to have a positive result and therefore considered it a pilot study rather than a conclusive proof.

A later study listing Targ as an author was published in 2006, five years after her death. The study featured a much larger group of subjects (150 rather than 40), and concluded that the only difference between groups that received healing prayer and those that did not was that the group receiving prayer were more likely to guess they were the experimental subjects rather than the control group. There was no difference found between longevity, symptoms, or any other clinically meaningful outcome.

== Death ==
She was diagnosed with and ultimately died from one of the diseases whose treatment she had been studying, the malignant brain tumour glioblastoma multiforme. Targ underwent surgery which determined that the grade IV glioblastoma was inoperable. Targ's decline and death were watched with great interest by the community of remote healers she worked with, who prayed for her, often arriving at her house to offer their assistance while she was undergoing treatment. While pursuing psychic healing as well as intermittent radiation treatments, she married Mark Comings. Targ died on July 13, 2002 – weeks short of her 41st birthday and after several unsuccessful attempts to treat the cancer with radiation and surgery.
