= William Targ =

American book editor (1907 – 1999)

- Born: William Torgownik; 1907; Chicago, Illinois
- Died: July 22, 1999 (aged 91–92); Manhattan, New York
- Occupations: Editor, publisher

William Targ (1907 – July 22, 1999) was an American book editor, well respected in the field of commercial publishing. He is known for publishing Mario Puzo's novel The Godfather while editor in chief of G. P. Putnam's Sons.

== Life and career ==
Targ was born in Chicago, Illinois, to Russian Jewish immigrants, Esther (Silverman) and Meyer Torgownik. His name was originally William Torgownik. A high-school dropout with a passion for books and letterpress printing, Targ took a job as an office boy at Macmillan Publishers when he was 18. He opened his own bookstore at 22 in North Clark Street, Chicago.

Chapter XIII of The Vanishing Gold Truck, a 1941 novel by Harry Stephen Keeler, places Targ's bookstore at 335 South Dearborn St. and describes Targ as a "slender kindly looking young-appearing man, with blueblack hair brushed straight back from a high forehead, distinct green-brown eyes, and tweed suit." Keeler dubs the bookstore "Chicago's one and only resort for so-called 'literati.'"

From 1942 to 1964, Targ worked as an editor for the World Publishing Company, eventually becoming editor-in-chief. He then moved to G.P. Putnam's Sons where, in 1968, he bought Puzo's novel for a $5000 advance. According to the New York Times, "'The Godfather' turned out to be the most profitable single novel ever published by Putnam's and the paperback rights were sold for more than $400,000."

Outside of the commercial realm, Targ was committed to the art of bookmanship and the ideals of the private press. After retiring from Putnam in 1978, he founded Targ Editions, a one-person operation he ran from his home in Greenwich Village. Targ sought to publish works by contemporary writers that had not been previously produced in book form. The twenty-five Targ Editions include works by Henry Roth, John Updike, Saul Bellow, Tennessee Williams, Isaac Asimov, Ray Bradbury, and Norman Mailer—each book a unique volume. As Targ wrote for his Targ Editions checklist: "Each of these books is individually designed (no two formats are alike) and they are produced by letter press and are hand-bound. The various printing papers are of high quality, and enduring—mainly of rag, and deckle-edged. The bindings are of pictorial or decorated boards, and or cloth over boards. Each book is signed by its author. The editions are limited to between 150 and 350 copies each." Copies of most of the Targ Editions volumes are housed in the Fales Library and Special Collections at New York University's (NYU) Bobst Library.

In his own Targ Editions volume, Abacus Now, William Targ wrote: "Print can be as beautiful as music; it has the power to move, it is as volatile as stage magic. As a typophile and bookman, now on my own, I look more closely into the genius and works of the men and women who enriched our lives with beautiful books. I observe closely the contemporary typographic scene, the people engaged with the magical 26 letters by which we live... I don't think the private press printer will save the world; but I think that if we are seeking the pure of heart and a wholesome commitment, such a person may be found more readily beside a hand press than, say, in an advertising agency or in the House of Representatives—or in City Hall." William Targ died on July 22, 1999, at the age of 92, in his Manhattan home. He was survived by his wife, Roslyn, of Manhattan, a literary agent; a son, Russell, of Palo Alto, California; two grandchildren, one of whom is Elisabeth Targ, and four great-grandchildren.
