= Ingo Swann =

American remote viewing pioneer (1933–2013)

- Born: Ingo Douglas Swann; September 14, 1933; Telluride, Colorado, U.S.
- Died: February 1, 2013 (aged 79); New York City, U.S.
- Known for: Remote viewing

Ingo Douglass Swann (September 14, 1933 – January 31, 2013) was an American psychic, artist, and author, whose claims of clairvoyance were investigated as a part of the Central Intelligence Agency’s (CIA) Stargate Project. Swann is credited as the creator of the term "Remote Viewing", a term which refers to the use of extrasensory perception to perceive distant persons, places, or events.

== Early life ==
Swann was born in Telluride, Colorado, on September 14th, 1933. Swann claimed to have out-of-body experiences beginning at three years of age, during a tonsil removal operation, after which he began to see colorful 'auras' around certain objects. These experiences continued throughout childhood, and eventually prompted Swann to volunteer as a participant in parapsychology research at the age of 37.

== Remote viewing ==
Before severing his ties with the organization in the late 1970s, Swann was a prominent celebrity Scientologist, having attained the level of Operating Thetan through Scientology auditing. It is purported that the attainment of the level may extend one’s psychic abilities including controlled out-of-body experiences, called "exteriorization" in Scientology. In 1972, Swann first demonstrated his exteriorization skills at the Stanford Research Institute in experiments that would come to be known secularly as remote viewing. These experiments caught the attention of the CIA. He is commonly credited with proposing the idea of 'controlled remote viewing', a process in which viewers would view a location given nothing aside from its geographical coordinates, which was developed and tested by Harold E. Puthoff and Russell Targ with CIA funding.

== Uri Geller ==
Due to the popularity of Uri Geller in the 1970s, skeptics and historians basically overlooked a critical examination of Swann's paranormal claims. Uri Geller commented very favorably on Swann, saying, "If you were blind and a man appeared who could teach you to see with mind power, you would revere him as a guru. So why is Ingo Swann ignored by publishers and forced to publish his astounding life story on the Internet?"

Targ and Puthoff, two experimenters, tested Geller and Swann and concluded that they had unique skills. Others have strongly disputed the scientific validity of Targ and Puthoff's experiments. In a 1983 interview, magician Milbourne Christopher remarked that Swann was "one of the cleverest in the field".

== Out-of-body experiment ==
In 1972, in the newsletter of the American Society for Psychical Research (ASPR), their director of research Karlis Osis described his personal controlled out-of-body (OOB) experiment with Swann. The targets that Swann was to attempt to describe and illustrate were on a shelf two feet from the ceiling and several feet above Swann's head. Osis did describe the height of the ceiling. Swann suggested that the ceiling was 14 feet tall. Two kitchen-style overhead fixtures illuminated the room. Swann sat alone in the chamber, wires from electrodes fastened to his head running through the wall behind him. Swann sat just beneath the target tray. He was given a clipboard to use for sketching. Any movement while drawing did not result in "artifacts" in the brain readout. In Swann's book To Kiss Earth Goodbye there is a photograph of the objects on the shelf. Swann wrote that he knew most of the objects on a shelf above his head, but he did not know it held four numbers on a side that would not have been visible if a reflecting surface had been angled near the end.

Psychological scales were developed to rate the quality and clarity (as subjectively described) of Swann's OOB vision, which varied from time to time. The results were evaluated by blind judging. A psychologist, Bonnie Preskari or Carole K. Silfen, was asked to match up Swann's responses without knowing which target they were meant. She matched all eight sessions. Osis stressed the odds of Swann being correct were forty thousand to one. There is no record of any experiments being performed in the dark.

Silfen and Swann prepared an unofficial report of later out-of-body experiments and circulated it to 500 members of the ASPR before the ASPR board was aware of it. According to Swann, Silfen had disappeared and could not be located. While searching for her, he also sought help from the general public. Swann claimed that in April 1972, the ASPR in New York attempted to discredit him and expel him due to his affiliation with Scientology.

== Magnetometer psychokinesis tests ==
When Swann arrived at SRI, Harold E. Puthoff decided he would first be tested for psychokinesis (PK). On June 6, 1972, the two men visited Dr. Arthur Heberd and his quark detector, a magnetometer, at the Varian Physics Building. The well-shielded magnetometer had a small magnetic probe in a vault five feet beneath the floor. The oscillation ran silently for about an hour, tracing a stable pattern on the chart recorder. Puthoff asked Swann if he could affect the magnetometer's magnetic field. Swann said he focused his attention on the interior of the magnetometer and was getting nothing.

Then, there are different versions of the following events. Puthoff states that after about a five-second delay, Heberd says it was a ten- to fifteen-minute delay, the frequency of the trace recorder oscillation doubled for about 30 seconds, reportedly a common occurrence due to variations in the shared helium line to the laboratory. Heberd continued, and when the curve burped, Swann asked, "Is that what I am supposed to do?" Swann said he responded, "Is that an effect?" According to Heberd, Swann crossed the room, taking his attention away from the chart recorder. Swann said he took his mind off the machine and was sketching. Others watched the recorder to see if the irregularity would be repeated, and it was. Puthoff asked Swann, "Did you do that too?" Swann said he again responded, "Is that an effect?" According to Puthoff, Swann said he was then tired and could not "hold it any longer" and let go. The chart recorder pattern returned to normal.

More supportive sources say that Heberd supports Puthoff's version, and in the second instance, Heberd suggested he would be more impressed if Swann could stop the field change altogether. Heberd denies he told James Randi that he never suggested it. Swann recalled he heard, "Can you do that again?" from Puthoff. Swann said his feats frightened some doctoral candidates, claiming that two "virtually ran" from the room and one collided with a "totally visible" structure support.

Puthoff writes Dr. Heberd suggested that the equipment must be wrong. The following day, it was certain the magnetometer was malfunctioning. "The equipment was behaving erratically; it was not possible to obtain a stable background signal for calibration." Therefore, the experiment was not repeated. Swann related this SNAFU in his book, Remote Viewing: The Real Story. In his CIA report, paranormal expert Dr. Kenneth A. Kress does not record anything about Heberd's malfunctioning suggestions. Kress writes, "These variations were never seen before or after this visit." Though Swann was to spend a year at SRI, in their book, Targ and Puthoff present no further data and, Swann did not mention he was involved in any other PK experiments with the magnetometer than those that occurred and were recorded on June 6, 1972.

Immediately after, Puthoff wrote a brief paper in a draft form. Rather than publishing the results in a scientific journal inviting peer review, this paper was circulated hand to hand throughout research and academic institutions across the US, and Puthoff accepted invitations to speak. This paper caught the attention of the CIA and two agents paid a visit to Harold E. Puthoff at SRI and also met Swann. This paper was later published as a part of a conference proceedings.

== Early Coordinate Remote Viewing experiments ==
Targ and Puthoff write about their pilot experiments, "We couldn't overlook the possibility that perhaps Ingo knew the geographical features of the Earth and their approximate latitude and longitude. (It is Swann who suggests these Coordinate Remote Viewing tests, not the experimenters. He is in control.) "Or it was possible that we were inadvertently cueing the subject (Swann), since we as experimenters knew what the answers were."

Soon, Targ and Puthoff performed more experiments with Swann, and the controls were tightened to eliminate the possibility of error. This time Swann was given the latitude and longitude of ten targets, in the end there would be ten runs, for a total of 100. Only the evaluations of the ten targets from the tenth run, the last, were disclosed. The results of the targets from the previous ninety (runs 1–9) are ignored. Swann had seven hits for the tenth run, two neutral and one miss. The experiments came to a close. Targ and Puthoff were positive: "Something was happening, but they are not clear what it is." (This method of selecting a small number of "guesses" from a larger, sometimes never disclosed larger number, is known as the free response method in remote viewing but could be called cherry picking.) According to Swann and Stanford Research International, his RV was correct probably 95% of the time. His personally trained students' RV were 85% correct, 85% of the time. See: Stargate Project

== Swann's descriptions of Jupiter ==
Swann proposed a study to Targ and Puthoff. At first, they resisted, for the resulting descriptions would be impossible to verify. Yet, on the evening of 27 April 1973, Targ and Puthoff recorded Swann's remote viewing session of the planet Jupiter and Jupiter's moons, before the Voyager probe's visit there in 1979.

Swann asked for 30 minutes of silence. Swann said his ability to see Jupiter took about three and a half minutes. In the session, he made several reports on the physical features of Jupiter, such as its atmosphere and the surface of its core. Swann claimed to see bands of crystals in the atmosphere, which he likened to clouds and possibly like the rings of Saturn. The Voyager probe later confirmed the existence of the rings of Jupiter, although these rings are not in the planet's atmosphere. However, Swann's claim that crystals are present in the atmosphere is supported by observations by NASA's Galileo spacecraft of clouds of ammonia ice crystals in the northwest corner of Jupiter's Great Red Spot.

The following is Swann's version of his statements from 1995, 22 years after the 1973 experiments:

[6:06:20] Very high in the atmosphere there are crystals ... they glitter. Maybe the stripes are like bands of crystals, maybe like rings of Saturn, though not far out like that. Very close within the atmosphere. [Unintelligible sentence.] I bet you they'll reflect radio probes. Is that possible if you had a cloud of crystals that were assaulted by different radio waves?

[6:08:00] Now I'll go down through. It feels really good there [laughs]. I said that before, didn't I? Inside those cloud layers, those crystal layers, they look beautiful from the outside. From the inside they look like rolling gas clouds – eerie yellow light, rainbows.

[6:10:20] I get the impression, though I don't see, that it's liquid.

[6:10:55] Then I came through the cloud cover. The surface – it looks like sand dunes. They're made of very large grade crystals, so they slide. Tremendous winds, sort of like maybe the prevailing winds of Earth, but very close to the surface of Jupiter. From that view, the horizon looks orangish or rose-colored, but overhead it's kind of greenish-yellow.

[6:12:35] If I look to the right there is an enormous mountain range.

[6:14:45] I feel that there's liquid somewhere. Those mountains are very huge but they still don't poke up through the crystal cloud cover. You know I had a dream once something like this, where the cloud cover was a great arc ... sweeps over the entire heaven. Those grains which make that sand orange are quite large. They have a polished surface and they look something like amber or like obsidian but they're yellowish and not as heavy. The wind blows them. They slide along.

[6:16:37] If I turn, the whole thing seems enormously flat. I mean, if I get the feeling that if a man stood on those sands, I think he would sink into them [laughs]. Maybe that's where that liquid feeling comes from.

Swann's transcript contained in "Mind-Reach: Scientists Look at Psychic Ability" by Russell Targ & Harold E. Puthoff is slightly different from Swann's later version. There is no mention of sand and he also states, "I feel there is liquid some-where ... liquid like water."

Swann's total observations lasted for about 20 minutes. He did not mention any of the 95 moons of Jupiter. The raw data comprised only four pages, but according to Swann, the confirmatory data appeared throughout the published scientific and technical articles and papers. It was decided that all of these should be included to ensure that no scientific passage was inadvertently used out of context. The feedback data, therefore, amounted to about 300 pages.

== Brain activity during remote viewing ==
In November 2001, there was an article by Michael Persinger published in The Journal of Neuropsychiatry & Clinical Neurosciences. The results with Swann suggested that there were associated measurable changes in brain activity during his remote viewing. There was bipolar electroencephalographic activity over the occipital, temporal, and frontal lobes. Persinger concluded that there was "significant congruence" between the stimuli and Swann's electroencephalographic activity.

== Psychic detectives ==
Swann reported that out of the twenty-five criminal cases he worked on between 1972 and 1979, twenty-two were flops, and three were successes. According to Swann, Gerard Croiset and Peter Hurkos were super sensitive sleuths. Authors Arthur Lyons and Marcello Truzzi Ph.D., also a founder of the International Remote Viewing Association, wrote the Croiset and Hurkos cases were "pure bunk" in their 1991 book The Blue Sense: Psychic Detectives and Crime.

== Ufology ==
Swann was a supporter of ufology and James W. Moseley's Saucer Smear newsletter. Swann, writing "in appreciation of 'Saucer Smear' and its Esteemed Editor", wrote that "although many of its readers might view 'Saucer Smear' merely as a droll ufology gossip rag, in the larger picture it is rather more accurately a profound 'window' opening up onto the sociology of ufology. Therefore its cumulative issues constitute a precious historical archive."

In his 1998 autobiography Penetration: The Question of Extraterrestrial and Human Telepathy, Swann described his work with individuals in an unknown agency who study extraterrestrials (E.T.), his remote viewing of a secret E.T. base on the hidden side of the Moon and his "shocking" experience with a sexy scantily dressed female E.T. in a Los Angeles supermarket. He concludes that extraterrestrials are living on Earth in humanoid bodies. Swann deduces that there are many extraterrestrials, that many are "bio-androids", and that they are aware their only foes on Earth are psychics. Later, Swann and an individual known as "Mr. Axelrod" took a flight to an unknown northerly destination, deduced by Swann as possibly Alaska. Along with two "twin" bodyguards, Swann and Axelrod attempt to secretly watch a recurrent UFO appear and suck up the water of a lake. Mr. Axelrod discloses that the silent, growing, oscillating triangle is simultaneously scanning the area and eliminating any animals in the area and that the silent "beams" emanating from the object were "blasting deer or porcupines from the woods or something." The "twin" bodyguards come to the attention that they've been discovered, and the group is "attacked" by the UFO. Swann was thrown to safety by his colleagues and sustained a minor injury.

== Publications ==
- The Great Apparitions of Mary - An Examination of Twenty-two Supranormal Appearances - Copyright 1996 by Ingo Swann - Printed by The Crossroad Publishing Company, 370 Lexington Avenue, New York, NY 10017
- To Kiss Earth Good-bye: Adventures and Discoveries in the Nonmaterial, "Recounted by the Man who has Astounded Physicists and Parapsychologists Throughout the World".
- Self-help books:
  - Everybody's Guide to Natural ESP: Unlocking the Extrasensory Power of Your Mind
  - Your Nostradamus Factor — Accessing Your Innate Ability to See Into the Future
  - Psychic sexuality: The bio-psychic "anatomy" of sexual energies
- 1979 Fiction. Star Fire. 0 7221 8303 8
- 1980 book on future world events: What Will Happen to You When the Soviets Take Over?
- Autobiography: Penetration: The Question of Extraterrestrial and Human Telepathy (1998).

== See also ==
- The Men Who Stare at Goats
