= 2022 in paleomalacology =

This list of fossil molluscs described in 2022 is a list of new taxa of fossil molluscs that were described during the year 2022, as well as other significant discoveries and events related to molluscan paleontology that occurred in 2022.

== Ammonites ==
=== New taxa ===
Name	Novelty	Status	Authors	Age	Type locality	Location	Notes	Images
Acanthohoplites albedocostatus	Sp. nov	In press	Matsukawa	Early Cretaceous		Japan		
Acantholytoceras costaevariavilis	Sp. nov	In press	Matsukawa	Early Cretaceous		Japan		
Aulatornoceras beyrichi	Sp. nov	Valid	Söte & Becker	Devonian (Frasnian)	Büdesheim Formation	Germany	A member of the family Tornoceratidae. Announced in 2022; the final article version was published in 2023.	
Buedesheimites	Gen. et sp. nov	Valid	Söte & Becker	Devonian (Frasnian)	Büdesheim Formation	Germany	A member of the family Tornoceratidae. Genus includes new species B. housei. Announced in 2022; the final article version was published in 2023.	
Cadoceras (Catacadoceras) imlayi	Sp. nov	Valid	Kiselev	Middle Jurassic (Callovian)	Chinitna Formation	United States (Alaska)		
Cadoceras kniazevi	Sp. nov	Valid	Kiselev	Middle Jurassic (Callovian)		Russia		
Cadoceras (Paracadoceras) pseudofrearsi	Sp. nov	Valid	Kiselev	Middle Jurassic (Callovian)		Russia		
Cadomites zelenchukensis	Sp. nov	Valid	Mitta	Middle Jurassic (Bathonian)		Russia (Karachay-Cherkessia)		
Collignoniceras rhodanicum	Sp. nov	Valid	Amédro, Baudouin & Delanoy in Amédro et al.	Late Cretaceous (Turonian)		France		
Crassotornoceras tenue	Sp. nov	Valid	Söte & Becker	Devonian (Frasnian)	Büdesheim Formation	Germany	A member of the family Tornoceratidae. Announced in 2022; the final article version was published in 2023.	
Crioceratites tepehuaensis	Sp. nov	Valid	Esquivel-Macías et al.	Early Cretaceous		Mexico		
Cryptomorphiceras	Gen. et comb. et 2 sp. nov	Valid	Marchesi, Balini & Jenks	Late Triassic (Carnian)		United States (Nevada)	A member of Trachyceratinae. The type species is C. compressum (Johnston, 1941); genus also includes new species C. crassum, and C. levicostatum. Announced in 2022; the final article version was published in 2023.	
Dactylioceras kopiki	Sp. nov	Valid	Rogov in Rogov & Lutikov	Early Jurassic (Toarcian)		Canada (Northwest Territories); Norway; Russia? United States (Alaska)	A member of the family Dactylioceratidae.	
Diplesioceras fischeri	Sp. nov	Valid	Dietze, Schweigert & Chandler	Middle Jurassic (Bajocian)	Oolithe de Bayeux Formation	France		
Egoianites jauberti	Sp. nov	Valid	Delanoy et al.	Early Cretaceous (Barremian)		France	A member of the family Heteroceratidae.	
Epitornoceras transmediterraneum	Sp. nov	Valid	Korn & Bockwinkel	Devonian (Givetian)		Morocco	A member of the family Tornoceratidae.	
Forresteria (Harleites) seidli	Sp. nov	Valid	Summesberger et al.	Late Cretaceous (Santonian)	Gosau Group (Streiteck Formation)	Austria		
Heteroceras arnaudi	Sp. nov	Valid	Delanoy et al.	Early Cretaceous (Barremian)		France	A member of the family Heteroceratidae.	
Heteroceras munierchalmasi	Sp. nov	Valid	Delanoy et al.	Early Cretaceous (Barremian)		France	A member of the family Heteroceratidae.	
Heteroceras penagei	Sp. nov	Valid	Delanoy et al.	Early Cretaceous (Barremian)		France	A member of the family Heteroceratidae.	
Hildoceras appenninicus	Sp. nov	Valid	Ridente	Early Jurassic (Toarcian)		Italy		
Kepplerites (Gowericeras) copernici	Sp. nov	Valid	Mönnig & Dietl	Middle Jurassic (Callovian)		Germany		
Kepplerites (Gowericeras) halleyi	Sp. nov	Valid	Mönnig & Dietl	Middle Jurassic (Callovian)		France; Germany; Russia (Kostroma Oblast)		
Kepplerites (Toricellites) besseli	Sp. nov	Valid	Mönnig & Dietl	Middle Jurassic (Callovian)		Germany		
Kutatissites sudai	Sp. nov	In press	Matsukawa	Early Cretaceous		Japan		
Lentitornoceras	Gen. et sp. nov	Valid	Korn & Bockwinkel	Devonian (Givetian)	Red Ironstone Formation	Germany	A member of the family Tornoceratidae. The type species is L. materni.	
Linguatornoceras acutilobatum	Sp. nov	Valid	Söte & Becker	Devonian (Frasnian)	Büdesheim Formation	Germany	A member of the family Tornoceratidae. Announced in 2022; the final article version was published in 2023.	
Linguatornoceras sandense	Sp. nov	Valid	Söte & Becker	Devonian (Frasnian)	Büdesheim Formation	Germany	A member of the family Tornoceratidae. Announced in 2022; the final article version was published in 2023.	
Lissoceras kubanense	Sp. nov	Valid	Mitta	Middle Jurassic (Bajocian)		Russia (Karachay-Cherkessia)		
Lissoceras paviai	Sp. nov	Valid	Mitta	Middle Jurassic (Bajocian)		Russia (Karachay-Cherkessia)		
Megatyloceras leteilensis	Sp. nov	Valid	Delanoy et al.	Early Cretaceous (Aptian)		France	A member of the family Douvilleiceratidae.	
Nejdia arabica	Sp. nov	Valid	Gelin	Early Jurassic (Toarcian)	Marrat Formation	Saudi Arabia		
Paracrochordiceras watanabei	Sp. nov	Valid	Ehiro	Middle Triassic (Anisian)	Fukkoshi Formation	Japan	A member of the family Acrochordiceratidae.	
Paradanubites ozashiense	Sp. nov	Valid	Ehiro	Middle Triassic (Anisian)	Fukkoshi Formation	Japan	A member of Danubitoidea belonging to the family Danubitidae.	
Parahedenstroemia? tatjanae	Sp. nov	Valid	Đaković, Krystyn & Sudar	Early Triassic		Montenegro; Russia?	A member of the family Hedenstroemiidae.	
Parapopanoceras involutum	Sp. nov	Valid	Ehiro	Middle Triassic (Anisian)	Fukkoshi Formation	Japan	A member of Ceratitida belonging to the group Megaphyllitoidea and the family Parapopanoceratidae.	
Paucitornoceras	Gen. et comb. nov	Valid	Korn & Bockwinkel	Devonian	Red Ironstone Formation	Germany; United States (New York)	A member of the family Tornoceratidae. The type species is "Goniatites" paucistriatus d`Archiac & de Verneuil (1842); genus also includes "Tornoceras" rhysum Clarke (1898).	
Ponticeras materni	Sp. nov	Valid	Korn & Bockwinkel	Devonian (Givetian)	Red Ironstone Formation	Germany	A member of Agoniatitida belonging to the group Gephuroceratina and the family Ponticeratidae.	
Procheloniceras yajimai	Sp. nov	In press	Matsukawa	Early Cretaceous		Japan		
Pseudocrioceras mazierei	Sp. nov	Valid	Frau & Delanoy	Early Cretaceous (Barremian/Aptian transition)		France		
Pseudoleymeriella obatai	Sp. nov	Valid	Matsukawa & Oji	Early Cretaceous (Aptian)	Miyako Group	Japan	A member of Ancyloceratina belonging to the family Trochleiceratidae.	
Pseudosaynella pacifica	Sp. nov	In press	Matsukawa	Early Cretaceous		Japan		
Psilokhvalynites	Gen. et sp. nov	Valid	Ehiro	Middle Triassic (Anisian)	Fukkoshi Formation	Japan	A member of Dinaritoidea belonging to the family Khvalynitidae. The type species is P. takaizumii.	
Shasticrioceras nakazawai	Sp. nov	In press	Matsukawa	Early Cretaceous		Japan		
Sigaloceras (Gulielmina) fabricius	Sp. nov	Valid	Mönnig & Dietl	Middle Jurassic (Callovian)		Germany		
Tornoceras incisum	Sp. nov	Valid	Söte & Becker	Devonian (Frasnian)	Büdesheim Formation	Germany	A member of the family Tornoceratidae. Announced in 2022; the final article version was published in 2023.	
Tornoceras ventrovaricatum	Sp. nov	Valid	Söte & Becker	Devonian (Frasnian)	Büdesheim Formation	Germany	A member of the family Tornoceratidae. Announced in 2022; the final article version was published in 2023.	
Witchellia companyi	Sp. nov	Valid	Sandoval	Middle Jurassic (Bajocian)		Spain	A member of the family Sonniniidae.	
Witchellia striata	Sp. nov	Valid	Sandoval	Middle Jurassic (Bajocian)		Spain	A member of the family Sonniniidae.	

=== Ammonite research ===
- Mironenko & Naugolnykh (2022) describe a collection of cephalopod jaws from the Permian (Artinskian) Divjinskian Formation (Sverdlovsk Oblast, Russia), interpreted as likely fossil material of goniatitid ammonites belonging to the genus Uraloceras, and infer from the anatomy of the studied jaws that representatives of the genus Uraloceras were likely active predators.
- A study on the morphological change through ontogeny of beyrichitine ammonites from the Anisian of Nevada is published by Bischof, Schlüter & Lehmann (2022).
- A study aiming to determine whether the environmental changes around the Triassic–Jurassic boundary influenced development of septal thickness in ammonites, as well aiming to determine the relation between septal thickness and paleolatitudinal occurrences, and whether ontogenetic septal thickness-trajectories reflected paleogeographic origin or phylogenetic relationships of ammonites, is published by Weber et al. (2022).
- A study on the hydrodynamic properties of shells of Late Triassic and Early Jurassic ammonites is published by Hebdon et al. (2022).
- A study on the functional morphology of ammonites from the Middle Triassic to the Early Jurassic, reevaluating possible causes of an overall shift of ammonite shell forms during the studied periods, is published by Hebdon et al. (2022), who interpret their findings as indicating that the trade-offs between coasting efficiency, volume accretion per unit surface area accreted and diameter accretion per unit of surface area (three factors proposed as explanations of the shift of shell forms) were identical in the Triassic and in the Jurassic.
- Jaws of ammonites belonging to the Boreal family Polyptychitidae, with lower jaws closely resembling jaws of craspeditids, cardioceratids and hoplitoids, are described for the first time from the Valanginian of Russia by Mironenko & Mitta (2022).
- A study on changes of septal spacing between succeeding chambers of the shell of Gaudryceras tenuiliratum during its ontogeny is published by Kawakami, Uchiyama & Wani (2022).
- A study on the impact of the conch shape on ammonite locomotion, based on data obtained from tests of 3D-printed, biomimetic robots representing the oxycone morphology (based on Sphenodiscus lobatus and S. lenticularis), the serpenticone morphology (based on Dactylioceras commune), the sphaerocone morphology (based on Goniatites crenistria) and the morphospace center, is published by Peterman & Ritterbush (2022).

== Other cephalopods ==
=== New taxa ===
Name	Novelty	Status	Authors	Age	Type locality	Location	Notes	Images
Aphelaeceras azzelmattiense	Sp. nov	Valid	Korn & Bockwinkel	Carboniferous (Tournaisian–Viséan boundary interval)		Algeria	A member of the family Trigonoceratidae.	
Arctoteuthis angusta	Sp. nov	Valid	Efremenko	Early Cretaceous		Russia	A belemnite belonging to the family Cylindroteuthididae.	
Binoleniceras	Gen. et sp. nov	Valid	Afhüppe & Becker	Devonian (Givetian)	Hagen-Balve Formation	Germany	A member of Discosorida belonging to the family Entimoceratidae. The type species is B. stichlingi.	
Boreioteuthis mirifica	Sp. nov	Valid	Efremenko	Early Cretaceous		Russia	A belemnite belonging to the family Cylindroteuthididae.	
Chisiloceras maocaopuense	Sp. nov	Valid	Fang in Fang et al.	Ordovician (Darriwilian)		China	A member of the family Endoceratidae.	
Domatoceras tuckeri	Sp. nov	Valid	Niko, Mapes & Seuss	Carboniferous (late Pennsylvanian)	Graham Formation	United States (Texas)	A member of the family Grypoceratidae.	
Endolobus sturgeoni	Sp. nov	Valid	Niko, Mapes & Seuss	Carboniferous (late Pennsylvanian)	Graham Formation	United States (Texas)	A member of the family Koninckioceratidae.	
Enoploceras rieberi	Sp. nov	Valid	Pieroni	Middle Triassic (Anisian)	Besano Formation	Switzerland		
Eximioceras	Gen. et sp. nov	Valid	Shchedukhin	Early Permian		Russia (Bashkortostan)	A member of the family Rhiphaeoceratidae. The type species is E. venustum.	
Holmiceras havelense	Sp. nov	Valid	Aubrechtová & Korn	Ordovician (Darriwilian)	Upper Red Orthoceratite Limestone	Germany		
Kotoceras minosiphonatum	Sp. nov	Valid	Fang in Fang et al.	Ordovician (Darriwilian)		China	A member of the family Endoceratidae.	
Lispoceras orbis	Sp. nov	Valid	Korn, Miao & Bockwinkel	Early Carboniferous		Algeria	A member of the family Trigonoceratidae.	
Lituites baculus	Sp. nov	Valid	Aubrechtová & Korn	Middle Ordovician		Sweden		
Lituites bottkei	Sp. nov	Valid	Aubrechtová & Korn	Middle Ordovician		Poland; Sweden		
Lituites clavis	Sp. nov	Valid	Aubrechtová & Korn	Ordovician (Darriwilian)	Upper Grey Orthoceratite Limestone	Germany		
Lituites dewitzi	Sp. nov	Valid	Aubrechtová & Korn	Ordovician (Darriwilian)	Upper Grey Orthoceratite Limestone	Germany		
Lituites kruegeri	Sp. nov	Valid	Aubrechtová & Korn	Ordovician (Darriwilian)	Upper Grey Orthoceratite Limestone	Germany		
Lituites nebeni	Sp. nov	Valid	Aubrechtová & Korn	Ordovician (Darriwilian)	Upper Grey Orthoceratite Limestone	Germany		
Maccoyoceras concavum	Sp. nov	Valid	Korn & Bockwinkel	Carboniferous (Tournaisian–Viséan boundary interval)		Algeria	A member of the family Trigonoceratidae.	
Maccoyoceras habadraense	Sp. nov	Valid	Korn & Bockwinkel	Carboniferous (Tournaisian)		Algeria	A member of the family Trigonoceratidae.	
Maccoyoceras pentagonum	Sp. nov	Valid	Korn, Miao & Bockwinkel	Early Carboniferous		Algeria	A member of the family Trigonoceratidae.	
Maccoyoceras saharensis	Sp. nov	Valid	Korn & Bockwinkel	Carboniferous (Tournaisian)		Algeria	A member of the family Trigonoceratidae.	
Metacoceras quadratum	Sp. nov	Valid	Niko, Mapes & Seuss	Carboniferous (late Pennsylvanian)	Graham Formation	United States (Texas)	A member of the family Tainoceratidae.	
Michelinoceras minutum	Sp. nov	Valid	Fang in Fang et al.	Ordovician (Darriwilian and Sandbian)		China		
Michelinoceras multiseptum	Sp. nov	Valid	Fang in Fang et al.	Ordovician (Darriwilian)		China		
Pararhiphaeoceras parvum	Sp. nov	Valid	Shchedukhin	Early Permian		Russia (Bashkortostan)	A member of the family Rhiphaeoceratidae.	
Planetoceras destrictum	Sp. nov	Valid	Korn, Miao & Bockwinkel	Early Carboniferous		Algeria	A member of the family Trigonoceratidae.	
Planetoceras transforme	Sp. nov	Valid	Korn, Miao & Bockwinkel	Early Carboniferous		Algeria	A member of the family Trigonoceratidae.	
Pleuronautilus chisatoi	Sp. nov	Valid	Ehiro	Permian (Wordian)	Takakurayama Formation	Japan	A member of the family Tainoceratidae.	
Proterovaginoceras rapidum	Sp. nov	Valid	Fang in Fang et al.	Ordovician (Darriwilian)		China	A member of the family Endoceratidae.	
Rhynchorthoceras kranepuhlense	Sp. nov	Valid	Aubrechtová & Korn	Ordovician (Darriwilian)	Upper Red Orthoceratite Limestone	Germany; Poland		
Rhynchorthoceras rugium	Sp. nov	Valid	Aubrechtová & Korn	Ordovician (Darriwilian)	Upper Red Orthoceratite Limestone	Germany		
Rineceras multituberculatum	Sp. nov	Valid	Korn, Miao & Bockwinkel	Early Carboniferous		Algeria	A member of the family Trigonoceratidae.	
Rineceras rectangulatum	Sp. nov	Valid	Korn, Miao & Bockwinkel	Early Carboniferous		Algeria	A member of the family Trigonoceratidae.	
Rineceras tenerum	Sp. nov	Valid	Korn & Bockwinkel	Carboniferous (Tournaisian)		Algeria	A member of the family Trigonoceratidae.	
Solenochilus jackense	Sp. nov	Valid	Niko, Mapes & Seuss	Carboniferous (late Pennsylvanian)	Graham Formation	United States (Texas)	A member of the family Solenochilidae.	
Stroboceras ancilis	Sp. nov	Valid	Korn & Bockwinkel	Carboniferous (Viséan)		Algeria	A member of the family Trigonoceratidae.	
Stroboceras mane	Sp. nov	Valid	Korn & Bockwinkel	Carboniferous (Tournaisian)		Algeria	A member of the family Trigonoceratidae.	
Stroborineceras	Gen. et 2 sp. nov	Valid	Korn & Bockwinkel	Carboniferous (Tournaisian)		Algeria	A member of the family Trigonoceratidae. The type species is S. insalahensis; genus also includes new species S. felis and possibly also "Nautilus (Trematodiscus)" meekianus Winchell (1862) and "Nautilus (Trematodiscus)" strigatus Winchell (1862).	
Syllipsimopodi	Gen. et sp. nov	Disputed	Whalen & Landman	Carboniferous (Serpukhovian)	Bear Gulch Limestone	United States (Montana)	A member of Coleoidea of uncertain affinities. Originally assigned to the clade Vampyropoda; Klug et al. (2023) considered it to be a probable junior synonym of Gordoniconus beargulchensis. The type species is S. bideni, named for Joe Biden.	
Thrincoceras devolvere	Sp. nov	Valid	Korn, Miao & Bockwinkel	Early Carboniferous		Algeria	A member of the family Trigonoceratidae.	
Tohokubelus	Gen. et sp. nov	Valid	Niko & Ehiro	Early Triassic (Olenekian)	Osawa Formation	Japan	A sinobelemnitid belemnite. Genus includes new species T. takaizumii.	
Trilacinoceras filix	Sp. nov	Valid	Aubrechtová & Korn	Ordovician (Darriwilian)	Upper Grey Orthoceratite Limestone	Germany	A member of the family Lituitidae.	
Trilacinoceras knoefleri	Sp. nov	Valid	Aubrechtová & Korn	Ordovician (Darriwilian)	Upper Grey Orthoceratite Limestone	Germany	A member of the family Lituitidae.	
Trilobitoceras	Gen. et sp. et comb. nov	Valid	Korn & Bockwinkel	Carboniferous		Algeria; United States (Michigan)	A member of the family Trigonoceratidae. The type species is T. peculiaris; genus also includes "Nautilus (Trematodiscus)" planidorsalis Winchell (1862).	
Vestinautilus angulatus	Sp. nov	Valid	Korn & Bockwinkel	Carboniferous (Tournaisian)		Algeria	A member of the family Trigonoceratidae.	
Vestinautilus bicristatus	Sp. nov	Valid	Korn & Bockwinkel	Carboniferous (Tournaisian)		Algeria	A member of the family Trigonoceratidae.	
Vestinautilus concinnus	Sp. nov	Valid	Korn, Miao & Bockwinkel	Early Carboniferous		Algeria	A member of the family Trigonoceratidae.	
Vestinautilus inflexus	Sp. nov	Valid	Korn & Bockwinkel	Carboniferous (Tournaisian)		Algeria	A member of the family Trigonoceratidae.	
Vestinautilus padus	Sp. nov	Valid	Korn, Miao & Bockwinkel	Early Carboniferous		Algeria	A member of the family Trigonoceratidae.	
Vestinautilus papilio	Sp. nov	Valid	Korn & Bockwinkel	Carboniferous (Tournaisian)		Algeria	A member of the family Trigonoceratidae.	
Xainzanoceras densum	Sp. nov	Valid	Fang in Fang et al.	Ordovician (Katian)	Pagoda Formation	China	Possibly a member of the family Diestoceratidae.	

=== Other cephalopod research ===
- A study on the phylogenetic relationships of Cambrian and Ordovician cephalopods is published by Pohle et al. (2022).
- Putative tentaculitoid Iwakiella ichiroi is reinterpreted as a sphaerorthoceratid orthocerid cephalopod by Niko (2022).
- A study on the identity of enigmatic black amorphous fossils often associated with belemnoid remains, based on the analysis of fossil material from the Upper Triassic (Carnian) Polzberg Lagerstätte (Austria), is published by Lukeneder & Lukeneder (2022), who interpret the enigmatic fossils as likely representing the preservation of a mineralized and secondarily carbonized cephalic-ocular-arm-cartilage complex of the belemnoid Phragmoteuthis bisinuata.
- A study on structures interpreted by Eduard Suess as beaks of Phragmoteuthis bisinuata is published by Doguzhaeva et al. (2022), who reinterpret the studied structures as cartilaginous remains of a prey, presumably juvenile fish; the authors also report a gladius of a previously unknown Carnian teuthid from the Cave del Predil (Italy), possibly similar to the Permian taxon Glochinomorpha stifeli, as well as an upper beak of a coleoid from the Anisian Buchenstein Formation (Italy), demonstrating typical coleoid upper beak morphology and composition, and interpreted by the authors as likely indicative of similar upper beak structure in P. bisinuata. Their interpretation of purported beaks of P. bisinuata as remains of a prey is subsequently contested by Lukeneder & Lukeneder (2022).
- Belemnite species Liobelus acrei, otherwise known from the latest Jurassic and Early Cretaceous of the Boreal Realm, is reported from the Valanginian of the Vocontian Basin (France) by Mutterlose, Picollier & Dzyuba (2022), who interpret this finding as evidence of an isolated immigration of belemnites from the north in the early Valanginian, and establish two taxonomically different faunas of Tethyan belemnites.
- A study on the age of belemnites from the lower Santonian "Sponge horizon" of the Mozhzhelloovrazhnaya Formation in the Lower Volga region between Saratov and Volgograd (Russia), some of which are interpreted as redeposited from middle and upper Coniacian deposits on the basis of strontium, carbon and oxygen isotope data (with the first representatives of the genus Belemnitella interpreted as late Coniacian in age), is published by Zakharov et al. (2022).
- Revision of the type specimens of Eothinoceras americanum is published by Evans & Cichowolski (2022), who restrict the genus Eothinoceras to the type species, and propose a new scheme for classification of the genera belonging to the order Cyrtocerinida.
- A study on the distribution of nautiloids throughout the Cenozoic is published by Kiel, Goedert & Tsai (2022), who interpret their findings as indicating that from the Oligocene onward nautiloids became extinct in areas where pinnipeds appeared, while cetaceans (with possible exception of simocetids and agorophiids) were not found to significantly affect the demise of nautiloids.
- Fossil material of "Kummelonautilus" taiwanum is described from the Miocene Houdongkeng Formation (Taiwan) by Goedert, Kiel & Tsai (2022), who provisionally transfer this species to the genus Nautilus, and review the fossil record of the genus Nautilus in the Indo-Pacific region.
- A study on the external and internal morphology, affinities and ecology of Vampyronassa rhodanica, based on data on soft tissue of specimens from the La Voulte-sur-Rhône (France), is published by Rowe et al. (2022).
- First cephalopod statoliths from the Lower Cretaceous of Poland and United Kingdom are described by Pindakiewicz et al. (2022), who compare Mesozoic statoliths to those of extant cephalopods, and find the closest resemblance between Mesozoic forms and statoliths of extant idiosepiids.
- A study on the fossil material of Belosaepia from the Egemkapel Clay Member of the Tielt Formation and the Roubaix Clay Member of the Kortrijk Formation (Belgium), applying micro-CT imaging to the studied fossils, is published by Goolaerts et al. (2022), who identify growth lines in the studied fossils, and interpret their findings as indicating that the studied material belongs to representatives of a single species (B. tricarinata).

== Bivalves ==
=== New taxa ===
Name	Novelty	Status	Authors	Age	Type locality	Location	Notes	Images
Acila (Truncacila) interferencia	Sp. nov	Valid	Kiel et al.	Miocene	Amlang Formation	Philippines	A species of Acila.	
Anniedhondtella	Gen. et sp. nov	Valid	Jagt, Cooper & Jagt-Yazykova	Late Cretaceous (Maastrichtian)	Maastricht Formation		A member of Trigoniida belonging to the family Rutitrigoniidae. Genus includes new species A. rieui.	
Aphanaia sobopolensis	Sp. nov	Valid	Biakov & Kutygin	Early Permian		Russia (Sakha)		
Arcopagia esteponensis	Sp. nov	Valid	Brunetti & Della Bella	Pliocene		Spain	A member of the family Tellinidae.	
Arcopagia ligustica	Sp. nov	Valid	Brunetti & Della Bella	Early Pliocene		Italy	A member of the family Tellinidae.	
Arcopella crestii	Sp. nov	Valid	Brunetti & Della Bella	Late Pliocene		Italy	A member of the family Tellinidae.	
Arcopella pseudomista	Sp. nov	Valid	Brunetti & Della Bella	Early Pliocene		Italy	A member of the family Tellinidae.	
Bathymodiolus labayugensis	Sp. nov	Valid	Kiel et al.	Miocene	Amlang Formation	Philippines	A species of Bathymodiolus.	
Choniocardia olivieri	Nom. nov	Valid	Pacaud	Eocene		France	A member of the family Carditidae; a replacement name for Cardita (Miodon) bezanconi Cossmann (1887).	
Conchocele pangasinanensis	Sp. nov	Valid	Kiel et al.	Miocene	Amlang Formation	Philippines	A member of the family Thyasiridae.	
Crassatella (Bathytormus) ignava	Sp. nov	Valid	Berezovsky	Eocene	Malinovskaya Formation	Ukraine	A member of the family Crassatellidae.	
Crassatella lassa	Sp. nov	Valid	Berezovsky	Late Eocene		Ukraine		
Crassostrea sophiae	Nom. nov	Valid	Pacaud	Eocene		France	A species of Crassostrea; a replacement name for Ostrea elegans Deshayes (1832).	
Cyclotellina hugoi	Nom. nov	Valid	Pacaud	Eocene		France	A member of the family Tellinidae; a replacement name for Tellina (Cyclotellina) bezanconi Cossmann (1906).	
Gryphaea (Gryphaea) lavernockensis	Sp. nov	Valid	Hodges	Early Jurassic		United Kingdom		
Kasimlara ? antiqua	Sp. nov	Valid	Fang & Carter	Permian		Russia	A member of the family Kalenteridae belonging to the subfamily Healeyinae.	
Liaoningoconcha	Nom. nov		Fang & Carter	Late Triassic	Yangcaogou Formation	China	A member of Cardiida belonging to the family Ferganoconchidae; a replacement name for Liaoningia Yu & Dong (1993). Ceccolini & Cianferoni (2021) proposed a replacement name Sinoliaoningia for the same genus in an earlier publication.	
Megaxinus gorrospei	Sp. nov	Valid	Kiel et al.	Miocene	Amlang Formation	Philippines	A member of the family Lucinidae.	
Meleagrinella golberti	Sp. nov	Valid	Lutikov & Arp	Early Jurassic (Toarcian)		Canada; Germany; Russia; United Kingdom	A member of the family Oxytomidae. Published online in 2023, but the issue date is listed as December 2022.	
Meleagrinella prima	Sp. nov	Valid	Lutikov in Lutikov & Arp	Early Jurassic (Toarcian)		Russia	A member of the family Oxytomidae. Published online in 2023, but the issue date is listed as December 2022.	
Monginaia	Gen. et comb. nov	In press	Delvene et al.	Early Cretaceous (Barremian)	Camarillas Formation	Spain	A member of Unionida belonging to the new family Monginaiidae. Genus includes "Elliptio" galvensis Mongin (1966).	
Myonia komiensiformis	Sp. nov	Valid	Biakov	Permian		Russia	A member of Pholadomyida belonging to the family Sanguinolitidae.	
Myonia kutygini	Sp. nov	Valid	Biakov	Permian		Russia	A member of Pholadomyida belonging to the family Sanguinolitidae.	
Oudardia pliorecens	Sp. nov	Valid	Brunetti & Della Bella	Plio-Pleistocene		Italy	A member of the family Tellinidae.	
Palaeomutela (Palaeanodonta) berrutii	Sp. nov	Valid	Silantiev et al.	Permian (Kungurian)	Collio Formation	Italy	A member of Actinodontida belonging to the family Palaeomutelidae.	
Palaeomutela (Palaeanodonta) guncinaensis	Sp. nov	Valid	Silantiev et al.	Permian (Kungurian)	Guncina Formation	Italy	A member of Actinodontida belonging to the family Palaeomutelidae.	
Peronidia iberica	Sp. nov	Valid	Brunetti & Della Bella	Early Pliocene		Spain	A member of the family Tellinidae.	
Peronidia intermedia	Sp. nov	Valid	Brunetti & Della Bella	Early Pliocene		Italy	A member of the family Tellinidae.	
Pliocardia ballesterosi	Sp. nov	Valid	Kiel et al.	Miocene	Amlang Formation	Philippines	A species of Pliocardia.	
Praebarrettia magnifica	Sp. nov		Mitchell	Late Cretaceous (Campanian)	Dry Hill Formation	Jamaica	A rudist bivalve.	
Psammotreta santacatalinae	Sp. nov	Valid	Brunetti & Della Bella	Early Pliocene		Spain	A member of the family Tellinidae.	
Sisonia	Gen. et sp. nov	Valid	Kiel et al.	Miocene	Amlang Formation	Philippines	A bivalve of uncertain affinities. The type species is S. frijellanae.	
Squiresica	Gen. et comb. nov	Valid	Hybertsen, Goedert & Kiel	Oligocene	Lincoln Creek Formation	United States (Alaska; Washington)	A member of the family Vesicomyidae. The type species is "Archivesica" knapptonensis Amano & Kiel (2007); genus also includes "Archivesica" marincovichi Kiel & Amano (2010).	
Verneuilnodon	Gen. et comb. nov	Valid	Fang & Carter	Permian		Russia	A member of the family Kalenteridae belonging to the subfamily Healeyinae; a new genus for "Mytilus (Modiola)" pallasi de Verneuil (1845).	
Whitfieldiella catherinei	Sp. nov		Mitchell	Late Cretaceous (Campanian)	Dry Hill Formation	Jamaica	A rudist bivalve.	
Whitfieldiella gracilis	Sp. nov		Mitchell	Late Cretaceous (Campanian)	Dry Hill Formation	Jamaica	A rudist bivalve.	
Wolfgangella	Gen. et 2 sp. nov	Valid	Jagt, Cooper & Jagt-Yazykova	Late Cretaceous (Maastrichtian)	Maastricht Formation		A member of Trigoniida belonging to the family Rutitrigoniidae. Genus includes new species W. neilpearti and W. ignota.	

=== Bivalve research ===
- Late Triassic bivalves are identified for the first time in olistostromes from the Sêwa Formation in the Riganpeicuo area (Tibet, China) by Xiao et al. (2022).
- A study on the impact of the Triassic–Jurassic extinction event on the body-size distribution of bivalves, based on data from three study sites in the United Kingdom, is published by Opazo & Twitchett (2022).
- Wolkenstein (2022) presents evidence of abundance and diversity in the color patterns of Pleuronectites laevigatus from the Middle Triassic Muschelkalk of Central Europe.
- Asato, Nakayama & Imai (2022) study color patterns of freshwater bivalves from the Lower Cretaceous Kitadani Formation (Japan), providing evidence of the presence of similar shell color patterns in extant and Early Cretaceous bivalves.

== Gastropods ==
=== New taxa ===
Name	Novelty	Status	Authors	Age	Type locality	Location	Notes	Images
Akburunella laminaris	Sp. nov	Valid	Guzhov	Miocene		Russia	Published online in 2023, but the issue date is listed as December 2022.	
Akburunella nefanda archaica	Ssp. nov	Valid	Guzhov	Miocene		Russia	Published online in 2023, but the issue date is listed as December 2022.	
Akburunella sinuosa	Sp. nov	Valid	Guzhov	Miocene		Russia	Published online in 2023, but the issue date is listed as December 2022.	
Akburunella spinosa	Sp. nov	Valid	Guzhov	Miocene		Russia	Published online in 2023, but the issue date is listed as December 2022.	
Ampezzopleura barremica	Sp. nov	Valid	Isaji, Haga & Kashiwagi	Early Cretaceous (Barremian)	Kimigahama Formation	Japan		
Angularia corallina	Sp. nov	Valid	Nützel et al.	Late Triassic (Rhaetian)	Oberrhät Formation	Austria	A member of Caenogastropoda belonging to the family Purpurinidae. Originally described as a species of Angularia, but subsequently transferred to the genus Angulariopsis.	
Angulomphalus senowbarii	Sp. nov	Valid	Nützel et al.	Late Triassic (Rhaetian)	Oberrhät Formation	Austria	A member of Vetigastropoda belonging to the family Ptychomphalidae.	
Anisocycla subcylindrica	Sp. nov	Valid	Pavia et al.	Pliocene		Italy	A member of the family Murchisonellidae.	
Antiphora aurora	Sp. nov	Valid	Isaji, Haga & Kashiwagi	Early Cretaceous (Barremian)	Kimigahama Formation	Japan		
Aplexa canculae	Sp. nov	Valid	Pacaud	Paleocene (Thanetian)		France	A species of Aplexa.	
Aplexa cotiensis	Nom. nov	Valid	Pacaud	Eocene		France	A species of Aplexa; a replacement name for Physa (Aplecta) brevispirata Cossmann & Pissarro (1913).	
Aplexa iota	Sp. nov	Valid	Pacaud	Paleogene		France	A species of Aplexa.	
Aplexa oryza	Sp. nov	Valid	Pacaud	Paleogene		France	A species of Aplexa.	
Aplexa risleius	Sp. nov	Valid	Pacaud	Paleocene (Thanetian)		France	A species of Aplexa.	
Aplexa zhui	Nom. nov	Valid	Pacaud	Early Cretaceous (Albian)	Dalazi Formation	China	A species of Aplexa; a replacement name for Physa fusiformis Zhu (1980).	
Arachnotropis	Gen. et comb. nov	Valid	Pérez, Ferrari & Ezcurra	Paleocene–Eocene		Antarctica; Australia	A member of the family Eucyclidae. The type species is "Calliotropis" microglyptophorus Darragh (1997); genus also includes "Calliotropis" antarchais Stilwell (2005).	
Archaeocyclotus brevivillosus	Sp. nov	In press	Bichain et al.	Cretaceous	Burmese amber	Myanmar	A member of the family Cyclophoridae.	
Archaeostylus	Gen. et sp. nov	Valid	Brook & Hayward	Pliocene (Waipipian)	Kaawa Formation	New Zealand	A member of the family Bothriembryontidae belonging to the subfamily Placostylinae. The type species is A. manukauensis.	
Astralium ena	Sp. nov	Valid	Tomida, Inoue & Kase	Miocene	Ena Limestone	Japan	A species of Astralium.	
Austrocypraea jimgracei	Sp. nov	Valid	Southgate & Roberts	Pliocene		Australia	A member of the family Cypraeidae.	
Barycypraea iungo	Sp. nov	Valid	Seccombe & Aiken	Pleistocene		South Africa	A species of Barycypraea.	
Bathrotomaria teodorii	Sp. nov	Valid	Chaix in Chaix & Plicot	Late Cretaceous (Santonian)		France	A member of the family Pleurotomariidae.	
Baylea tenera	Sp. nov	Valid	Karapunar et al.	Carboniferous (Pennsylvanian)	Boggy Formation	United States (Oklahoma)	A member of the family Eotomariidae.	
Bittium binodulosum	Sp. nov	Junior homonym	Guzhov	Miocene		Russia (Adygea)	A species of Bittium. Published online in 2023, but the issue date is listed as December 2022. The specific name is preoccupied by Bittium binodulosum Yokoyama (1920); Guzhov in Harzhauser, Guzhov & Landau (2025) coined a replacement name Bittium nabokovorum.	
Brachystomia succineiformis	Sp. nov	Valid	Guzhov	Miocene		Russia	A species of Brachystomia. Published online in 2023, but the issue date is listed as December 2022.	
Ceritella convexa	Sp. nov	Valid	Gründel et al.	Late Jurassic (Kimmeridgian)		Germany	A member of the family Ceritellidae.	
Choshipleura	Gen. et sp. nov	Valid	Isaji, Haga & Kashiwagi	Early Cretaceous (Barremian)	Kimigahama Formation	Japan	Genus includes new species C. striata.	
Clathromangelia acuticostata	Sp. nov	Valid	Landau, Harzhauser & Giannuzzi-Savelli	Pliocene (Piacenzian)		Spain	A species of Clathromangelia.	
Clathromangelia mulderi	Sp. nov	Valid	Landau, Harzhauser & Giannuzzi-Savelli	Pliocene (Piacenzian)		Spain	A species of Clathromangelia.	
Clathromangelia oliverioi	Sp. nov	Valid	Landau, Harzhauser & Giannuzzi-Savelli	Pliocene (Piacenzian)		Spain	A species of Clathromangelia.	
"Clavatula" ariejansseni	Sp. nov	Valid	Harzhauser, Landau & Janssen	Miocene (Serravallian)	Týrtar Formation	Turkey	A member of the family Clavatulidae.	
"Clavatula" atatuerki	Sp. nov	Valid	Harzhauser, Landau & Janssen	Miocene (Serravallian)	Týrtar Formation	Turkey	A member of the family Clavatulidae.	
"Clavatula" iberica	Sp. nov	Valid	Landau & Harzhauser	Pliocene (Piacenzian)		Spain	A member of the family Clavatulidae.	
"Clavatula" irisae	Sp. nov	Valid	Harzhauser, Landau & Janssen	Miocene (Langhian)	Baden Formation	Austria; Slovenia	A member of the family Clavatulidae.	
"Clavatula" jarzynkae	Nom. nov	Valid	Harzhauser, Landau & Janssen	Miocene (Langhian)	Grund Formation	Austria; Poland	A member of the family Clavatulidae; a replacement name for Clavatula auingeri Finlay (1927).	
"Clavatula" nana	Sp. nov	Valid	Landau & Harzhauser	Pliocene (Piacenzian)		Spain	A member of the family Clavatulidae.	
"Clavatula" pliogradata	Sp. nov	Valid	Landau & Harzhauser	Pliocene (Piacenzian)		Spain	A member of the family Clavatulidae.	
Clavatula sorini	Sp. nov	Valid	Harzhauser, Landau & Janssen	Miocene (Langhian)	Dej Formation	Italy? Romania	A species of Clavatula.	
Clithon cooncreekense	Sp. nov	Valid	Garvie & Symonds	Late Cretaceous (Maastrichtian)	Coon Creek Formation	United States (Tennessee)	A species of Clithon.	
Clithon duomillias	Sp. nov	Valid	Garvie & Symonds	Eocene	Cook Mountain Formation	United States (Texas)	A species of Clithon.	
Clithon lisae	Sp. nov	Valid	Garvie & Symonds	Eocene	Cook Mountain Formation	United States (Texas)	A species of Clithon.	
Clithon traceyi	Sp. nov	Valid	Garvie & Symonds	Eocene	Cook Mountain Formation	United States (Texas)	A species of Clithon.	
Columbellaria rara	Sp. nov	Valid	Gründel, Hostettler & Menkveld-Gfeller	Late Jurassic (Oxfordian)	St-Ursanne Formation	Switzerland	A member of the family Colombellinidae. Subsequently transferred to the genus Zittelia.	
Conotomaria lecatae	Sp. nov	Valid	Chaix & Grenier	Late Cretaceous (Campanian)		France	A member of the family Pleurotomariidae.	
Conus damianakisi	Sp. nov	Valid	Psarras, Merle & Koskeridou	Miocene (Tortonian)		Greece	A species of Conus.	
Conus davolii	Sp. nov	Valid	Psarras, Merle & Koskeridou	Miocene (Tortonian)		Greece; Hungary? Italy	A species of Conus.	
Conus dellabellai	Sp. nov	Valid	Pavia et al.	Pliocene		Italy	A species of Conus.	
Conus ictini	Sp. nov	Valid	Psarras, Merle & Koskeridou	Miocene (Serravallian and Tortonian)		Greece; Turkey	A species of Conus.	
Conus lauriatragei	Sp. nov	Valid	Psarras, Merle & Koskeridou	Miocene (Langhian to Tortonian)		Greece; Hungary	A species of Conus.	
Conus moissettei	Sp. nov	Valid	Psarras, Merle & Koskeridou	Miocene (Tortonian)		Greece	A species of Conus.	
Conus villalvernensis	Sp. nov	Valid	Pavia et al.	Pliocene		Italy	A species of Conus.	
Coptocheilus kachinensis	Sp. nov		Yu, Zhuo & Páll-Gergely	Cretaceous	Burmese amber	Myanmar	A species of Coptocheilus.	
Cornirostra anistratenkorum umbilicaris	Ssp. nov	Valid	Guzhov	Miocene		Russia	Published online in 2023, but the issue date is listed as December 2022.	
Crepidula bellardii	Sp. nov	Valid	Pavia et al.	Pliocene		Italy	A species of Crepidula.	
Cretadiostoma	Gen. et 2 sp. nov		Yu, Zhuo & Páll-Gergely	Cretaceous	Burmese amber	Myanmar	A member of the family Pupinidae. Genus includes new species C. caperatum and C. umbilicarinatum.	
Cryptoptyxis? fortiter	Sp. nov	Valid	Gründel, Hostettler & Menkveld-Gfeller	Late Jurassic (Oxfordian)	St-Ursanne Formation	Switzerland	A member of the family Maoraxidae.	
Cyrillia clathrataeformis	Sp. nov	Valid	Landau, Harzhauser & Giannuzzi-Savelli	Pliocene (Piacenzian)		Spain	A species of Cyrillia.	
Cyrillia saldubensis	Sp. nov	Valid	Landau, Harzhauser & Giannuzzi-Savelli	Pliocene (Piacenzian)		Spain	A species of Cyrillia.	
Dentitriangularum	Gen. et sp. nov	Valid	Chaix in Chaix & Plicot	Late Cretaceous (Santonian)		France	A member of the family Cypraeidae. The type species is D. pacaudi.	
Diaugasma mediterranea	Sp. nov	Valid	Landau, Harzhauser & Giannuzzi-Savelli	Pliocene (Piacenzian)		Spain	A species of Diaugasma.	
Dictyotomaria turrisbabel	Sp. nov	Valid	Karapunar et al.	Carboniferous (Pennsylvanian)	Caddo Creek Formation	United States (Texas)	A member of the family Phymatopleuridae.	
Diempterus? multicostatus	Sp. nov	Valid	Gründel, Hostettler & Menkveld-Gfeller	Late Jurassic (Oxfordian)	St-Ursanne Formation	Switzerland	A member of the family Aporrhaidae.	
Edrozeba	Gen. et 4 sp. et comb. nov	Valid	Guzhov	Miocene		Russia	A member of the family Hydrobiidae. The type species is E. caeca; genus also includes new species E. angulata, E. minuta and E. striata, as well as "Hydrobia" enikalensis Kolesnikov (1935). Published online in 2023, but the issue date is listed as December 2022.	
Eirlysella	Gen. et sp. et comb. nov	Valid	Karapunar et al.	Carboniferous (Pennsylvanian)	Boggy Formation	United States (Oklahoma)	A member of the family Luciellidae. The type species is E. buckhornensis; genus also includes "Trochus" hissingerianus de Koninck (1843), "Pleurotomaria" squamula Phillips (1836) and "Luciellina" ocultabanda Kues & Batten (2001).	
Endoplocus acutus	Sp. nov	Valid	Gründel et al.	Late Jurassic (Kimmeridgian)		Germany	A member of the family Nerineidae.	
Endoplocus inflatus	Sp. nov	Valid	Gründel et al.	Late Jurassic (Kimmeridgian)		Germany	A member of the family Nerineidae.	
Ericusa ngayawang	Sp. nov	Valid	Yates	Miocene (Langhian)	Cadell Formation	Australia	A species of Ericusa.	
Exelissa ursannella	Sp. nov	Valid	Gründel, Hostettler & Menkveld-Gfeller	Late Jurassic (Oxfordian)	St-Ursanne Formation	Switzerland	A member of Cerithioidea belonging to the family Cryptaulacidae.	
Faureicerithium	Gen. et sp. nov	Valid	Chaix in Chaix & Plicot	Late Cretaceous (Santonian)		France	A member of the family Campanilidae. The type species is F. bidentata.	
Favartia plioelata	Sp. nov	Valid	Brunetti & Della Bella	Pliocene		Italy	A species of Favartia.	
Granulatocincta	Gen. et comb. et 3 sp. nov	Valid	Harzhauser, Landau & Janssen	Miocene and Pliocene		Austria; Bulgaria; Czech Republic; France; Hungary; Italy; Romania; Slovakia; Spain; Turkey	A member of the family Clavatulidae. The type species is "Pleurotoma" granulato-cincta Münster in Goldfuss (1841); genus also includes new species G. callim, G. theoderichi and G. pelliscrocodili, as well as "Pleurotoma (Clavatula)" angelae Hoernes & Auinger (1891), "Clavatula" contorta Švagrovský (1958), "Pleurotoma (Clavatula)" nataliae Hoernes & Auinger (1891), "Pleurotoma" schreibersi Hörnes (1854), "Clavatula" calcarai Bellardi (1877), "Clavatula" curionii Bellardi (1877), "Clavatula" pellegrinii Simonelli (1896), "Pleurotoma" sotterii Michelotti (1847), "Clavatula" turbinata Bellardi (1877), "Clavatula" turgidula Bellardi (1877), "Clavatula" vigolensis Bellardi (1877), "Clavatula" rugata Bellardi (1877), "Murex" rusticus Brocchi (1814), "Pleurotoma" capgrandi Tournouër (1873), "Pleurotoma" obtruta Millet (1865), "Clavatula" delgadoi Vera-Peláez & Lozano-Francisco (2001) and possibly "Clavatula" boreointerrupta Kautsky (1925).	
Hologyra callosa	Sp. nov	Valid	Nützel et al.	Late Triassic (Rhaetian)	Oberrhät Formation	Austria	A member of the family Neritopsidae.	
Hydrobia neofrauenfeldi	Sp. nov	Valid	Guzhov	Miocene		Russia	A species of Hydrobia. Published online in 2023, but the issue date is listed as December 2022.	
Hydrobia orientalis	Sp. nov	Valid	Zhu	Late Permian	Wutonggou Formation	China	A species of Hydrobia.	
Iberellus colladoi	Sp. nov	Valid	Juárez-Ruiz & Altaba	Pliocene		Spain	A species of Iberellus.	
Itieroptygmatis cylindrata	Sp. nov	Valid	Gründel et al.	Late Jurassic (Kimmeridgian)		Germany	A member of Nerineoidea belonging to the family Itieriidae.	
Jenneria sandrae	Sp. nov	Valid	Daughenbaugh	Pleistocene (Chibanian)	Probably Bermont Formation	United States (Florida)	A species of Jenneria.	
Leufroyia gradata	Sp. nov	Valid	Landau, Harzhauser & Giannuzzi-Savelli	Pliocene (Piacenzian)		Spain	A species of Leufroyia.	
Loriolotrema? nodosa	Sp. nov	Valid	Gründel, Hostettler & Menkveld-Gfeller	Late Jurassic (Oxfordian)	St-Ursanne Formation	Switzerland	A member of the family Brachytrematidae.	
Lyria estotiensis	Sp. nov	Valid	Bail, Ledon & Pacaud	Oligocene (Chattian)		France	A species of Lyria.	
Lyria lozoueti	Sp. nov	Valid	Bail, Ledon & Pacaud	Miocene (Aquitanian)		France	A species of Lyria.	
Maoristylus pliocenicus	Sp. nov	Valid	Brook & Hayward	Pliocene (Waipipian)	Kaawa Formation	New Zealand	A member of the family Bothriembryontidae belonging to the subfamily Placostylinae.	
Megaclavatula	Gen. et 2 sp. et comb. nov	Valid	Harzhauser, Landau & Janssen	Miocene		Austria; Czech Republic; Hungary; Italy? Poland; Romania; Slovakia; Slovenia; Ukraine	A member of the family Clavatulidae. The type species is M. grunerti; genus also includes new species M. pilleri, as well as "Pleurotoma (Clavatula)" amaliae Hoernes & Auinger (1891), "Pleurotoma (Clavatula)" antoniae Hoernes & Auinger (1891), "Pleurotoma (Clavatula)" evae Hoernes & Auinger (1891), "Pleurotoma" laevigatum Eichwald (1830), "Perrona" nemethi Kovács & Vicián (2021), "Pleurotoma" neudorfensis Schaffer (1898), "Pleurotoma tuberculosa" polonica Pusch (1837), "Pleurotoma (Clavatula) asperulata" var. subsculpta Schaffer (1912), "Pleurotoma" ernesti Toula (1901), "Pleurotoma" asperulata Lamarck (1822), Clavatula saubrigiana laurensii Peyrot (1931) and possibly "Pleurotoma (Clavatula)" szontaghi Strausz (1926), "Clavatula" taurofusulata Sacco (1890), "Clavatula" subdepressa Sacco (1890) and "Clavatula" tortonica Peyrot (1931).	
Metacerithium boshuae	Sp. nov	Valid	Isaji, Haga & Kashiwagi	Early Cretaceous (Barremian)	Kimigahama Formation	Japan	A member of the family Metacerithiidae.	
Metalycaeus fossilis	Sp. nov	In press	Yu, Páll-Gergely & Salvador	Miocene	Zhangpu amber	China	A species of Metalycaeus.	
Microandonia	Gen. et sp. nov	Valid	Landau, Harzhauser & Giannuzzi-Savelli	Pliocene (Piacenzian)		Spain	A member of the family Raphitomidae. The type species is M. minutissima.	
Microdrillia plioserratula	Sp. nov	Valid	Landau & Harzhauser	Pliocene		Italy; Spain	A species of Microdrillia.	
Microschiza rhaetica	Sp. nov	Valid	Nützel et al.	Late Triassic (Rhaetian)	Oberrhät Formation	Austria	A member of the family Purpurinidae.	
Mitromorpha (Mitrolumna) velerinensis	Sp. nov	Valid	Landau & Harzhauser	Pliocene		Italy? Spain	A species of Mitromorpha.	
Muricopsis landaui	Sp. nov	Valid	Merle in Merle, Garrigues & Pointier	Miocene		Turkey	A species of Muricopsis.	
Napaeus guanche	Sp. nov	In press	Miller et al.	Middle Pleistocene		Spain (Canary Islands)	A species of Napaeus.	
Napaeus lipauges	Sp. nov	In press	Miller et al.	Middle Pleistocene		Spain (Canary Islands)	A species of Napaeus.	
Narrimania saldubensis	Sp. nov	Valid	Landau & Mulder	Pliocene		Spain		
Neoperrona	Gen. et comb. et sp. nov	Valid	Harzhauser, Landau & Janssen	Miocene (Langhian)		Croatia; Hungary; Italy	A member of the family Clavatulidae. The type species is "Perrona" harzhauseri Kovács & Vicián (2021); genus also includes new species N. zoltanorum, as well as "Clavatula" taurinensis Bellardi (1877).	
Neridomus mccallae	Sp. nov	Valid	Garvie & Symonds	Early Cretaceous (Albian)	Edwards Formation	United States (Texas)	A member of the family Neridomidae.	
Neridomus minutissimus	Sp. nov	Valid	Garvie & Symonds	Early Cretaceous (Albian)	Walnut Formation	United States (Texas)	A member of the family Neridomidae.	
Nerinea donosa	Sp. nov	Valid	Gründel et al.	Late Jurassic (Kimmeridgian)		Germany	A member of the family Nerineidae.	
Neuburgensia	Gen. et comb. nov	Valid	Gründel, Hostettler & Menkveld-Gfeller	Late Jurassic (Oxfordian to Tithonian)		Germany; Switzerland	Possibly a member of Cerithioidea. The type species is "Gymnocerithium" concavum Janicke (1966); genus also includes "Cerithium" amabile Zittel (1873), "Gymnocerithium"? convexoconcavum Gründel, Keupp & Lang (2019), "Cerithium" crenato-cinctum Zittel (1873), "Cerithium" involvens Zittel (1873) and "Cerithium" perrotundum Cossmann (1913).	
Nystia conoidalis	Sp. nov	Valid	Kadolsky & Morton	Oligocene (Rupelian)		United Kingdom	A species of Nystia.	
Odetta chirlii	Sp. nov	Valid	Pavia et al.	Pliocene		Italy	A species of Odetta.	
Odostomia caucasica	Sp. nov	Valid	Guzhov	Miocene		Russia	A species of Odostomia. Published online in 2023, but the issue date is listed as December 2022.	
Oleginina	Gen. et sp. et comb. nov	Valid	Harzhauser, Landau & Janssen in Landau, Harzhauser & Giannuzzi-Savelli	Miocene (Burdigalian to Tortonian)		Austria; Bosnia and Herzegovina; Bulgaria; Croatia; Czech Republic; Italy; Moldova; Poland; Romania; Slovakia; Ukraine	A member of the family Clavatulidae. The type species is O. mandici; genus also includes "Pleurotoma (Clavatula)" agathae Hoernes & Auinger (1891), "Pleurotoma (Clavatula)" brigittae Hoernes & Auinger (1891), "Pleurotoma" doderleini Hörnes (1854), "Pleurotoma (Clavatula)" dorotheae Hoernes & Auinger (1891), "Pleurotoma" rumana Simionescu & Barbu (1940), Clavatula schreibersi szokolyensis Strausz (1960), "Pleurotoma" winterlingensis Quenstedt (1884), "Clavatula" aradasi Bellardi (1877), "Clavatula" baccifera Bellardi (1877), "Clavatula" consularis Bellardi (1877) and "Clavatula" stazzanensis Bellardi (1877). The original generic name was Olegia, but this name turned out to be preoccupied by Olegia Shaposhnikov (1979), necessitating the creation of a replacement name.	
Oligoptyxis khorasanica	Sp. nov	Valid	Guzhov & Nazemi in Raisossadat et al.	Early Cretaceous (Aptian)		Iran	A member of the family Nerineidae.	
Ondina curta	Sp. nov	Valid	Pavia et al.	Pliocene		Italy	A species of Ondina.	
Ondina elongata	Sp. nov	Valid	Pavia et al.	Pliocene		Italy	A species of Ondina.	
Ondina pseudovitrea	Sp. nov	Valid	Pavia et al.	Pliocene		Italy	A species of Ondina.	
Ophieulima lobilloensis	Sp. nov	Valid	Landau & Mulder	Pliocene		Spain	A species of Ophieulima.	
Otostoma cattoi	Sp. nov	Valid	Garvie & Symonds	Early Cretaceous (Albian)	Edwards Formation	United States (Texas)	A member of the family Otostomidae.	
Ovalotrema	Gen. et comb. nov	Valid	Gründel, Hostettler & Menkveld-Gfeller	Late Jurassic (Oxfordian)		France; Switzerland	A member of the family Brachytrematidae. The type species is "Turbo" cotteausius d'Orbigny (1853); genus might also include "Turbo" greppini De Loriol in De Loriol & Koby (1895).	
Palaeoleuca edeni	Sp. nov	Valid	Pacaud	Paleocene (Thanetian) to Eocene (Ypresian)		France	A member of the family Ellobiidae.	
Palaeoleuca gradata	Sp. nov	Valid	Pacaud	Paleocene (Thanetian) to Eocene (Ypresian)		France	A member of the family Ellobiidae.	
Palaeoleuca hulvizensis	Nom. nov	Valid	Pacaud	Paleocene		United Kingdom	A member of the family Ellobiidae; a replacement name for Auricula (Conovulus) pygmaea Morris (1854).	
Paleothyca	Gen. et sp. nov	Valid	Forner, Domènech & Martinell	Early Cretaceous (Albian)		Spain	A member of the family Eulimidae. The type species is P. quinionarii.	
Panneritina	Gen. et comb. et sp. nov	In press	Salvador & Yu	Jurassic and Cretaceous		China; Myanmar	A member of the new family Neritidae. Genus includes Chinese species formerly assigned to the genus Mesoneritina ("M." crassa Pan, 1982, "M." dakangensis Pan, 1978, "M." gansuensis Yu & Guo, 1982, "M." nanshanensis Pan, 1984, "M." opima Yu, 1974, "M." pustula Pan, 1980), as well as new species P. ambrae from the Kachin amber.	
Papuliscala spinosa	Sp. nov	Valid	Landau & Mulder	Pliocene		Spain	A species of Papuliscala.	
Paragoniozona ornata	Nom. nov	Valid	Karapunar et al.	Carboniferous (Pennsylvanian)	Lazy Bend Formation	United States (Texas)	A member of the family Phymatopleuridae; a replacement name for Pleurotomaria aspera Girty (1934).	
Paragoniozona yanceyi	Sp. nov	Valid	Karapunar et al.	Carboniferous (Pennsylvanian)	Boggy Formation	United States (Oklahoma)	A member of the family Phymatopleuridae.	
Perrona grossi	Nom. nov	Valid	Harzhauser, Landau & Janssen	Miocene (Langhian)	Florian Formation	Austria	A species of Perrona; a replacement name for Pleurotoma (Clavatula) auingeri Hilber (1879).	
Perrona ilonae	Nom. nov	Valid	Harzhauser, Landau & Janssen	Miocene (Langhian)	Sámsonháza Formation	Hungary; Ukraine	A species of Perrona; a replacement name for Clavatula vindobonensis nodosa Csepreghy-Meznerics (1954).	
Perrona koeberli	Sp. nov	Valid	Harzhauser, Landau & Janssen	Miocene (Langhian)	Grund Formation	Austria	A species of Perrona.	
Perrona loetschi	Sp. nov	Valid	Harzhauser, Landau & Janssen	Miocene (Langhian)	Grund Formation	Austria	A species of Perrona.	
Perrona wanzenboecki	Nom. nov	Valid	Harzhauser, Landau & Janssen	Miocene (Langhian)	Baden Formation	Austria	A species of Perrona; a replacement name for Pleurotoma concinna Handmann (1883).	
Peruvispira kanchanaburiensis	Sp. nov	In press	Karapunar, Nützel & Ketwetsuriya	Permian	Ratburi Group	Thailand	A member of the family Goniasmatidae.	
Peruvispira oklahomaensis	Sp. nov	Valid	Karapunar et al.	Carboniferous (Pennsylvanian)	Gene Autry Formation	United States (Oklahoma)	A member of the family Goniasmatidae.	
Phymatopleura conica	Sp. nov	Valid	Karapunar et al.	Carboniferous (Pennsylvanian)	Gene Autry Formation	United States (Oklahoma)	A member of the family Phymatopleuridae.	
Phymatopleura girtyi	Sp. nov	Valid	Karapunar et al.	Carboniferous (Pennsylvanian)	Wewoka Formation	United States (Oklahoma)	A member of the family Phymatopleuridae.	
Platyphysa nagensis	Nom. nov	Valid	Pacaud	Cretaceous		India	A replacement name for Physa prinsepii elongata Hislop (1860).	
Pleurotomaria cloutetsensis	Sp. nov	Valid	Chaix in Chaix & Plicot	Late Cretaceous (Santonian)		France		
Pleurotomella obesula	Sp. nov	Valid	Landau, Harzhauser & Giannuzzi-Savelli	Pliocene (Piacenzian)		Spain	A species of Pleurotomella.	
Pleurotomella turrita	Sp. nov	Valid	Landau, Harzhauser & Giannuzzi-Savelli	Pliocene (Piacenzian)		Spain	A species of Pleurotomella.	
Pomatiasia	Gen. et comb. nov	Valid	Guzhov	Miocene		Russia	A member of the family Hydrobiidae. Genus includes "Amnicola" cyclostomoides Sinzov (1880). Published online in 2023, but the issue date is listed as December 2022.	
Propefavartia	Gen. et comb. nov	Valid	Merle in Merle, Garrigues & Pointier	Eocene		France	A member of the family Muricidae belonging to the subfamily Muricopsinae. The type species is "Murex" distans Deshayes (1835).	
Pseudamnicola roblesi	Sp. nov	Valid	Albesa, López & Crespo	Early Miocene	Ribesalbes-Alcora Basin	Spain	A species of Pseudamnicola.	
Pseudamnicola taodonggouensis	Sp. nov	Valid	Zhu	Late Permian	Wutonggou Formation	China	A species of Pseudamnicola.	
Pseudodaphnella iberica	Sp. nov	Valid	Landau, Harzhauser & Giannuzzi-Savelli	Pliocene (Piacenzian)		Spain	A species of Pseudodaphnella.	
Pseudodaphnella velerinensis	Sp. nov	Valid	Landau, Harzhauser & Giannuzzi-Savelli	Pliocene (Piacenzian)		Spain	A species of Pseudodaphnella.	
Pseudodostia lisbonensis	Sp. nov	Valid	Garvie & Symonds	Eocene	Lisbon Formation	United States (Alabama)	A member of the family Neritidae.	
Pseudomelania yamadai	Sp. nov	Valid	Isaji, Haga & Kashiwagi	Early Cretaceous (Barremian)	Kimigahama Formation	Japan		
Pseudonerinea ? pseudomelaniformis	Sp. nov	Valid	Gründel et al.	Late Jurassic (Kimmeridgian)		Germany	A member of Nerineoidea belonging to the family Pseudonerineidae.	
Purpuripullina	Gen. et comb. nov	Valid	Guzhov & Raisossadat in Raisossadat et al.	Cretaceous		Iran; Lebanon	The type species is "Natica" scalaris Conrad (1852).	
Purpuroidea moosleitneri	Sp. nov	Valid	Nützel et al.	Late Triassic (Rhaetian)	Oberrhät Formation	Austria	A member of Caenogastropoda belonging to the family Purpuroideidae.	
Pusionella hofmanni	Sp. nov	Valid	Harzhauser, Landau & Janssen	Miocene (Langhian)	Dej Formation	Romania	A species of Pusionella.	
Ringicula costata chokrakensis	Ssp. nov	Valid	Guzhov	Miocene		Russia	Published online in 2023, but the issue date is listed as December 2022.	
Ringicula costata paratethica	Ssp. nov	Valid	Guzhov	Miocene		Russia	Published online in 2023, but the issue date is listed as December 2022.	
Ringicula subglobosa	Sp. nov	Valid	Guzhov	Miocene		Russia	A species of Ringicula. Published online in 2023, but the issue date is listed as December 2022.	
Saalensia lorioli	Sp. nov	Valid	Gründel, Hostettler & Menkveld-Gfeller	Late Jurassic (Oxfordian)	St-Ursanne Formation	Switzerland	A member of the family Brachytrematidae.	
Shansiella (Oklahomaella) globilineata	Sp. nov	Valid	Karapunar et al.	Carboniferous (Pennsylvanian)	Gene Autry Formation	United States (Oklahoma)	A member of the family Portlockiellidae.	
Sigmesalia anatole	Sp. nov	Valid	Hoşgör & Pacaud	Paleocene (Danian)	Çaldağ Formation	Turkey	A member of the family Turritellidae.	
Sigmesalia arguta	Sp. nov	Valid	Berezovsky in Berezovsky & Demyanov	Eocene	Mandrikovka Beds	Ukraine	A member of the family Turritellidae.	
Sigmesalia captiosa	Sp. nov	Valid	Berezovsky & Demyanov	Eocene	Mandrikovka Beds	Ukraine	A member of the family Turritellidae.	
Sigmesalia erifensis	Sp. nov	Valid	Hoşgör & Pacaud	Paleocene (Danian)	Çaldağ Formation	Turkey	A member of the family Turritellidae.	
Skenea gofasi	Sp. nov	Valid	Landau & Mulder	Pliocene		Spain	A species of Skenea.	
Specula estebbunensis	Sp. nov	Valid	Landau & Mulder	Pliocene		Spain	A species of Specula.	
Spinatus ruizi	Sp. nov	Valid	Liverani & Wieneke	Miocene (Langhian)		Indonesia	A member of the family Strombidae.	
Spiroscala quasipulchra	Nom. nov	Valid	Karapunar et al.	Permian		United States	A member of the family Eotomariidae; a replacement name for Euconospira pulchra Batten (1958).	
Spiroscala shwedagoniformis	Sp. nov	Valid	Karapunar et al.	Carboniferous (Pennsylvanian)	Gene Autry Formation	United States (Oklahoma)	A member of the family Eotomariidae.	
Striopusionella	Gen. et comb. nov	Valid	Harzhauser, Landau & Janssen	Miocene (Langhian)		Hungary	A member of the family Clavatulidae. The type species is "Clavatula" szekelyhidiae Kovács & Vicián (2021).	
Stuoraxis kasei	Sp. nov	Valid	Isaji, Haga & Kashiwagi	Early Cretaceous (Barremian)	Kimigahama Formation	Japan	A member of the family Stuoraxidae.	
Stuorella zapfei	Sp. nov	Valid	Nützel et al.	Late Triassic (Rhaetian)	Oberrhät Formation	Austria	A member of Vetigastropoda belonging to the family Stuorellidae.	
Subpterynotus eocaenicus	Sp. nov		Merle, Lesport & Ledon	Eocene (Bartonian)		France	A species of Subpterynotus.	
Subpterynotus mainotensis	Sp. nov		Merle, Lesport & Ledon	Miocene (Aquitanian)		France	A species of Subpterynotus.	
Talassia plioalboranensis	Sp. nov	Valid	Landau & Mulder	Pliocene		Spain	A species of Talassia.	
Teretia inflatissima	Sp. nov	Valid	Landau, Harzhauser & Giannuzzi-Savelli	Pliocene (Piacenzian)		Spain	A species of Teretia.	
Thalassonerita hagai	Sp. nov	Valid	Kiel et al.	Miocene	Amlang Formation	Philippines	A member of the family Phenacolepadidae.	
Tomellana aueri	Sp. nov	Valid	Harzhauser, Landau & Janssen	Miocene (Langhian)	Baden Formation	Austria; Bulgaria; Hungary; Romania; Slovakia; Slovenia	A species of Tomellana.	
Tomellana dulaii	Sp. nov	Valid	Harzhauser, Landau & Janssen	Miocene (Langhian)	Dej Formation	Hungary; Romania	A species of Tomellana.	
Tomellana onubensis	Sp. nov	Valid	Landau & Harzhauser	Early Pliocene		Spain	A species of Tomellana.	
Tomellana postjouannetii	Sp. nov	Valid	Landau & Harzhauser	Pliocene (Piacenzian)		Spain	A species of Tomellana.	
Tortaxis zhangpuensis	Sp. nov	In press	Yu, Páll-Gergely & Salvador	Miocene	Zhangpu amber	China		
Tosapusia peregrina	Sp. nov	Valid	Bertaccini et al.	Pliocene		Italy	A species of Tosapusia.	
Trigonostoma ariejansseni	Sp. nov	Valid	Roosen	Miocene		Germany	A species of Trigonostoma.	
Tudorella lenneae	Sp. nov	Valid	Groh et al.	Pliocene		Spain (Canary Islands)	A species of Tudorella.	
Tudorella rothei	Sp. nov	Valid	Groh et al.	Pliocene		Spain (Canary Islands)	A species of Tudorella.	
Turbonilla yadongensis	Sp. nov		Li, Li & Garvie	Eocene (Ypresian)	Zhupure Formation	China	A species of Turbonilla.	
Valvata complanusa	Sp. nov	Valid	Zhu	Late Permian	Wutonggou Formation	China	A species of Valvata.	
Varicoturbo	Gen. et sp. nov	Valid	Nützel, Schweigert & Karapunar	Late Triassic (Carnian)	San Cassiano Formation	Italy	A member of the family Seguenziidae. Genus includes new species V. microstriatus.	
Worthenia (Yochelsonospira) kuesi	Sp. nov	Valid	Karapunar et al.	Carboniferous (Pennsylvanian)	Wetumka Formation	United States (Oklahoma)	A species of Worthenia.	
Xinjiangospira habita	Sp. nov	Valid	Zhu	Late Permian	Wutonggou Formation	China	A member of the family Hydrobiidae.	

=== Gastropod research ===
- A study on transitions from water to land throughout the evolutionary history of gastropods is published by Vermeij & Watson-Zink (2022).
- A study on changes in gastropod diversity at the genus/subgenus level from the Norian to the Pliensbachian is published by Ferrari & Hautmann (2022), who report that gastropods lost 56% of genera/subgenera during the Triassic–Jurassic extinction event, which was much more than the average loss of marine life at the time, and attempt to determine potential causes of the end-Triassic extinctions of gastropods.
- A study aiming to determine the drivers of diversification for European freshwater gastropods over the past 100 million years is published by Neubauer et al. (2022).
- A study aiming to determine the factors which caused the diversification of European freshwater gastropods in the Late Cretaceous is published by Neubauer & Harzhauser (2022).
- Revision of the fossil material of Ancistrolepis from the Eocene (Ypresian) Llajas Formation (California, United States), representing the oldest occurrence of this genus reported to date, is published by Squires (2022).

== Other molluscs ==
=== New taxa ===
Name	Novelty	Status	Authors	Age	Type locality	Location	Notes	Images
Calloplax roederi	Sp. nov	Valid	Vendrasco, Powell & LaFollette	Miocene		United States (California)	A chiton.	
Chiton solaris	Sp. nov	Valid	Vendrasco, Powell & LaFollette	Miocene		United States (California)	A chiton.	
Dorispira avannga	Sp. nov	Valid	Peel & Kouchinsky	Cambrian (Wuliuan)	Henson Gletscher Formation	Greenland	A helcionellid.	
Dorispira? lemdadensis	Sp. nov		Mghazli et al.	Cambrian		Morocco		
Dorispira septentrionalis	Sp. nov	Valid	Peel & Kouchinsky	Cambrian (Wuliuan)	Henson Gletscher Formation	Greenland	A helcionellid.	
Dorispira tavsenensis	Sp. nov	Valid	Peel & Kouchinsky	Cambrian (Wuliuan)	Henson Gletscher Formation	Greenland	A helcionellid.	
Dorispira tippik	Sp. nov	Valid	Peel & Kouchinsky	Cambrian (Wuliuan)	Henson Gletscher Formation	Greenland	A helcionellid.	
Erugoconus	Gen. et sp. nov	Valid	Peel & Kouchinsky	Cambrian (Wuliuan)	Henson Gletscher Formation	Greenland	A member of Helcionelloida of uncertain affinities. The type species is E. acuminatus.	
Hoarepora	Nom. nov	Valid	Mapes in Mazaev	Carboniferous (Pennsylvanian)		United States	A rostroconch; a replacement name for Oxyprora Hoare, Mapes & Yancey (2002).	
Ischnochiton loureiroi	Sp. nov	Valid	Dell'Angelo et al.	Pliocene	Mondego Basin	Portugal	A chiton, a species of Ischnochiton.	
Lepidochitona rochae	Sp. nov	Valid	Dell'Angelo et al.	Pliocene	Mondego Basin	Portugal	A chiton, a species of Lepidochitona.	
Scenella? siku	Sp. nov	Valid	Peel & Kouchinsky	Cambrian (Wuliuan)	Henson Gletscher Formation	Greenland	A member of Helcionelloida. Originally tentatively assigned to the genus Scenella, but subsequently made the type species of the separate genus Hensoniconus.	
Sermeqiconus	Gen. et comb. nov	Valid	Peel & Kouchinsky	Cambrian	Aftenstjernesø Formation	Greenland	A helcionellid. The type species is "Figurina" polaris Peel (2021).	
Tavseniconus	Gen. et sp. nov	Valid	Peel & Kouchinsky	Cambrian (Wuliuan)	Henson Gletscher Formation	Greenland	A member of Helcionelloida of uncertain affinities. The type species is T. erectus.	
Vendrascospira	Gen. et 2 sp. nov	Valid	Peel & Kouchinsky	Cambrian (Wuliuan)	Henson Gletscher Formation	Greenland	A helcionellid. The type species is V. troelseni; genus also includes V. frykmani.	
Yochelcionella gracilituba	Sp. nov		Mghazli et al.	Cambrian		Morocco		
Yochelcionella longituba	Sp. nov		Mghazli et al.	Cambrian		Morocco		

=== Other mollusc research ===
- Revision of the oldest known specimens of Jinonicella kolebabai from the Middle Ordovician strata of Ukraine and Belarus is published by Gubanov et al. (2022), who report the preservation of growth lines which were previously documented only in Silurian specimens.
- New information on the anatomy of Typhloesus wellsi is presented by Conway Morris & Caron (2022), who consider it plausible that Typhloesus was a pelagic mollusc with possible affinities with gastropods.
