= Gryponautilus =

Gryponautilus Temporal range: Late Triassic

Scientific classification
- Domain: Eukaryota
- Kingdom: Animalia
- Phylum: Mollusca
- Class: Cephalopoda
- Subclass: Nautiloidea
- Order: Nautilida
- Family: †Grypoceratidae
- Genus: †Gryponautilus; Mojsisovics, 1902

Extinct genus of molluscs

Gryponautilus is a genus of Upper Triassic nautilids (generally coiled nautiloid cephalopods) belonging to the trigonoceratacean family Grypoceratidae, characterized by involute, inflated shells, which at maturity develop narrowly rounded keel-like venters. Venters on inner whorls are truncated and broadly convex to concave.

Immature forms bear a resemblance to Grypoceras.
