= Titanoceras =

Titanoceras Temporal range: Pennsylvanian - Permian

Scientific classification
- Domain: Eukaryota
- Kingdom: Animalia
- Phylum: Mollusca
- Class: Cephalopoda
- Subclass: Nautiloidea
- Order: Nautilida
- Family: †Grypoceratidae
- Genus: †Titanoceras; Hyatt (1884)

Extinct genus of nautiloids

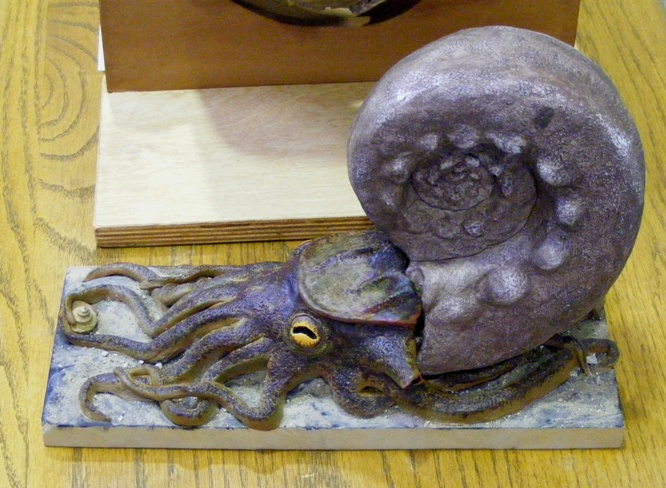

Titanoceras is an extinct genus in the nautiloid order Nautilida from the Pennsylvanian and Lower Permian of North America and Western Australia.

Titanoceras grew to be fairly large, with a tightly spiraled shell that reached a diameter of about 8 in (20 cm +) with about three volutions. The inner coils are partially enveloped by the next outer, resulting in a channel or impression along the inner rim, the dorsum. Otherwise all whorls are visible. (The descriptive term is evolute). Whorls have a somewhat rectangular cross section that is wider than high; in contrast with the otherwise similar and contemporary Domatoceras. The venter, which forms the outer rim, may be broadly arched. Septa are close spaced making chambers broad but short. Sutures have shallow lobes along the sides and across the venter and short saddles in between, along the ventro-lateral shoulders, but go straight across the dorsum.

Titanoceras is found is limestone, indicating it lived in shallow-water carbonate banks. It could no doubt swim, but probably was not an active swimmer unlike fish and squid. It most likely spent its time crawling over or just above the sea floor. Titanoceras probably preyed upon crustaceans, bottom fish, and perhaps other cephalopods.

Titanoceras is placed in the Grypoceratidae, a family of similar genera within the Nautilida. Nautilid families that are more similar and have a common ancestor are combined in superfamilies. The Grypoceratidae are part of the Trigonocerataceae.
