= August Schenk =

Austrian-born German botanist and paleobotanist

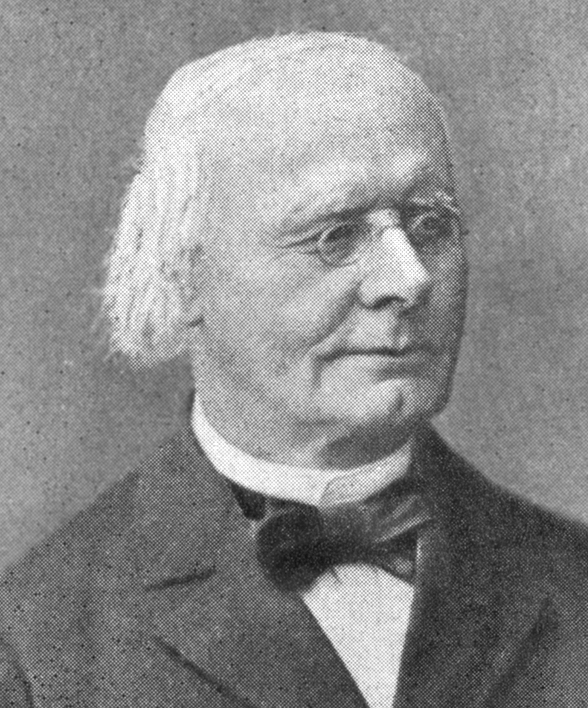
August Schenk

Joseph August Schenk (17 April 1815, in Hallein – 30 March 1891, in Leipzig) was an Austrian-born, German botanist and paleobotanist.

In 1837, he obtained his medical doctorate from the Ludwig-Maximilians-Universität München, followed by studies in botany at the University of Erlangen, the Friedrich Wilhelm University of Berlin, and the University of Vienna. In 1840, he earned his PhD in botany at the Ludwig-Maximilians-Universität München and during the following year, received his habilitation for botany with the dissertation "Genera et species Cyperacearum, quae in regno Graeco, archipelago et in insulis". From 1850 to 1868, he was a full professor of botany at the University of Würzburg, followed by a professorship at Leipzig University (1868 to 1887), where he was a successor to Georg Heinrich Mettenius. At Leipzig, he was also director of its botanical gardens.

The genus Schenkia (family Gentianaceae) was named in honor by August Grisebach in 1853.

== Published works ==
With Christian Luerssen, he was co-author of Mittheilungen aus dem Gesammtgebiete der Botanik (Volume 1-2, 1874). Also, he made contributions towards Ferdinand Freiherr von Richthofen's "China" (Volume 4), and edited the section on Alstroemeriaceae in Carl Friedrich Philipp von Martius' Flora Brasiliensis. The following are a few of Schenk's principal works:

- Flora der Umgebung von Würzburg. Aufzählung der um Würzburg vorkommenden phanerogamen Gefäßpflanzen. Ein Beitrag zur Flora von Bayern, Regensburg 1848 - Flora around Würzburg, etc.
- Beiträge zur Flora des Keupers und der rätischen Formation, 1864 - Contributions to the flora of the Keuper and Rhaetian formations.
- Beiträge zur Flora der Vorwelt, two volumes, Kassel 1866-1871 - Treatise on flora of the primeval world.
- Die fossile Flora der Grenzschichten des Keupers und Lias Frankens, Wiesbaden 1867 - Fossil flora involving the boundary layers of the Keuper and Franconian Lias.
- Handbuch der Botanik, four volumes, Breslau, (as an editor, Series: Encyklopaedie der Naturwissenschaften) 1879-1890 - Manual of botany.
- Fossile Pflanzen aus der Albourskette, (collected by geologist Emil Tietze) 1887 - Fossil plants of the Elburz chain.
- Die fossilen Pflanzenreste, Breslau, E. Trewendt, 1888 - Fossilized plant remains.
