= Gene Autry (disambiguation) =

Gene Autry (1907–1998) was an American singing cowboy.

The name may also refer to:

- The Gene Autry Show, a television program
- Gene Autry's Melody Ranch, a radio program
- "Gene Autry", a song by the band Beulah from their 2001 album The Coast Is Never Clear
- Gene Autry, Oklahoma, a town
- Gene Autry Formation, a geological formation
- Gene Autry Shale, a geological formation
- Autry Museum of the American West, a museum founded as the Gene Autry Western Heritage Museum
