= Grypoceras =

Grypoceras Temporal range: Triassic

Scientific classification
- Domain: Eukaryota
- Kingdom: Animalia
- Phylum: Mollusca
- Class: Cephalopoda
- Subclass: Nautiloidea
- Order: Nautilida
- Family: †Grypoceratidae
- Genus: †Grypoceras; Hyatt, 1883

Extinct genus of nautiloids

Grypoceras is a coiled nautiloid cephalopod from the Triassic of western North America, southern Asia, and Europe that belongs to the nautilid family Grypoceratidae. Named by Alpheus Hyatt in 1883, the shell of Grypoceras is essentially involute with a subtriangular cross section, widest across the umbilical shoulders, with flanks fairing toward a narrow flattened venter. Sutures on flanks are with smooth, deep lobes and with shallow ventral lobes.

The earlier, related Domatoceras is evolute, with a more quadrate whorl section. Gryponautilus, from the Upper Triassic, is more strongly involute and has a sharply keeled venter.
