= Stearoceras =

Stearoceras Temporal range: U Carb (Penn) - L Perm

Scientific classification
- Domain: Eukaryota
- Kingdom: Animalia
- Phylum: Mollusca
- Class: Cephalopoda
- Subclass: Nautiloidea
- Order: Nautilida
- Family: †Grypoceratidae
- Genus: †Stearoceras

Extinct genus of molluscs

Stearoceras is an extinct genus of prehistoric nautiloids from the Lower Pennsylvanian (Upper Carboniferous) - Lower Permian with a fair worldwide distribution.(Kümmel 1964)

Stearoceras is recognized by its involute shell with a depressed subtrapizoidal whorl section and slight ventral and lateral lobes. In contrast Stenoporceras is subdiscoidal and has a suture with broad lateral lobes and a deep ventral saddle as found in syringonautilids.(ibid)

Nautiloids are a subclass of shelled cephalopods that were once diverse and numerous but are now represented by only a handful of species.

== See also ==
- Nautiloid
  - List of nautiloids
