= Trigonoceratidae =

Trigonoceratidae Temporal range: L Carb (Miss) - L Perm

Scientific classification
- Kingdom: Animalia
- Phylum: Mollusca
- Class: Cephalopoda
- Subclass: Nautiloidea
- Order: Nautilida
- Superfamily: †Trigonoceratoidea
- Family: †Trigonoceratidae; Hyatt, 1884

Genera
- See text

Extinct family of nautiloids

The Trigonoceratidae is a family of coiled nautiloid cephalopods that lived during the period from the Early Carboniferous (Mississippian) to the Early Permian.

== Diagnosis ==
Trigonoceratidae comprise members of the order Nautilida characterized by a loosely coiled to evolute shell generally bearing longitudinal ribs or ridges with a whorl section that is oval to subquadrate and varying from compressed (squeezed) to depressed (flattened). (Kummel 1964)

== Classification and phylogeny ==
=== Taxonomic position ===
The Trigonoceratidae along with four other related families are combined in the Superfamily Trigonocerataceae in the Treatise,(ibid Kummel) a superfamily. They are also the Triboloceratidae (Flower and Kummel, 1950) which form the Tribolocerataceae within the Centroceratina of the Osnovy according to Shimansky. The Trigonocerataceae and Centroceratina are essentially equivalent as are the Trigonoceratidae and Triboloceratidae.

=== Derivation ===
The Trigonerceratidae were derived from the core Centroceratidae (basis for the name Centroceratina) early in the Mississippian along with the longer lived Grypoceratidae. Of the five families of the Trigonocerataceae, the Trigonoceratidae was defined first, by Hyatt in 1884, hence the choice of name.

== Generic composition ==
Seventeen trigonoceratid genera are listed in the Treatise. All but one are found in the Lower Carboniferous of Europe and equivalent Mississippian of North America.(ibid Kummel)

=== Geographic distribution ===
Mississippian Genera from North America alone

- Chouteauoceras
- Diodoceras
- Imonautilus

Mississippian Genera from North America and Europe (L Carb)

- Aphelaeceras
- Maccoyoceras
- Rineceras
- Stroboceras
- Thrincoceras -- -- extends to Lower Permian
- Vestinautilus

Mississippian (L Carb) Genera from Europe

- Trigonoceras
- Discitoceras
- Epistroboceras
- Leuroceras
- Lispoceras
- Mesochasmoceras
- Pararineceras
- Subclymenia

Lower Permian Central Asia

- Apogonoceras -- see Thrincoceras

=== Morphological variations ===
Trigonoceras, type genus, named by Hyatt, 1844, is unique among the Trigonoceratidae in the Treatise. It is the only genus included that has a subtriangular whorl section consisting of a broad concave venter and narrow dorsum. The remaining can be divided on the basis of shell morphology into those that are smooth, at least on the outer whorl, those with numerous equal longitudinal ribs or lirae, and those with prominent longitudinal ridges separated by wide grooves or sulci.(ibid Kummel)

Those with smooth whorls include Leuroceras and Mesochasmoceras; those with numerous longitudinal ribs or lirae include Chouteauoceras, Discitoceras, and Rineceras; and those with prominent, wide spaced, longitudinal ridges are such as Stroboceras and Vestinautilus.

Trigonoceratid genera can also be grouped on the basis of the suture which may be essentially straight and transverse or slightly sinuous, or may have a well defined ventral lobe, or a ventral saddle. Those with straight or slightly sinuous sutures are Apogonoceras, Diodoroceras, Discitocdras, Rineceras, Stroboceras, and Thrincoceras; with a discernible ventral lobe: Aphelaeceras, Epistroboceras, Lispoceras, Maccoyoceras, Pararineceras, Subclymenia, and Vestinutilus; and with a ventral saddle: Chouteauoceras and Leuroceras.

Ventral saddles are also found in the Centroceratidae in Carlloceras and Phacoceras, in the Grypoceratidae in Stenopoceras and Parastenopoceras, and in the Syringonautilidae.(ibid Kummel)
