= Rineceras =

Rineceras Temporal range: Mississippian (L Carb

Scientific classification
- Domain: Eukaryota
- Kingdom: Animalia
- Phylum: Mollusca
- Class: Cephalopoda
- Subclass: Nautiloidea
- Order: Nautilida
- Family: †Trigonoceratidae
- Genus: †Rineceras; Hyatt, 1893

Extinct genus of nautiloids

Rineceras is an extinct genus from the nautilid family Trigonoceratidae which is part of the Trigonocerataceae, that lived during the Mississippian Period in the late Paleozoic.

Rineceras is described in the Treatise, in Kummel, 1964, as being evolute with volutions in contact but not deeply impressed at maturity and the whorl section elliptical and depressed; the conch (shell) bearing prominent longitudinal ridges, which may be spinose. Rinceras is illustrated, fig. 311-4 p. K429, as a closely coiled gyrocone of about two volutions, whorls not in contact. Longitudinal ridges (ribs) are shown. The illustration is designated as R. propinquum (DeKoninck), the type.

Rineceras is similar to Pararineceras, Thrincoceras, Discitoceras, and Chouteauoceras in that all are covered by numerous longitudinal ridges.

Rineceras was named by Hyatt in 1893. It is based on Gyroceras propinquum DeKoninck, 1880, found in the Lower Carboniferous of Belgium.
