= Stenopopanoceras =

Stenopopanoceras Temporal range: Anisian

Scientific classification
- Kingdom: Animalia
- Phylum: Mollusca
- Class: Cephalopoda
- Subclass: †Ammonoidea
- Order: †Ceratitida
- Family: †Parapopanoceratidae
- Genus: †Stenopopanoceras; Popov, 1961

Extinct genus of ammonites

Stenopopanoceras is a genus of involute, discoidal ceratitid ammonites from the Middle Triassic that has been found on Spitsbergen and in arctic Russia and British Columbia.

The name, Stenopopanoceras, indicates that its shell as compressed, relatively thin; involute as for the family. The siphuncle is ventral throughout, unlike Parapopanoceras where in the siphuncle starts off more centrally located and migrates within the first few whorls to become ventral. Septal necks start off retrochoanitic, pointing to the rear, but by the beginning of the third whorl are prochoanitic, forward pointing.

Related general include Amphipopanoceras and Parapopanoceras.
