= Canyon Group =

Geologic group in Texas, United States

- Stratigraphic range: Carboniferous
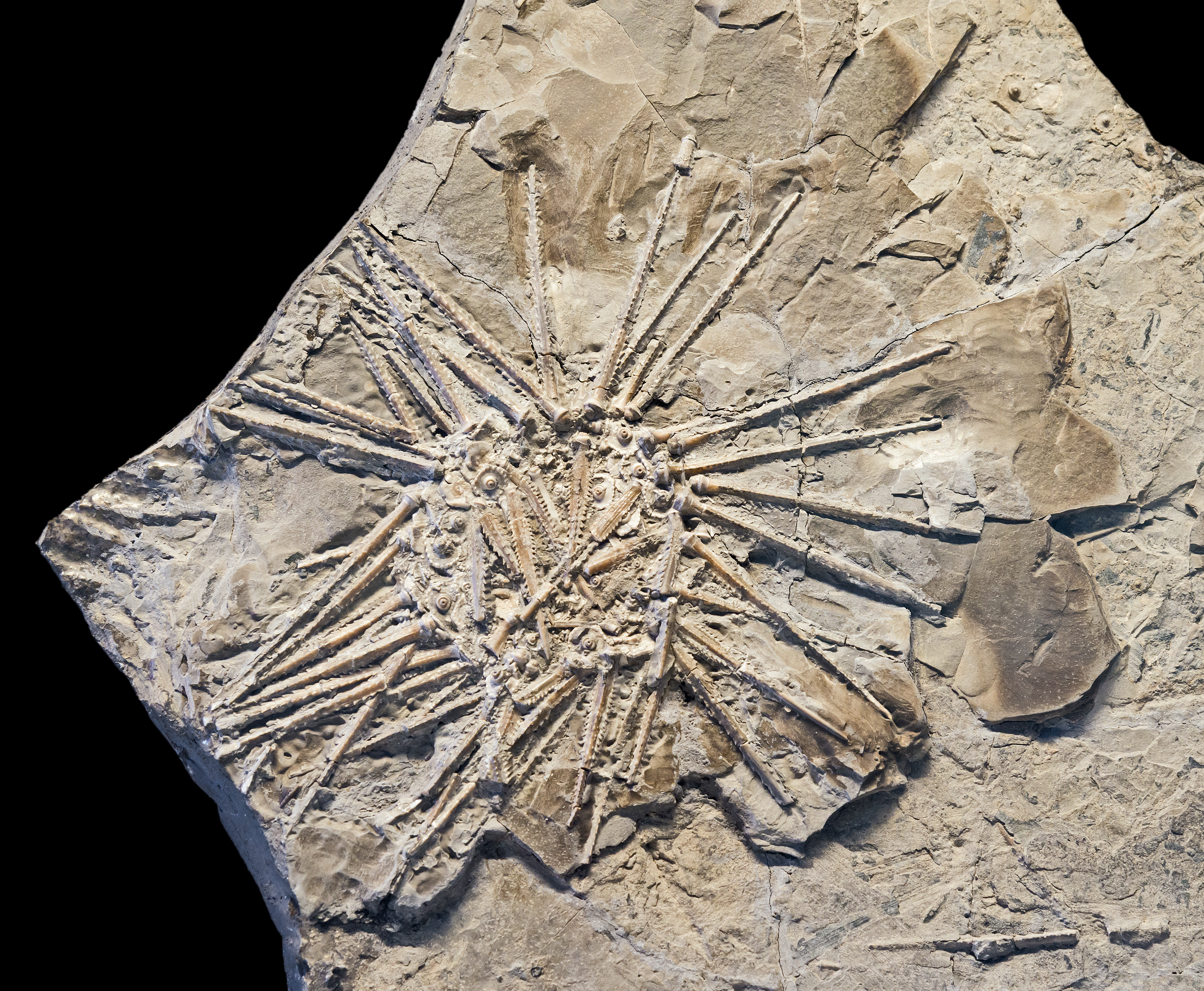
- Fossil from the Winchell Formation, Canyon Group
- Type: Group
- Sub-units: Caddo Creek, Graford, Palo Pinto, Wolf Mountain Shale & Winchell Formations

Location
- Coordinates: 31.5°N 98.6°W
- Approximate paleocoordinates: 7.8°S 34.6°W
- Region: Texas
- Country: United States
- Canyon Group (Texas)

The Canyon Group is a geologic group in Texas. It preserves fossils dating back to the Carboniferous period. It contains the Caddo Creek, Graford, Palo Pinto, Wolf Mountain Shale and Winchell Formations.

== See also ==
- List of fossiliferous stratigraphic units in Texas
- Paleontology in Texas
