= Aphelaeceras =

Aphelaeceras Temporal range: Mississippian (= L Carb

Scientific classification
- Domain: Eukaryota
- Kingdom: Animalia
- Phylum: Mollusca
- Class: Cephalopoda
- Subclass: Nautiloidea
- Order: Nautilida
- Family: †Trigonoceratidae
- Genus: †Aphelaeceras; Hyatt, 1884

Extinct genus of molluscs

Aphelaeceras is an extinct genus from the nautilid family Trigonoceratidae which is part of the Trigonocerataceae, that lived during the Mississippian Period in the late Paleozoic.

'Aphelaeceras is evolute, compressed, with a wide umbilicus and small dorsal impression. Whorl section is subrectangular with convex sides that slope toward a concave venter. Ventral shoulder are subangular, umbilical shoulders broadly rounded. The suture has a narrow ventral lobe and broad lateral lobes. The siphuncle is barely ventral from the center.

Aphelaeceras has been found in Mississippian (L. Carb) strata in North America and Europe. The genus was named by Hyatt, 1844. The type, A. difficile (DeKoninck) came from Belgium.

Mesochasmoceras, from the Lower Carboniferous of Europe is similar in having a concave venter but early whorls are nearly ovate in cross section and the umbilicus has a wide perforation.
