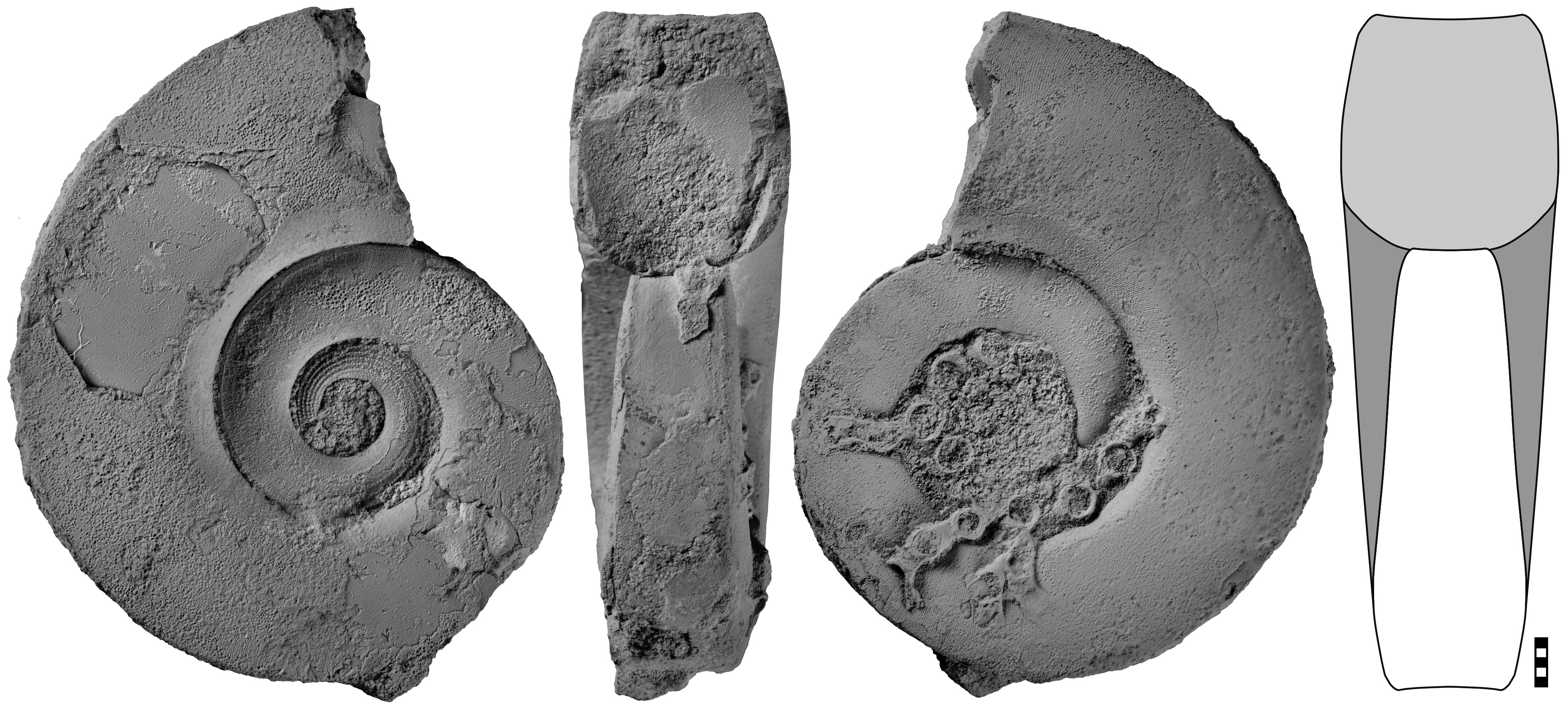
- Maccoyoceras concavum

Scientific classification
- Domain: Eukaryota
- Kingdom: Animalia
- Phylum: Mollusca
- Class: Cephalopoda
- Subclass: Nautiloidea
- Order: Nautilida
- Family: †Trigonoceratidae
- Genus: †Maccoyoceras; Miller, Dunbar, & Condra, 1933

= Maccoyoceras =

Maccoyoceras Temporal range: Mississippian

Extinct genus of molluscs

Maccoyoceras is a genus of nautilids included in the family Trigonoceratidae from the Mississippian of North America (Michigan) and Europe.

The shell of Maccoyocerasis evolute, volutions only slightly impressed, whorl section hexagonal. Venter flattened, flanks converging, umbilical shoulder prominent. Siphuncle slender, ventral of whorl center.
