= Parapopanoceras =

Parapopanoceras Temporal range: Anisian

Scientific classification
- Kingdom: Animalia
- Phylum: Mollusca
- Class: Cephalopoda
- Subclass: †Ammonoidea
- Order: †Ceratitida
- Family: †Parapopanoceratidae
- Genus: †Parapopanoceras; Haug, 1894

Species
- Parapopanoceras asseretoi Dagys and Ermakova, 1981; Parapopanoceras bartrumi Browne, 1952; Parapopanoceras dzeginense Voinova 1947; Parapopanoceras fraseri Browne, 1952; Parapopanoceras inconstans Dagys and Ermakova, 1981; Parapopanoceras izosovi Zakharov et al., 2026; Parapopanoceras malmgreni Lindstroem, 1865; Parapopanoceras paniculatum Popov, 1961; Parapopanoceras plicatum Bychkov et al., 1976; Parapopanoceras tepungai Browne, 1952; Parapopanoceras torelli Mojsisovics, 1886; Parapopanoceras wapii Skwarko, 1973

Synonyms
- Dienerites Mojsisovics, 1902

Extinct genus of molluscs

Parapopanoceras is a ceratitid ammonite with a small, smooth, very involute and moderately globose shell that lived during the middle Triassic.

Parapopanoceras normally has 6 to 7 whorls in its phragmocone, seldom as much as nine, with a body chamber 1-1.5 whorls in length. The suture is ceratitic with phylloid (leaf-like) saddles and subdivided lobes. The siphuncle begins at a central or subcentral position and in most species becomes ventral at the end of the second whorl. In all species septal nacks are short retrochoanitic (point adapically) in the first whorl, are transitory in the second whorl, and become prochoanitic (point adorally) in the third whorl and thereafter. Closely related Stenopopanoceras differs in that its siphuncle starts off ventral.

Parapopanoceras was named by Haug in 1994. The type species is Popanoceras verneuili Mojsisovics 1886. Related genera include Amphipopanoceras and Stenopopanoceras.

== Distribution ==
Fossils have been found in Svalbard, Jan Mayen, British Columbia, the Russian Federation, and possibly Papua New Guinea.
