= Diplesioceras =

Diplesioceras Temporal range: Bajocian

Scientific classification
- Kingdom: Animalia
- Phylum: Mollusca
- Class: Cephalopoda
- Subclass: Ammonoidea
- Genus: Diplesioceras Buckman, 1920

Extinct genus of molluscs

Diplesioceras is an extinct genus from a well-known class of fossil cephalopods, the ammonites. It lived during the Bajocian period.
