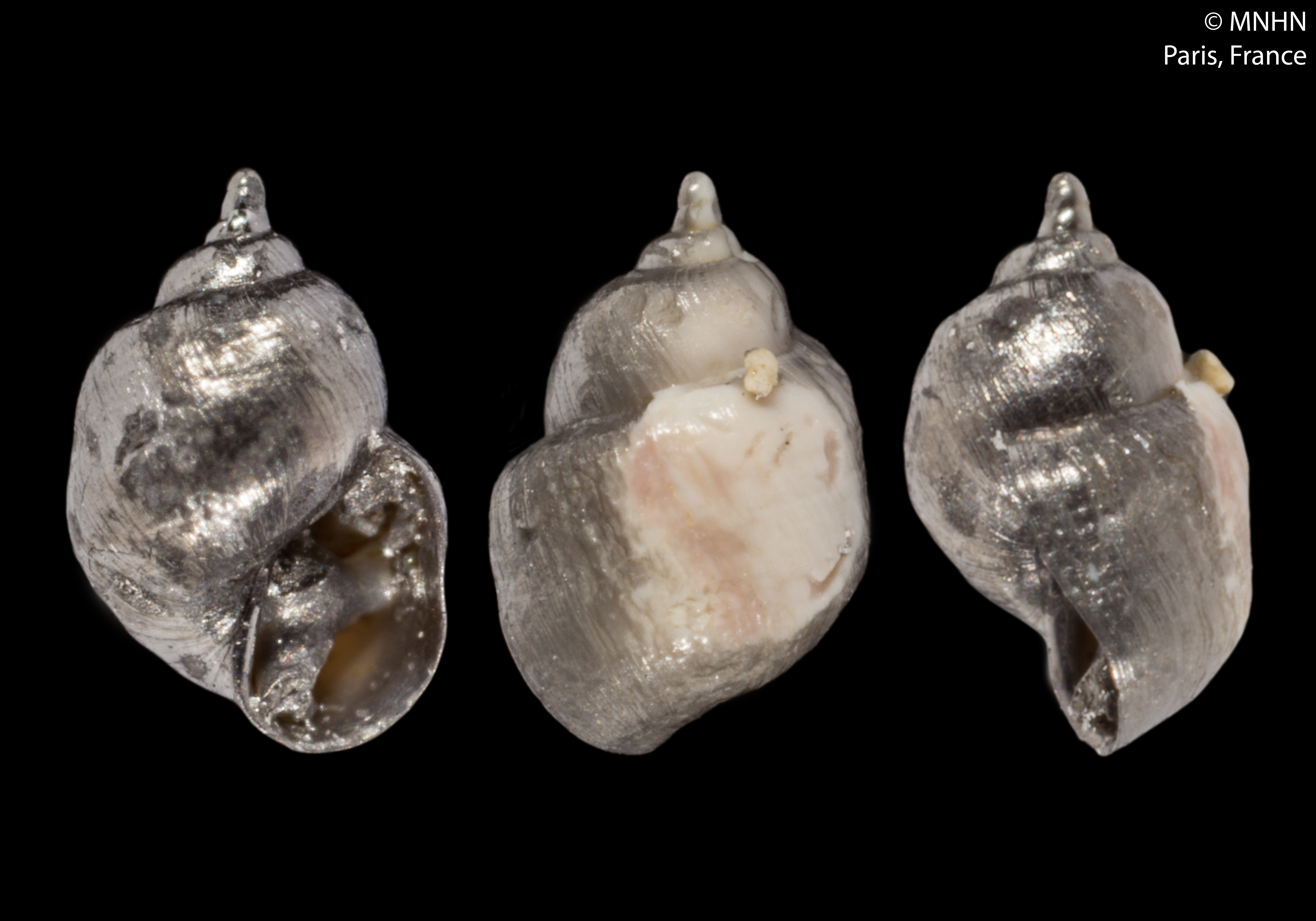
- Shell of † Ophieulima antecessor (holotype at MNHN, Paris)

Scientific classification
- Kingdom: Animalia
- Phylum: Mollusca
- Class: Gastropoda
- Subclass: Caenogastropoda
- Order: Littorinimorpha
- Superfamily: Vanikoroidea
- Family: Eulimidae
- Genus: Ophieulima; Warén & Sibuet, 1981

Type species
- Stilifer minima Dall, 1927

= Ophieulima =

Genus of gastropods

Ophieulima is a genus of parasitic sea snails, marine gastropod mollusks in the family Eulimidae.

== Species ==
- † Ophieulima antecessor Lozouet, 1999
- Ophieulima fuscoapicata Warén, 1981
- † Ophieulima ligeriana Landau, Van Dingenen & Ceulemans, 2023
- † Ophieulima lobilloensis Landau & Mulder, 2022
- Ophieulima minima (Dall, 1927)
- Ophieulima yoshiharai Takano, Kohtsuka & Okanishi, 2024
