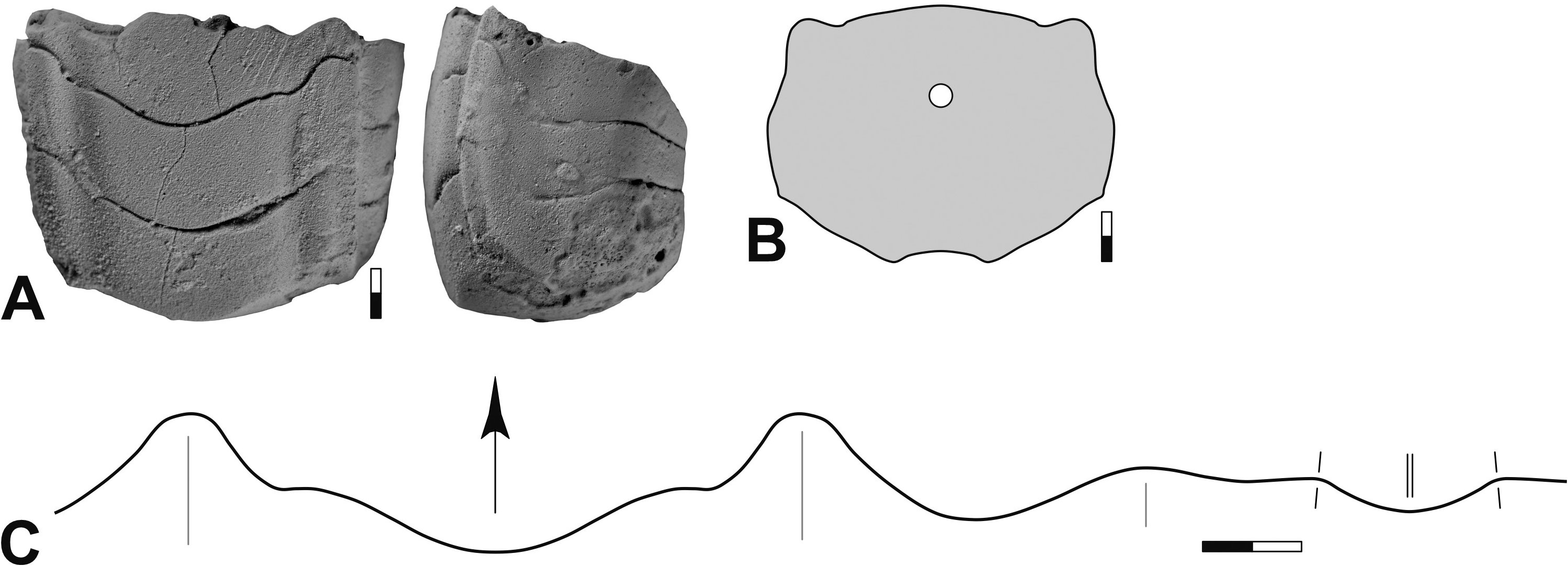
- Stroboceras sp. from Timimoun, specimen MB.C.30460 (Korn et al. 2002 Coll.). A. Ventral and lateral views. B. Whorl profile. C. Suture line, at ww = 14.3 mm, wh = 10.3 mm. Scale bar units = 1 mm

Scientific classification
- Kingdom: Animalia
- Phylum: Mollusca
- Class: Cephalopoda
- Subclass: Nautiloidea
- Order: Nautilida
- Family: †Trigonoceratidae
- Genus: †Stroboceras; Hyatt, 1884

= Stroboceras =

Extinct genus of molluscs

Stroboceras is an extinct genus of nautiloids named by Hyatt in 1884 that's included in the nautilid family Trigonoceratidae; the group that have rise to the Nautilidae which includes the living Nautilus.

Stroboceras is characterized by a loosely coiled evolute shell bearing prominent longitudinal ridges and grooves; with a variable cross section, generally higher than wide, flanks convergent on the venter, and a subcentral siphuncle.
