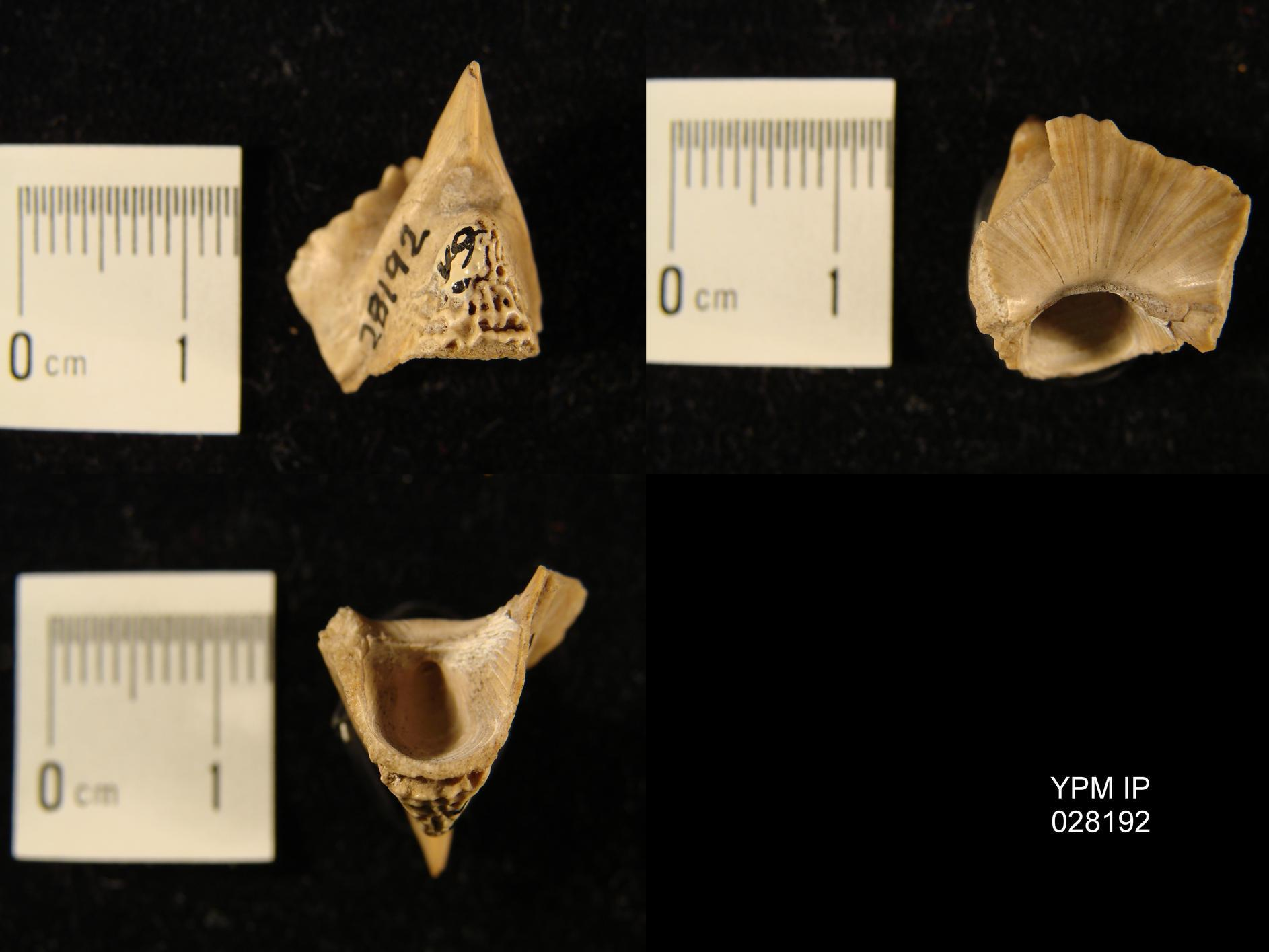
- Belosepia sepioidea

Scientific classification
- Kingdom: Animalia
- Phylum: Mollusca
- Class: Cephalopoda
- Order: Sepiida
- Family: †Belosaepiidae
- Genus: †Belosaepia; Dixon, 1850

Species
- †B. blainvillii (Deshayes, 1835); †B. brevispina J. De C. Sowerby, 1850; †B. oweni J. De C. Sowerby, 1850; †B. penna Garvie, 1996; †B. sepioidea (Blainville, 1825); †B. tricarinata (Watelet, 1851); †B. ungula Gabb, 1860 (= B. uncinata, B. harrisi, B. alabamensis voltzi Palmer, 1937); †B. veatchii Palmer, 1937 (= B. alabamensis Palmer, 1937)

Synonyms
- †Belosepia Bronn, 1830

= Belosaepia =

Belosaepia Temporal range: Eocene

Extinct genus of molluscs

Belosaepia is an extinct genus of cuttlefish-like cephalopod known from the Eocene.

== Morphology ==
Species of the genus Belosaepia reached 18 centimetres (7.1 in) in length and 5 centimetres (2.0 in) across and had a large siphuncle that penetrated its oblique septa. The shell was endogastrically coiled. It had a small belemnite-like guard, which took the form of a short horn at the posterior end of the shell; usually, only a small portion of the shell closest to the guard is preserved. The chambers in the shell closely resemble those present in the cuttlebone of modern cuttlefish.

== Ecology ==
Species of the genus Belosaepia lived close to the sea floor.
