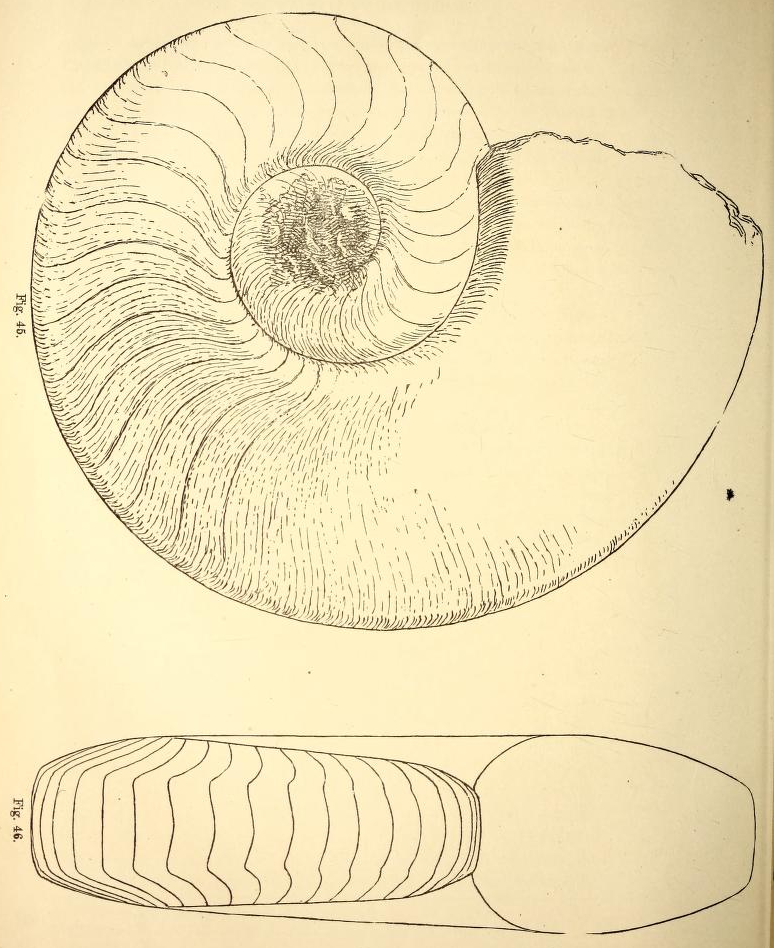
- Domatoceras umbilicatum

Scientific classification
- Kingdom: Animalia
- Phylum: Mollusca
- Class: Cephalopoda
- Subclass: Nautiloidea
- Order: Nautilida
- Superfamily: †Trigonoceratoidea
- Family: †Grypoceratidae; Hyatt in Zittle (1900)

Genera
- †Domatoceras Hyatt, 1891; †Epidomatoceras Turner, 1953; †Grypoceras Hyatt, 1884; †Gryponautilus Mojsisovics, 1902; †Gyronautilinae Zakharov and Shigeta 2000; †Gyronautilus Zakharov & Shigeta, 2000; †Menuthionautilus Collignon, 1933; †Neostenopoceras Zhao, Liang & Zheng, 1978; †Paradomatoceras Delepine, 1937; †Parastenopoceras Ruzhnetzev & Shimanskii, 1954; †Plummeroceras Kummel 1953; †Pselioceras Hyatt, 1884; †Stearoceras Hyatt, 1893; †Titanoceras Hyatt, 1884; †Virgaloceras Schindewolf, 1954; †Xiaohenautilus Xu, 1988

= Grypoceratidae =

Grypoceratidae Temporal range: Carboniferous–Triassic

Extinct family of molluscs

Grypoceratidae is the longest-lived family of the Trigonoceratoidea, or of the near equivalent Centroceratina; members of the Nautilida from the Upper Paleozoic and Triassic.

== Diagnosis ==
The Grypoceratidae are characterized by evolute to involute shells that may have some modification to the venter (the outer rim) varying from flattened to subangular, or bearing a keel. Most are smooth but some have nodes or carinae (auxiliary keels). Sutures generally have distinct ventral and lateral lobes but in some, a ventral saddle. Whorl sections are generally compressed but may be subquadrate to subtrapezoidal or coronate (heart shaped), or slightly depressed dorso-ventrally.

== Phylogeny and genera ==
The Grypoceratidae begin with Epidomatodceras from the Lower Carboniferous (Mississippian), an evolute form with a smooth shell, subquadrate whorl section, and a sharp angular ventral lobe in the suture. Epidomatoceras is followed by Domatoceras, Paradomatoceras, Stearoceras, Stenopoceras, and Titanoceras from the Upper Carboniferous (Pennsylvanian) and Lower Permian.

Domatoceras, Paradomatoceras, and Titanoceras are rather similar in that they are somewhat large, evolute with whorls in contact but not deeply impressed along the inner margin of the whorls, and with straight flanks and flattened venters. Whorl sections vary from strongly compressed side to side with height much greater than width in Paradomatoceras to slightly depressed with height less than width in Titanoceras, with Domatoceras subquadrate in between.

Stearoceras is involute with a depressed subtrapizoidal whorl section and slight ventral and lateral lobes. Stenoporceras is subdiscoidal, flattened laterally, and has a suture with broad lateral lobes and a deep ventral saddle as found in syringonautilids.

Permian genera include Parastenopoceras, a smooth, involute form with a semiellptical whorl section and ventral saddle; Plummeroceras, a form similar to Domatoceras but more evolute and with a deep ventral lobe; Pselioceras, a smooth evolute form with a perforate umbilicus, ovoid whorl section, and suture crossing straight over the venter; and Virgaloceras, also similar to Domatoceras but with a row of nodes on the umbilical wall and a ventral saddle instead of the ventral lobe in the suture. Parastenopoceras, Plummeroceras, and Pselioceras are from the Lower Permian; Virgaloceras is from the Upper Permian.

The last three genera are from the Triassic, none having crossed from the Permian. Grypoceras, given simply a Triassic, is like Domatoceras but tending to be more involute and to have more rounded ventral shoulders. Menuthionautilus from the Lower Triassic has a rapidly expanding, smooth involute shell with a deep dorsal impression, broadly convex flanks and rounded venter, suture with a shallow ventral lobe and siphuncle positioned against the venter. Gryponautilus from the Upper Triassic is broadly involute with a narrowly rounded, keel-like venter at maturity and shallow ventral and lateral lobes in the suture.

All members of the Grypoceratidae have a ventral lobe with the exception of Stenoporceras, Parastenopoceras, and Virgaloceras, which have a ventral saddle instead. The derivation of these three within the Grypoceratidae is uncertain. Stenopoceras or Parastenopoceras is the likely ancestor of the Syringonautilidae from the Triassic.

== Comparison of taxonomies ==
The taxonomy of the Grypoceratidae in the Treatise on Invertebrate Paleontology is straightforward with no attempt to define subdivisions within the family. The taxonomy of the Centroceratina of Shimansky (1962) in Kummel (1964) is more involved. Shimansky first of all divided the Centroceratina into two superfamilies, the Tribolocerataceae with one family and the Centrocerataceae with six families. Among the Centroceratacea the Domatoceratidae and Grypoceratidae (sensu Shimansky) are equivalent to the Gypoceratidae of the Treatise. The Domatoceratidae which include forms with ventral lobes and ventral saddles extends from the Carboniferous barely into the Triassic. The Grypoceratidae of Shimansky contains the Triassic genera of Kummel's larger Grypoceraidae and are derived, probably in the Late Permian, from the more restricted Domatoceratidae.
