= Syringonautilidae =

Syringonautilidae Temporal range: Middle to Late Triassic ~254–205 Ma

Scientific classification
- Kingdom: Animalia
- Phylum: Mollusca
- Class: Cephalopoda
- Subclass: Nautiloidea
- Order: Nautilida
- Superfamily: †Trigonoceratoidea
- Family: †Syringonautilidae; Mojsisovics (1902)

Genera
- See text

Extinct family of nautiloids

Syringonautilidae is a family of Nautiloidea from the middle to late Triassic. Syringonautilidae comprise the last of the Trigonoceratoidea and are the source for the Nautilaceae which continued the Nautiloidea through the Mesozoic and into the Cenozoic right down to the recent. Syringonautilidae is a strictly Triassic family, derived early in the Triassic from the Grypoceratidae.

== Diagnosis ==
The Syringonautilidae are characterized by generally involute shells - early whorls are in view - with broadly to sharply rounded whorl sections and smooth surfaces, except for growth lines and fine wire-like lirae in some forms. The siphuncle is variable in position, and the suture is variably sinuous.

== Genera ==
Five genera are described in the Treatise, Syringonautilus, Clymenonautilus, Juvavionautilus, Oxynautilus, and Syringoceras. Syringonautilus and Syringoceras are known from both the Middle and Upper Triassic; Clymenonautilus, Juvavionautilus, and Oxynautilus only from the Upper Triassic.

Syringonautilus, which has been found in the Alps, on Spitsbergen, in India and Japan has a rapidly expanding evolute shell with a perforate umbilicus and suboval whorl section. The suture has a faint ventral saddle and shallow lateral lobes. The siphuncle is subcentral. The surface is ornamented with fine lirae. Syringoceras, found in Europe, on the island of Timur in Indonesia, and in western North America (Calif and Nev) is like Syringonautilus except that the siphuncle is near marginal.

Clymenonautilus, first of the strictly Upper Triassic genera, is evolute with a perforate umbilicus and deep dorsal impression when the whorl envelops a third of the previous. The whorl section is higher than wide with flattened flanks and rounded ventral and umbilical shoulders. The suture is transverse across the venter and has deep, tongue-like lobes on either side. The inner whorls are covered with fine lirae, and the outer ones are smooth. The position of the siphuncle is unknown. Clymenoceras comes from Europe.

Juvavionautilus, has a widely umbilicate, slowly expanding, evolute, perforate shell in which the flanks converge on a rounded to flattened venter so that the maximum width is just central of the umbilical shoulders. The suture includes a ventral saddle and broad lateral lobes. In some, there is a secondary ventral lobe. The siphuncle is subcentral. Juvavionautilus comes from Europe and Timur.

Oxynautilus, differs from the rest in that it has an involute, compressed lenticular shell with a narrow or acute (angular) venter which may or may not have a keel. The whorl section is much higher than wide with the maximum width slightly ventral of the umbilical shoulders. The suture is sinuous, including a narrowly rounded to angular ventral saddle and broad lateral lobes. The siphuncle is subcentral. Oxynautilus has been found in Europe in the Alps, in California in North America and in the Payandé Formation in Tolima, Colombia.

== Distribution ==
Fossils of Syringonautilidae have been found in Austria, China, Colombia, Hungary, Italy, the Russian Federation, and the United States (California, Nevada).
