= Discitoceras =

Discitoceras Temporal range: Lower Carboniferous

Scientific classification
- Domain: Eukaryota
- Kingdom: Animalia
- Phylum: Mollusca
- Class: Cephalopoda
- Subclass: Nautiloidea
- Order: Nautilida
- Family: †Trigonoceratidae
- Genus: †Discitoceras; Hyatt, 1884

Extinct genus of molluscs

Discitoceras is an extinct genus of nautiloids from the Lower Carboniferous.
