= Emil Tietze =

Austrian geologist (1845–1931)

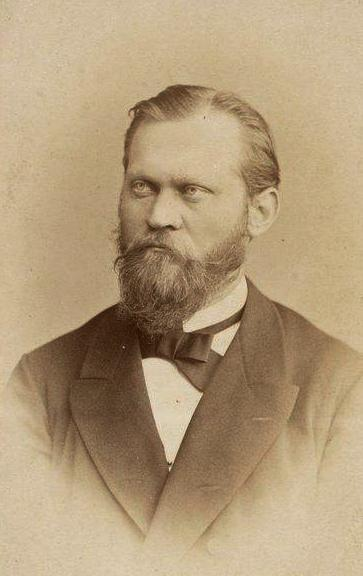
Emil Tietze (1845-1931)

Emil Ernst August Tietze (15 June 1845, Breslau – 4 March 1931, Vienna) was an Austrian geologist.

He received his education at the Universities of Breslau and Tübingen. Afterwards, he joined the Geological Survey of Austria (1870), an agency that Tietze would be associated with until his retirement in 1918. In 1902 he became its director.

Primarily known for his geological surveys of Eastern Europe (the Carpathian Mountains, Galicia, Bosnia-Herzegovina and Montenegro), he also conducted important research involving the stratigraphy and tectonics in the Elburz Mountains of Persia. Tietze was interested in the processes of erosion that were responsible for modern-day land formations, in particular karst topography.

Tietze's wife, Rosa von Hauer, was the daughter of another notable Austrian geologist, Franz Ritter von Hauer. Their son, Heinrich Franz Friedrich Tietze, became a mathematician.

== Published works ==
- Ueber die devonischen Schichten von Ebersdorf unweit Neurode in der grafschaft Glatz, 1870 - On the Devonian strata of Ebersdorf near Neurode in the county of Glatz.
- Beiträge zur geologie persiens: Gesammelte schriften, 1877 - Contribution to the geology of Persia, collected writings.
- Geologische Übersichtskarte von Bosnien-Hercegovina, 1880 - Geological map of Bosnia-Hercegovina.
- Grundlinien der Geologie von Bosnien-Hercegovina, 1880 - Baseline geology of Bosnia-Hercegovina.
- Beiträge zur Geologie von Galizien, 1883 - Contribution to the geology of Galicia.
- Geologische Uebersicht on Montenegro, 1884 - Geological overview of Montenegro.
- Eine Reise nach dem Ural, 1898 - A journey to the Ural Mountains.
- Franz v. Hauer: sein Lebensgang und seine wissenschaftliche Thätigkeit; ein Beitrag zur Geschichte der österreichischen Geologie, 1900 - Franz von Hauer, his life's work and scientific activity.
