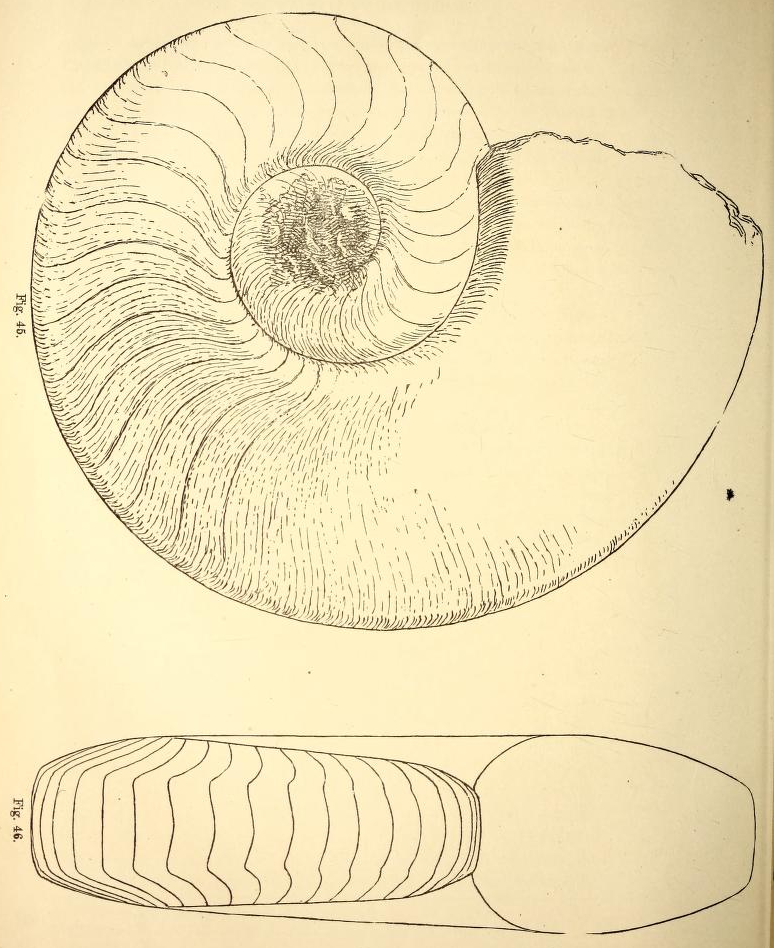
- Domatoceras umbilicatum

Scientific classification
- Kingdom: Animalia
- Phylum: Mollusca
- Class: Cephalopoda
- Subclass: Nautiloidea
- Order: Nautilida
- Superfamily: †Trigonoceratoidea; Kummel (1964)

Families
- Trigonoceratidae; Centroceratidae; Grypoceratidae; Syringonautilidae

Synonyms
- Trigonocerataceae

= Trigonoceratoidea =

Trigonoceratoidea Temporal range: Late Devonian–Late Triassic

Extinct superfamily of nautiloids

The Trigonoceratoidea are a superfamily within the Nautilida that ranged from the Devonian to the Triassic, thought to have contained the source for the Nautilaceae in which Nautilus is found.

Trigonoceratoidea are characterized by open-spiraled, gyroconic, to closed, nautiliconic shells in which the Whorl section is quadrate in primitive forms; the venter typically narrow to acute, the dorsum broad. In some advanced forms, the venter may become concave or broad and rounded, and in some, the surfaces may be strongly lirate.

== Classification and phylogeny ==
The Trigonoceratoidea are based on the family Trigonoceratidae of Alpheus Hyatt, 1884, with which other phylogenetically related families are combined, and are equivalent to the abandoned Centroceratida of Flower in Flower and Kümmel 1950, and to the Centroceratina of Shimanskiy 1957, revised to the Centrocerataceae, Shimanskiy 1962.

The Trigonoceratoidea combine four families, the type, Trigonoceratidae, along with the Centroceratidae, Grypoceratidae, and Syringonautilidae. Phylogenetic study and age show that the Centroceratidae are the root stock in spite of having been first recognized 16 years after the Trigonoceratidae were first described.

The Centroceratidae gave rise to the Trigonoceratidae and Grypoceratidae in the early Mississippian, while continuing until the very Early Permian. The Trigonoceratidae which ranged into the Permian left no descendants. The Grypoceratidae which ranged almost to the end of the Triassic gave rise to the Triassic Syringonautilidae. The Syringonautilidae, in turn, are the source for the Nautilidae (Nautilaceae) which contain the genus Nautilus.

=== Families ===
The Trigonoceratidae, type family, named by Hyatt, 1884, are loosely coiled to evolute, with oval to subquadrate, compressed to depressed whorl sections, and generally with longitudinal ridges or lirae. Sutures are typically slightly sinuous; the siphuncle small, subcentral, and orthochoanitic. In all the umbilicus is open and perforate. It includes some 17 genera.

The Centroceratidae, ancestral stock, proposed by Hyatt in 1900, consist of gyroconic to evolute and involute shells that have a quadrangular cross section in which the venter is much narrower that the dorsum, the venereal and umbilical shoulders usually angular, the flanks flattened and converging on the venter. Sutures form lobes on the sides and venter but are transverse across the dorsum. The siphuncle is tubular, orthochoanitic, and close to but not on the ventral margin. It includes some six genera.

The Grypoceratidae, predominant stock, established by Hyatt in 1900, are characterized by generally smooth, compressed, evolute to involute shells with the venter flattened to subangular. Ornamenation is not common, but some forms bear nodes or keels. Sutures have distinct ventral and lateral lobes. The siphuncle, which is narrow and tubular, is variable in position. It includes about 13 genera.

Shimanskiy separated the Domatoceratidae, typified by the Permian Domatoceras, from the Grypoceratidae in the Treatise, leaving the Grypoceratidae for mostly earlier forms.

The Syringonautilidae, Triassic offshoots named by Johann August Georg Edmund Mojsisovics von Mojsvar, 1902, gave rise to the Nautilaceae (Nautilina); containing five genera, they have generally smooth, involute shells with slightly sinuous sutures and a variably positioned siphuncle.
