= Johann August Georg Edmund Mojsisovics von Mojsvar =

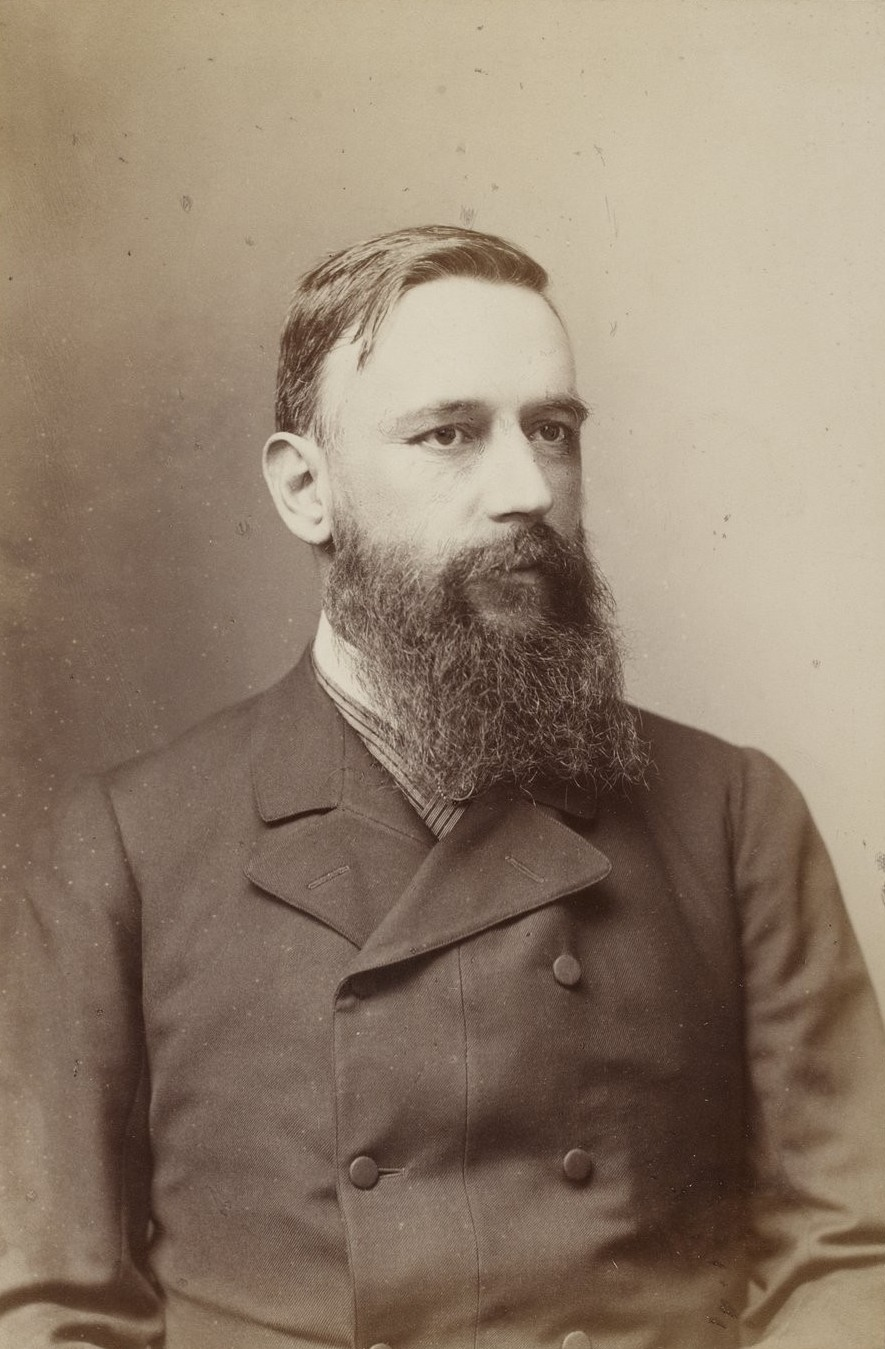
- Johann August Georg Edmund Mojsisovics Edler von Mojsvár, 1886
- Born: 18 October 1839; Vienna, Austrian Empire
- Died: 2 October 1907 (aged 67); Mallnitz, Austria-Hungary
- Occupations: Geologist, palaeontologist

Johann August Georg Edmund (Ödön) Mojsisovics von Mojsvár (18 October 1839 – 2 October 1907), commonly known as Edmund von Mojsisovics was an Austro-Hungarian geologist and palaeontologist.

== Biography ==
Mojsisovics was born in Vienna as the son of a Hungarian surgeon Georg (György) Mojsisovics von Mojsvár (1799–1860) of Lutheran faith who was ennobled in 1858. He studied law in Vienna University, taking his doctorate degree in 1864, and in 1867 he entered the Geological Institute, becoming chief geologist in 1870 and vice-director in 1892. He retired in 1900 and died at Mallnitz on 2 October 1907.

== Works ==
Mojsvar paid special attention to the Cephalopoda of the Austrian Triassic, and his publications include:

- Das Gebirge um Hallstatt (1873, 1876).
- Die Dolomit-Riffe von Südtirol und Venetien (1878–1880).
- Grundlinien der Geologie von Bosnien-Herzegowina (1880), with Emil Tietze and Alexander Bittner.
- Die Cephalopoden der mediterranen Triasprovinz (1882).
- Die cephalopoden der Hallstätter Kalke (1873, 1902).
- Beiträge zur Kenntniss der obertriadischen Cephalopodenfaunen des Himalaya (1896).

With Melchior Neumayr (1845–1890) he conducted the Beiträge zur Paläontologie und Geologie Österreich-Ungarns (Contributions to the Palaeontology and Geology of Austria-Hungary). In 1862, with Paul Grohmann and Dr. Guido von Sommaruga, he founded the Österreichischer Alpenverein (Austrian Alpine Club), and he also took part in establishing the German Alpine Club (Deutscher Alpenverein), which combined with the former in 1873.

He is responsible for naming the stage on the geologic time scale known as the "Carnian", after the Carnic Alps, in 1869.
