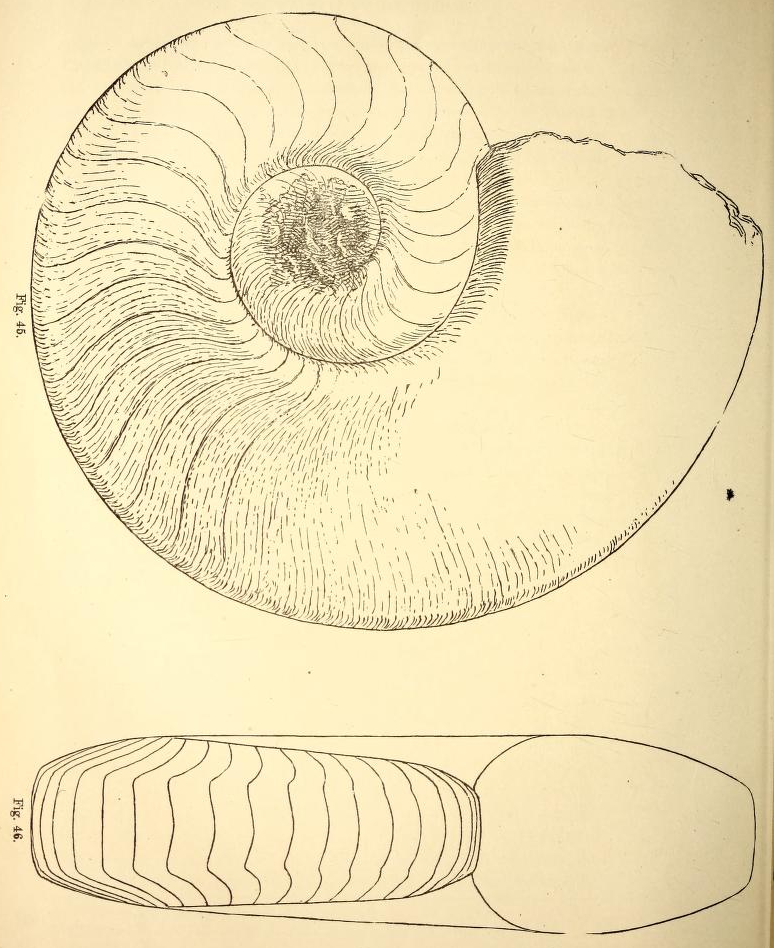
- Domatoceras umbilicatum

Scientific classification
- Kingdom: Animalia
- Phylum: Mollusca
- Class: Cephalopoda
- Subclass: Nautiloidea
- Order: Nautilida
- Family: †Grypoceratidae
- Genus: †Domatoceras; Hyatt, 1891

Species
- Domatoceras atypicum Shimansky, 1965; Domatoceras collinsvillense Niko & Mapes, 2016; Domatoceras fredericksi Kruglov, 1928; Domatoceras gardi Murphy; Domatoceras gigas; Domatoceras guangxiense Zhao & al., 1978; Domatoceras hexagonum; Domatoceras highlandense; Domatoceras hunicum; Domatoceras inostranzewi; Domatoceras kleihegei; Domatoceras latum Shimanskiy, 1967; Domatoceras magister Shimanskiy, 1967; Domatoceras mattoonense Tucker, 1976; Domatoceras moorei Miller, Dunbar, & Condra; Domatoceras mosquense; Domatoceras northropi Miller & Unklesbay; Domatoceras ogatsuense Ehiro & Takizawa, 1989; Domatoceras parallelum; Domatoceras podolskense; Domatoceras texanum Tucker & Mapes, 1978; Domatoceras tulense; Domatoceras umbilicatus Hyatt; Domatoceras walteri Miller & Unklesbay, 1942; Domatoceras wortheni Tucker, 1976

= Domatoceras =

Domatoceras Temporal range: Pennsylvanian–Permian

Extinct genus of nautiloids

Domatoceras is a nautiloid genus and member of the Grypoceratidae from the Pennsylvanian and Permian with a wide spread distribution.

The shell of Domatoceras is evolute, coiled with whorls touching but not overlapping, some growing to be moderately large. Whorl section subquadrate, higher than wide. Sides essentially straight to slightly bowed and slightly convergent on a broad slightly arched venter on the outer rim. Shoulder are narrow but rounded. Chambers are short but lengthen slightly before the mature living chamber, septa close spaced, sutures form broad shallow lateral and ventral lobes and sharp ventro-lateral saddles. The dorsum in slightly impressed (indented) where it rides over the previous whorl. The siphuncle is subventral, located between the center and the ventral margin and, where known, slightly expanded so as to be longitudinally spindle shaped.
