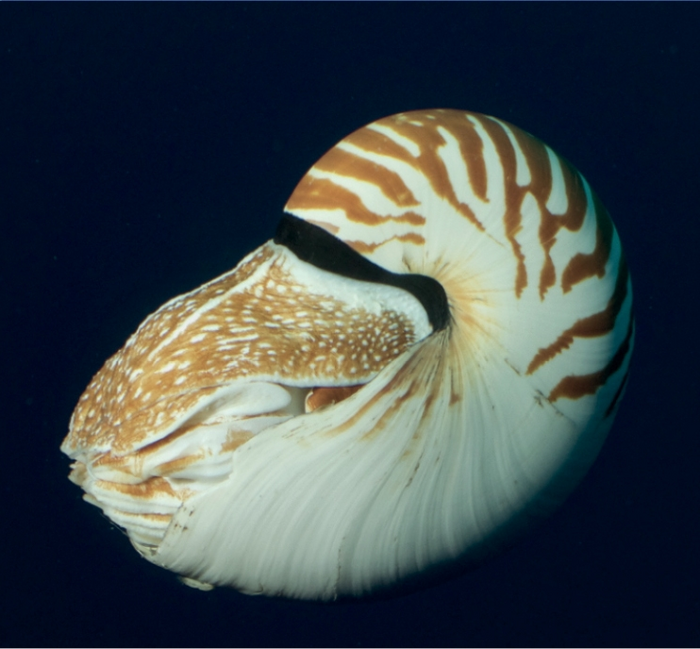

Conservation status
- Vulnerable (IUCN 3.1)

Scientific classification
- Kingdom: Animalia
- Phylum: Mollusca
- Class: Cephalopoda
- Subclass: Nautiloidea
- Order: Nautilida
- Family: Nautilidae
- Genus: Nautilus
- Species: N. vitiensis

Binomial name
- Nautilus vitiensis Barord et al., 2023

= Nautilus vitiensis =

Species of cephalopod

Nautilus vitiensis is a species of nautilus native to the waters of Fiji. It was described as a separate species in 2023. An interesting discovery regarding this new species was revealed by the geographic component of this species taxonomy. This species, along with two other newly discovered species, exist in large (Larger than the Pre-discovered species) island groups separated by at least 200 km of deep water from other Nautilus populations. Other Nautilus species shells implode at depths greater than 800m, leading this discovery of three species to stand out from pre-existing Nautilus species.

== Morphology ==
N. vitiensis is morphologically similar not only to N. pompilius but also the two other species discovered alongside it (N. samoaensis and N. vanuatuensis). Despite this, it is recognized as a distinct species due to sufficient morphological differences.

=== Shell ===
N. vitiensis typically displays less pigmentation on its shell than other species of nautilus, with only about 15–30% of the shell covered. This reduced pigmentation may be due to the species’s deep-water habitat. This is greater than the pigmentation in N. pompilius, but less than in the two other species described above. Two stripe pattern morphs have been observed in this species. The first variation has stripes that extend from the venter (the edge when viewing the shell laterally) to the umbilicus (the center) with no breaks. The second variation has stripes from the venter that stop before reaching the umbilicus, leaving a white patch (an area without pigmentation). Both variations of the stripe pattern are simple and unbranching, making them among the simplest stripe patterns on extant nautiloids.

=== Size ===
N. vitiensis is a relatively small species of nautilus; even the largest specimens are smaller than the smallest mature individuals of N. pompilius. They are also generally smaller than N. samoaensis and N. vanuatuensis, though size ranges overlap. Among 35 measured individuals, the largest shell was 165 mm (6.5 in) and the smallest was 137 mm (5.4 in).

== Habitat and Distribution ==
N. vitiensis is found off the coast of Viti Levu, Fiji, particularly near Suva Harbour and Pacific Harbour. Specimens have been collected at depths of 200–400 m (656–1,312 ft).
