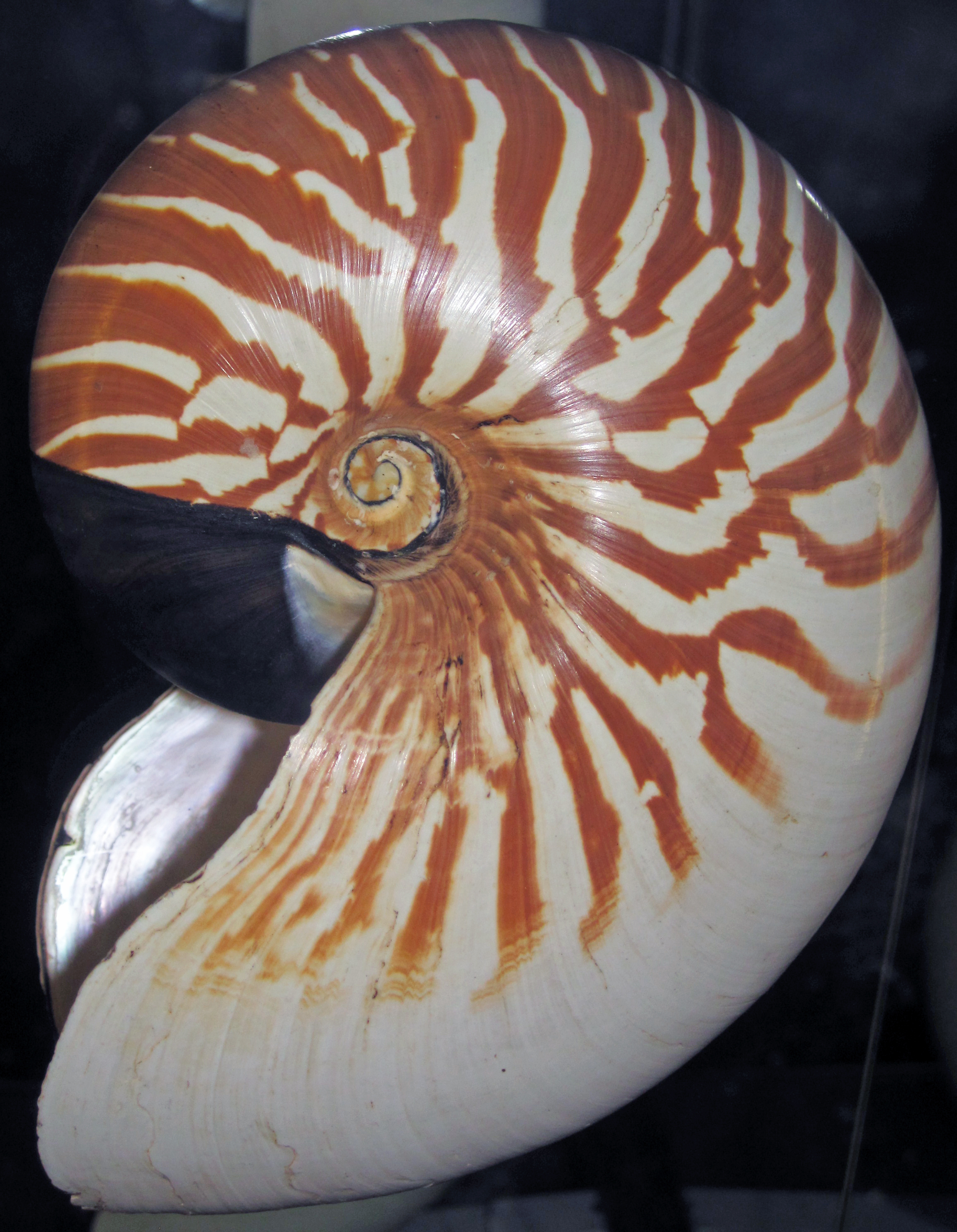

Conservation status
- CITES Appendix II

Scientific classification
- Kingdom: Animalia
- Phylum: Mollusca
- Class: Cephalopoda
- Subclass: Nautiloidea
- Order: Nautilida
- Family: Nautilidae
- Genus: Nautilus
- Species: N. stenomphalus

Binomial name
- Nautilus stenomphalus Sowerby II, 1848

= Nautilus stenomphalus =

Species of mollusc

Nautilus stenomphalus, also known as the white-patch nautilus, is a species of nautilus native to the Great Barrier Reef. N. stenomphalus is very similar to N. pompilius and may in fact represent a subspecies. It is separated by the absence of a thickened callus and the presence of white patches in the umbilical and shoulder regions of the shell. The sheaths of this species have scalloped edges compared with the smooth sheaths of N. pompilius. N. stenomphalus also differs slightly in hood ornamentation. The shell is usually up to around 180 mm in diameter, although the largest specimen ever recorded measured 201 mm.

== Distribution ==
Nautilus stenomphalus are pelagic molluscs belonging to the Nautilidae cephalopod family predominantly found across coral reefs along the Indo-Pacific region. N. stenomphalus is specifically known to inhabit the Great Barrier Reef and other parts of the eastern coast of Australia. Its range extends as far north as Lizard Island, however, specimens caught here were sometimes intergrade forms with N. pompilius traits, further supporting the theory that they are subspecies rather than a species complex.

== Description ==
N. stenomphalus are scavengers that utilize two chemosensory rhinophores, rod-shaped structures located below the eye, to locate dead meat and consuming low-nutrients from the ocean floor. They dwell in darker waters in depths up to 300 meters, though moving towards shallower waters to scavenge at night. Though possessing primitive eyes, N. stenomphalus predominantly rely on chemoreception in order to locate food in their habitat. N. stenomphalus share many morphological similarities with its close relative N. pompilius such as "zigzag" shell color pattern.

== Morphology ==
=== Sexual dimorphism ===
N. stenomphalus express sexual dimorphism, with mature males predominantly being larger and are significantly more abundant than females.

=== Sensory organs ===
N. stenomphalus possess digital tentacles which are able to detect chemosensation, though its preocular and postocular tentacles are more sensitive and also are believed to function for tactile purposes. When perceiving odor stimulation through its rhinophore, its digital tentacles are often spread out laterally in a "cone of search" to identify the source of the stimulus. Nautilus expresses this distinct pattern of behavior when attempting to locate the source of an odor, swaying its tentacles in a cone shape to detect and move towards the substrate. N. stenomphalus also rely on olfaction through rhinophores, chemosensory structures that are similar to other olfactory organs expressed by other members in the cephalopod family such as Octopus. Rhinophores are situated inside the Nautilus and are exposed to the external environment through pores located below the eyes.

== Taxonomy and evolution ==
Members of the Nautilus genus are believed to have evolved to their current form between seven and ten million years ago, though some estimates place their divergence from their Mesozoic ancestors as early as 40 million years ago. Though Nautilus stenomphalus is classified as an individual species compared to its much more abundant relative Nautilus pompilius, closer DNA analysis of the relationship between N. stenomphalus and N. pompilius reveals that they cannot be identified as independent lineages due to their shared DNA positions and synapomorphies. Moreover, stenomphalus and pompilius hybrid species exhibit less than one percent deviation from the DNA sequences of both parent species. Phylogenetic reconstructions identify both N. stenomphalus and N. pompilius as belonging to the Australian/Papua-New Guinean clade, providing insight that both species may have arisen from sympatric speciation. Few studies have sought to identify the DNA sequence differences between the species, moreover the genetic distinction of N. stenomphalus and N. pompilius remains unresolved.

== Phylogeny ==
Due to the striking similarities between Nautilus and its subspecies from their identical DNA sequence sections and synapomorphies, there is significant evidence to suggest that Nautilus pompilius exhibits phenotypic plasticity. Namely, Nautilus subspecies identification through taxonomic features is difficult between populations as many features that were thought to be unique may overlap across different Nautilus populations. Other subspecies such as N. belauensis, N. macromphalus, and N. scrobiculatus are regionally bound and known to inhabit areas around Palau, New Caledonia, and Papua-New Guinea respectively. N. pompilius represents the type species as it is the most common and widely distributed member of the Nautilus family, and is used as a point of comparison to other Nautilus members. Phylogenetic analysis conducted utilizing DNA and morphological data between members suggests that N. pompilius represents a paraphyletic group of Nautilus members, though not including N. scrobiculatus.
