= White patch =

White patch may refer to:

- White Patch, Queensland, an Australian locality
- Chiomara asychis, a butterfly
- Nautilus stenomphalus, the white-patch nautilus

== See also ==
- Vitiligo
