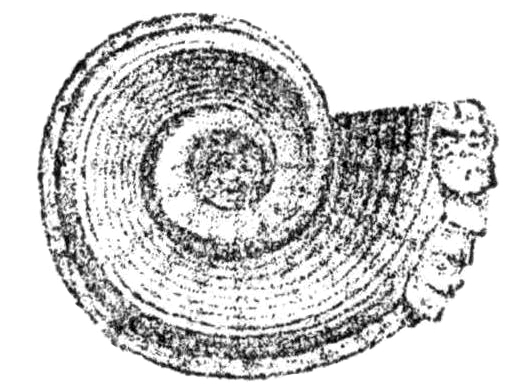

Scientific classification
- Kingdom: Animalia
- Phylum: Mollusca
- Class: Cephalopoda
- Subclass: Nautiloidea
- Order: Nautilida
- Family: Nautilidae
- Genus: Nautilus
- Species: †N. clarkanus

Binomial name
- †Nautilus clarkanus Hall, 1858

= Nautilus clarkanus =

"Nautilus" clarkanus Temporal range: Carboniferous

Extinct species of mollusc

"Nautilus" clarkanus is an extinct species of nautiloid. It lived during the Lower Carboniferous. Fossil specimens have been uncovered in the Spergen Hill Limestone formation of Indiana.
