= Nautilus praepompilius =

Nautilus praepompilius Temporal range: Late Paleocene–Oligocene

Scientific classification
- Kingdom: Animalia
- Phylum: Mollusca
- Class: Cephalopoda
- Subclass: Nautiloidea
- Order: Nautilida
- Family: Nautilidae
- Genus: Nautilus
- Species: N. praepompilius

Binomial name
- Nautilus praepompilius Shimansky, 1957

Extinct species of mollusc

Nautilus praepompilius is an extinct species of nautilus. It lived from the Late Paleocene through Oligocene epochs. The first fossil specimens discovered in the Late Eocene to Oligocene-aged Chegan Formation of Kazakhstan: an additional, older specimen was found in the Late or Latest Paleocene-aged Pebble Point Formation in Victoria, Australia. N. praepompilius has been grouped into a single genus together with extant species based on their shared shell characters. It is morphologically closest to N. pompilius, hence the name. The nepionic constriction shows that the hatching size was approximately 23 mm, close to that for N. pompilius (around 26 mm). N. praepompilius, along with aff. N. cookanus fossils from the late Eocene Hoko River Formation in Washington state are the oldest occurrences of the genus.
