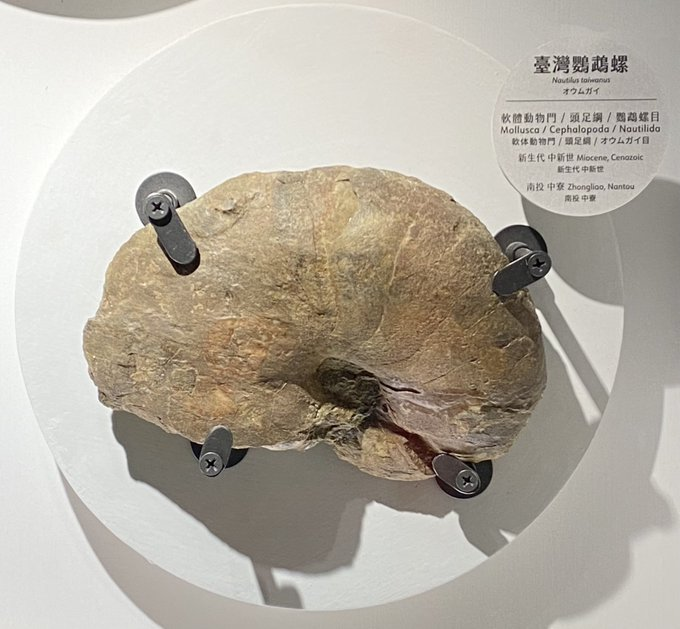

Scientific classification
- Domain: Eukaryota
- Kingdom: Animalia
- Phylum: Mollusca
- Class: Cephalopoda
- Subclass: Nautiloidea
- Order: Nautilida
- Family: Nautilidae
- Genus: Nautilus
- Species: N. taiwanus

Binomial name
- Nautilus taiwanus (Huang, 2002)

Synonyms
- Kummelonautilus taiwanum Huang, 2002; Kummeloceras taiwanum (Huang, 2002); Sinautilus taiwanicus Tao & Hu, 2005 (Missp.)

= Nautilus taiwanus =

Nautilus taiwanus Temporal range: Miocene

Extinct species of mollusc

Nautilus taiwanus is an extinct species of nautiloid, the fossils of which were found in the Shimen and Houdongkeng formations, of the early Miocene, in Nantou County, Taiwan.

The species was once classified as Kummelonautilus taiwanum, but reclassified under Nautilus taiwanus in 2022, when it was recognised as the northernmost fossil record of the genus Nautilus in the Neogene Indo-Pacific.

== Discovery and research history ==
Most of the Nautilus fossils in Taiwan were found in Nantou County. The first Nautilus fossil was recorded by Ichiro Hayasaka in 1936, which was found in the present-day Ganzilin, Guoxing Township Nantou County, and was considered to belong to the Miocene strata.

In 2002, a Nautilus fossil from Shimen formation in Zhongliao Township in Nantou was classified as a new species, Kummelonautilus taiwanum, but it was not clearly distinguished from other nautilus groups. In another study in 2005, the identification characteristics of Kummelonautilus taiwanum were provided, but it still provided no diagnostic autapomorphy to distinguish it from other nautilus species.

In 2022, a study re-examined the holotype and paratype, along with the new specimens found in the early Miocene Houdongkeng formation in Qiangou, Guoxing Township, Nantou County, Taiwan, suggesting that Kummelonautilus taiwanum belongs to the genus Nautilus. Further, as the morphological evolution of the cephalopod shell is conservative, the authors also suggest that the nautilus fossils from the Indo-Pacific region should be grouped into one genus rather than separate genera. However, due to the lack or incomplete preservation of Neogene specimens of the genus Nautilus, there are currently no morphological characteristics that can distinguish the type specimen of Nautilus taiwanus from other Nautilus species in Miocene Indonesia, Australia, or extant species. Therefore, "Nautilus taiwanus" is considered as a provisional name for this species until further comparative studies are conducted to clarify its taxonomic status.

Nautilus taiwanus is presently considered to be the northernmost fossil record of the genus Nautilus in the Indo-Pacific region in the Neogene. A hypothesis suggests that the regional extinction of nautiluses in the Cenozoic was associated with the occurrence of Pinnipedia and cetaceans, and that the record of nautiluses declined significantly or even disappeared after the occurrence of these marine mammals in some areas.
