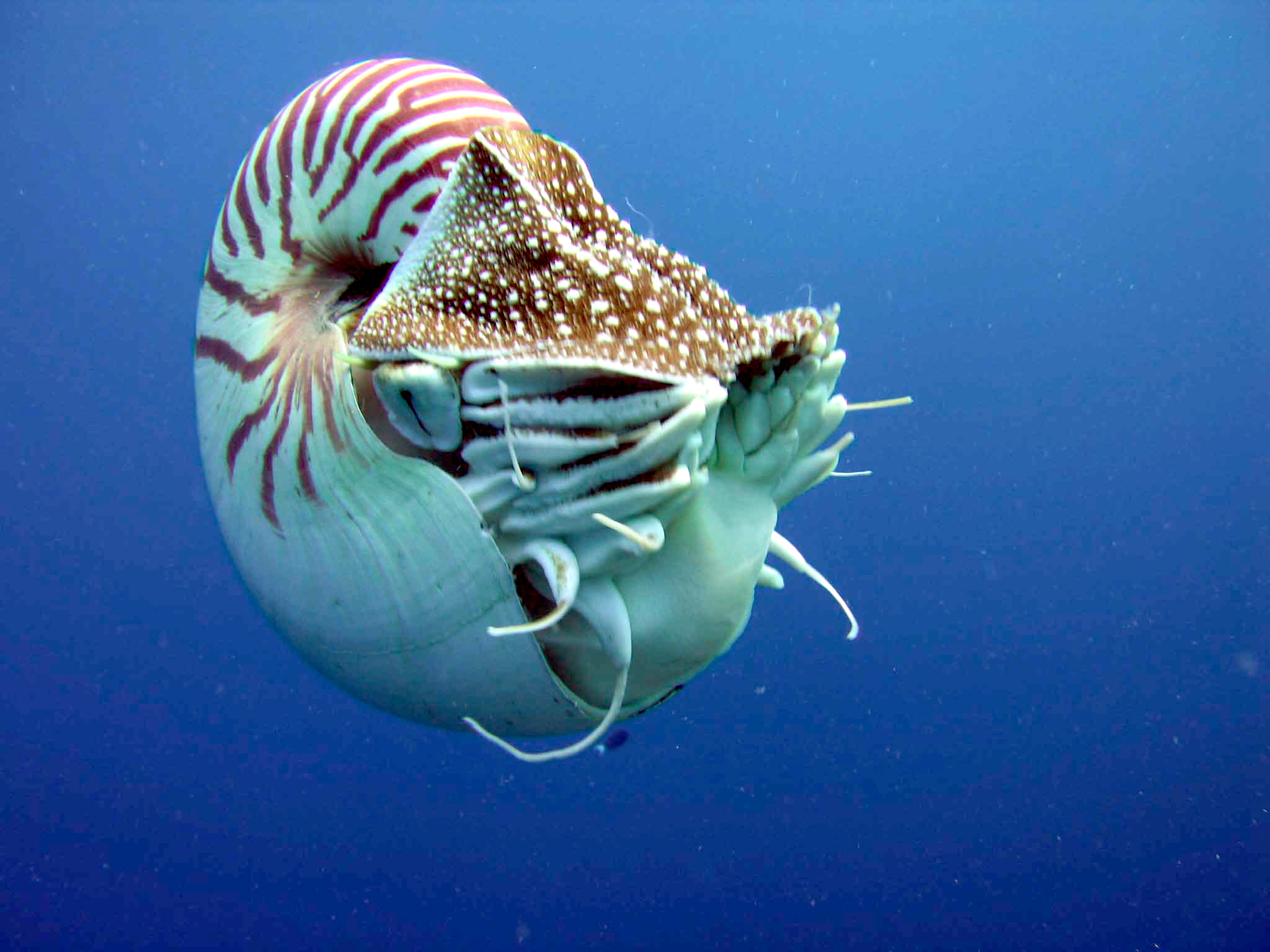
- Nautilus belauensis in Palau

Conservation status
- Near Threatened (IUCN 3.1)
- CITES Appendix II

Scientific classification
- Kingdom: Animalia
- Phylum: Mollusca
- Class: Cephalopoda
- Subclass: Nautiloidea
- Order: Nautilida
- Family: Nautilidae
- Genus: Nautilus
- Species: N. belauensis

Binomial name
- Nautilus belauensis Saunders, 1981

= Nautilus belauensis =

Species of cephalopods known as the Palau nautilus

The Palau nautilus (Nautilus belauensis) is a nautiloid mainly found off of Palau in the Western Carolines. It can be found on fore reef slopes, at depths of 95-504 m (311-1,653'), though typically preferring a range of 150-300 m (492-984'), where water temperatures stay around 16.6 °C (61.88°F) and do not go much lower than 9.4 °C (48.92°F). N. belauensis are highly mobile, epibenthic scavengers and opportunistic predators which rely mostly on scent for finding food. They are active both diurnally and nocturnally within their preferred depth ranges, although most shallow-water incursions are, generally, nocturnal events that coincide with greatly diminished fish activities.

== Taxonomic Status ==
Nautilus belauensis is not widely recognized as a valid species. The World Register of Marine Species (WoRMS) describes it as taxon inquirendum, indicating that its taxonomic status is uncertain and requires further investigation. This uncertainty is due to insufficient morphological differentiation between N. belauensis and other extant species of Nautilus.

== Anatomy ==
N. belauensis' shell is similar to that of N. pompilius, but it is distinguished by its larger mean mature shell diameter and shell weight. Its shell characteristic pattern consists of bifurcating brown to red stripes that extend from the umbilicus to the venter without coalescing across the venter with delicate, longitudinally crenulated ridges that produce a distinctive, concentrically lirate pattern. It can also be distinguished from N. pompilius by its inwardly sloping umbilical walls and evenly rounded umbilical shoulder. The shell is also distinguishable by the presence of longitudinally crenulated shell sculpture, and a broadly triangular central rachidian radular tooth and a lack of umbilical callus. Fresh shells were also found to implode at 680–789m depth equivalent pressures.

== Development ==
At the immature/juvenile stage, the Palau nautilus' shell is covered in colored bands. Its body chamber is covered by a thick, gelatinous, and slippery periostracum. As it reaches the sub mature stage, most of its body chamber is white but with thin margins. However, it still lacks a black layer that develops upon maturity.

Maturity in the Palau nautilus is reached when there is a rapid decrease in growth rate until there is no additional growth. The body chamber shell wall thickens with deposition of a black layer along the apertural margin and the accentuation of the hyponomic and ocular sinuses. The exterior body chamber lacks colour banding. The last septum is thickened but has a reduced volume in the final chamber. There are usually around 35 septa in the shell. The maximum observed range in shell sizes extends from 180 mm to 239 mm in diameter with the umbilical diameter taking up 16% of the shell diameter. The Palau nautilus can live for 5–10 years after reaching maturity and have a life span that may range beyond 20 years.

== Behaviour ==
The Palau nautilus is able to traverse across a wide range of temperatures and great lateral distances in short periods of time. It is also able to survive in warm water up to 30 °C for tens of hours up to several days. It typically migrates from deeper water into shallower water following sunset and returns to the deep before sunlight. It is also able to travel an average distance from 0.45 km per day over 322 days up to 0.8 km per day over 5 days.

== Gallery ==
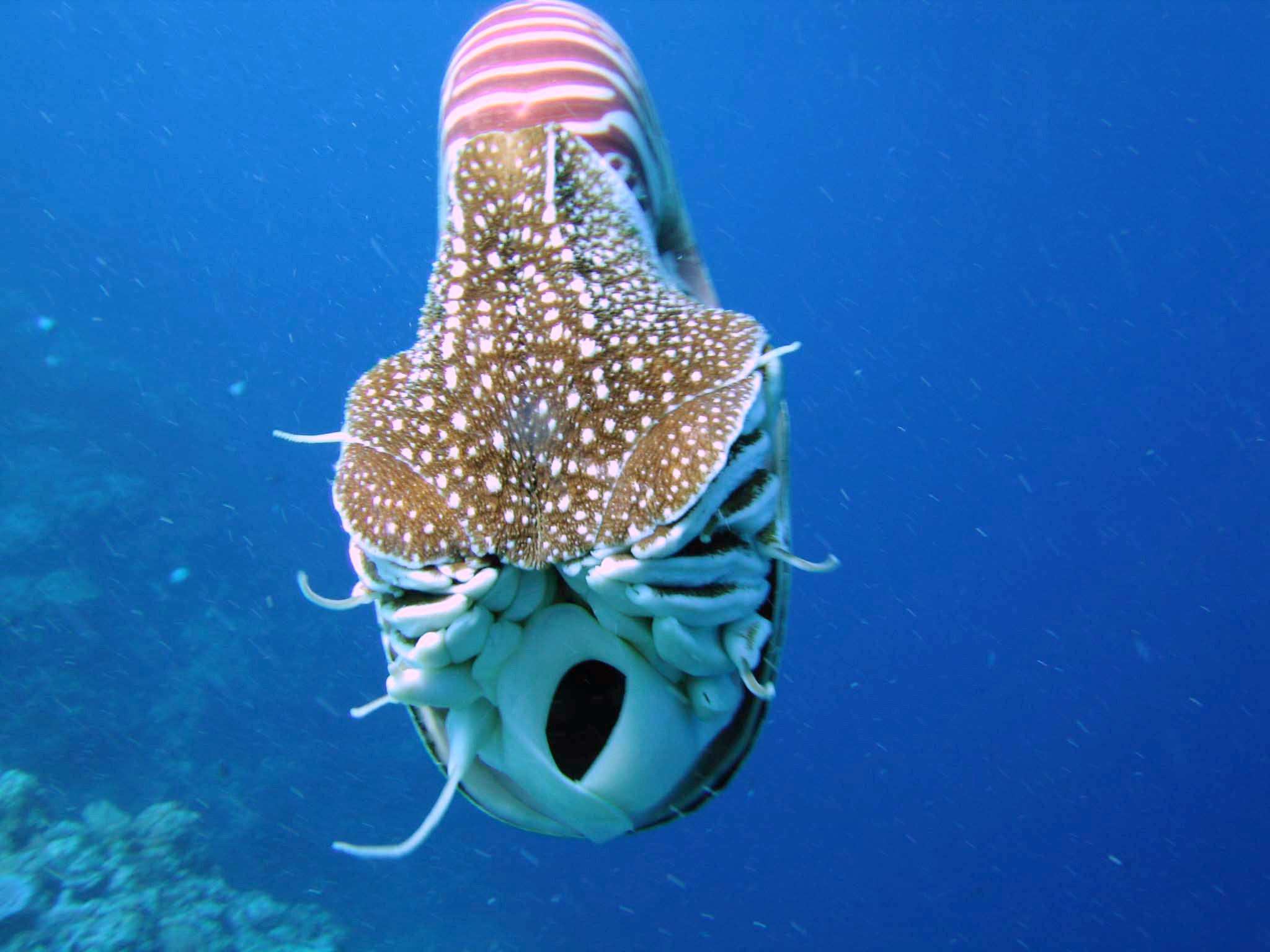
N. belauensis seen from the front, showing the hyponome

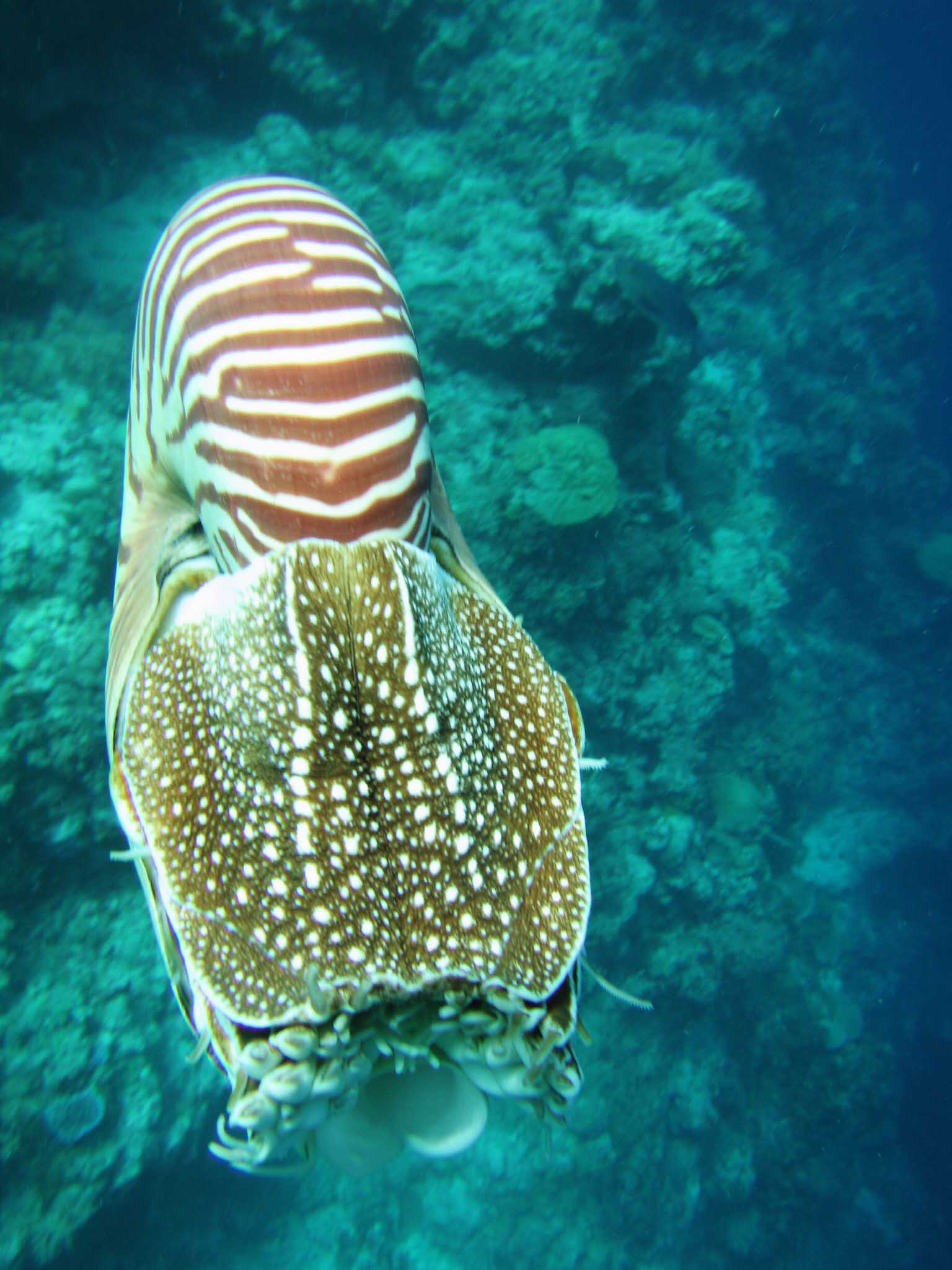
Palau nautilus viewed from above

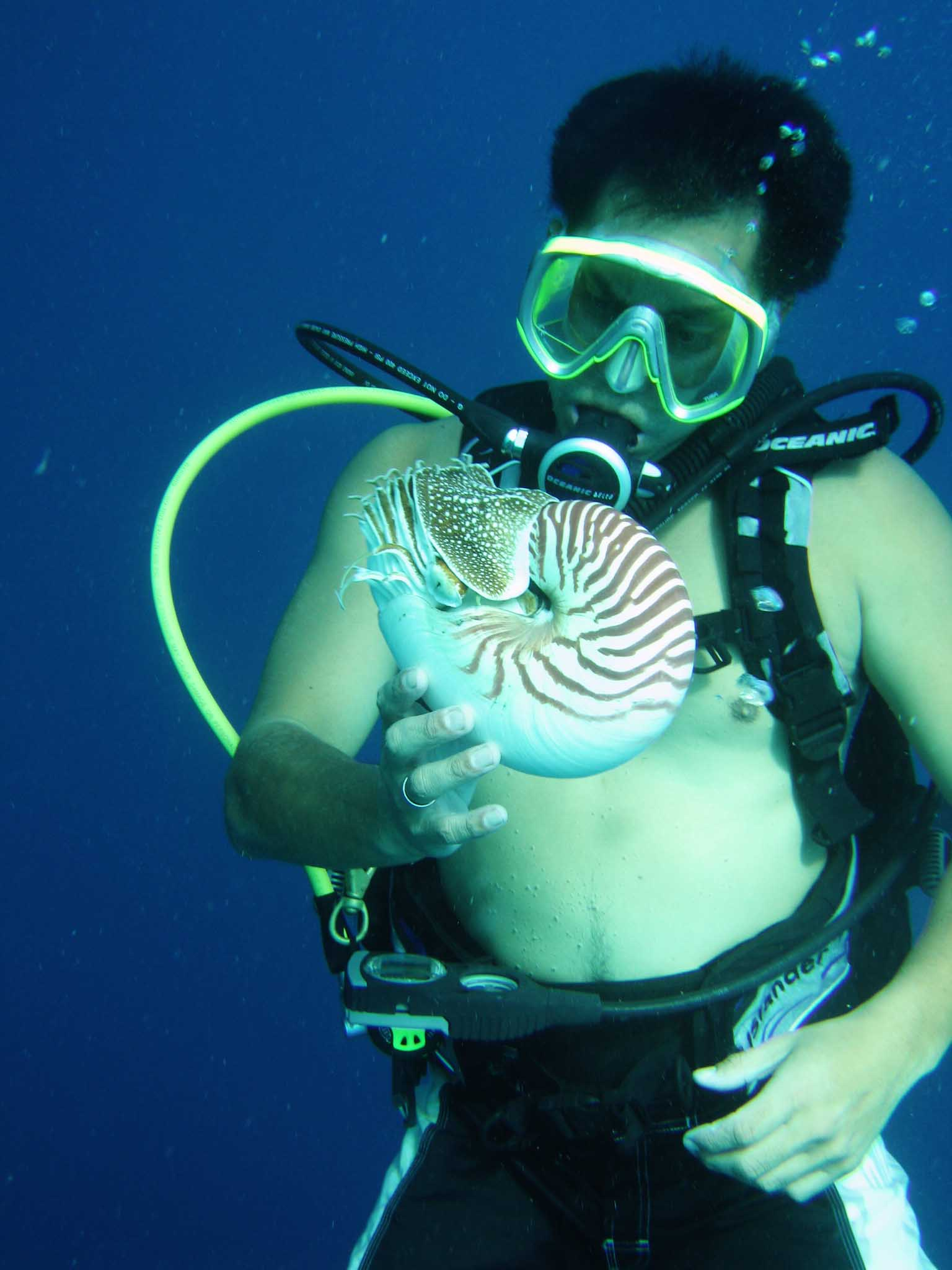
Diver with Palau nautilus showing size of a typical captured specimen
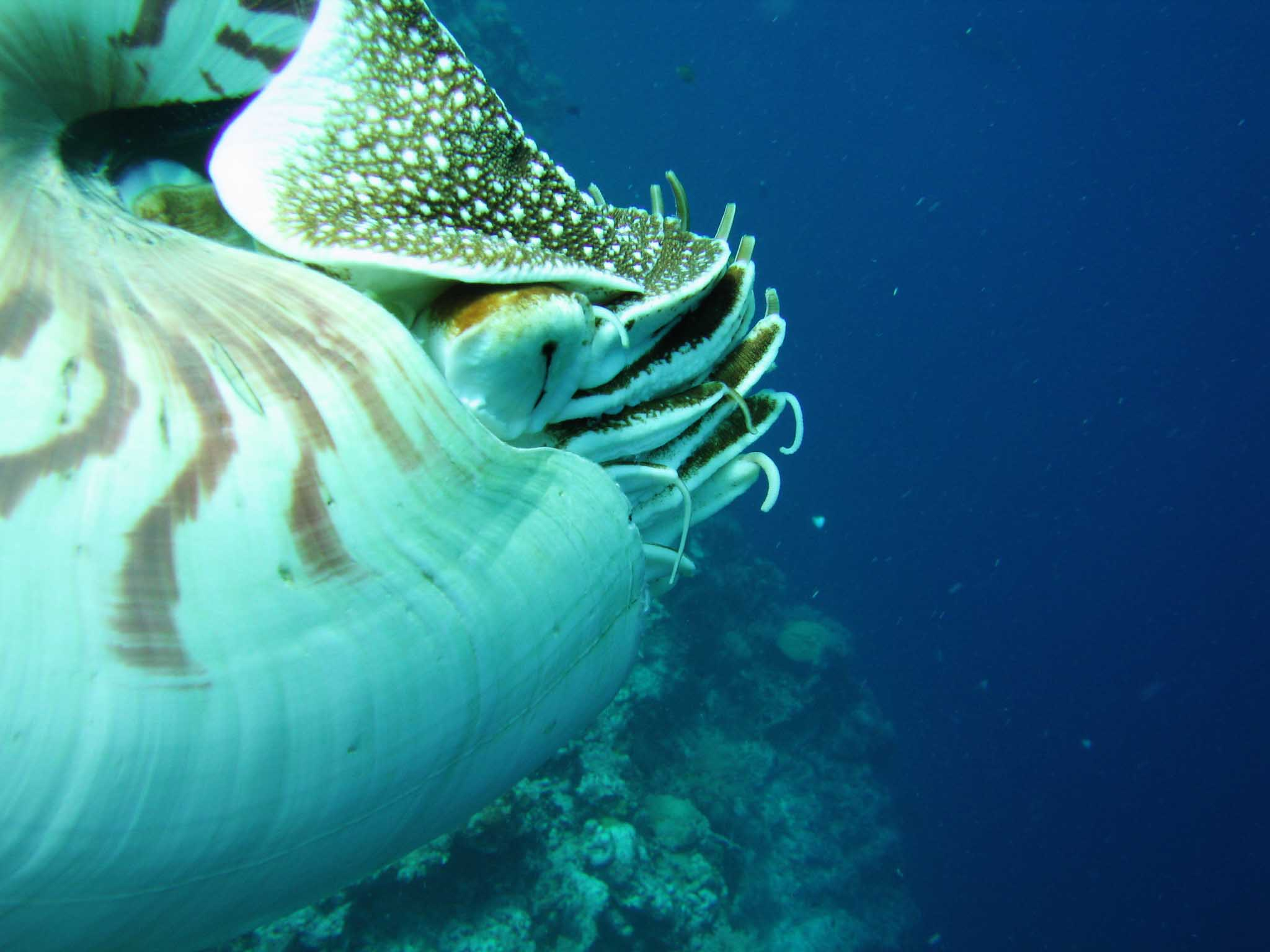
Close-up view of the eye of the Palau nautilus

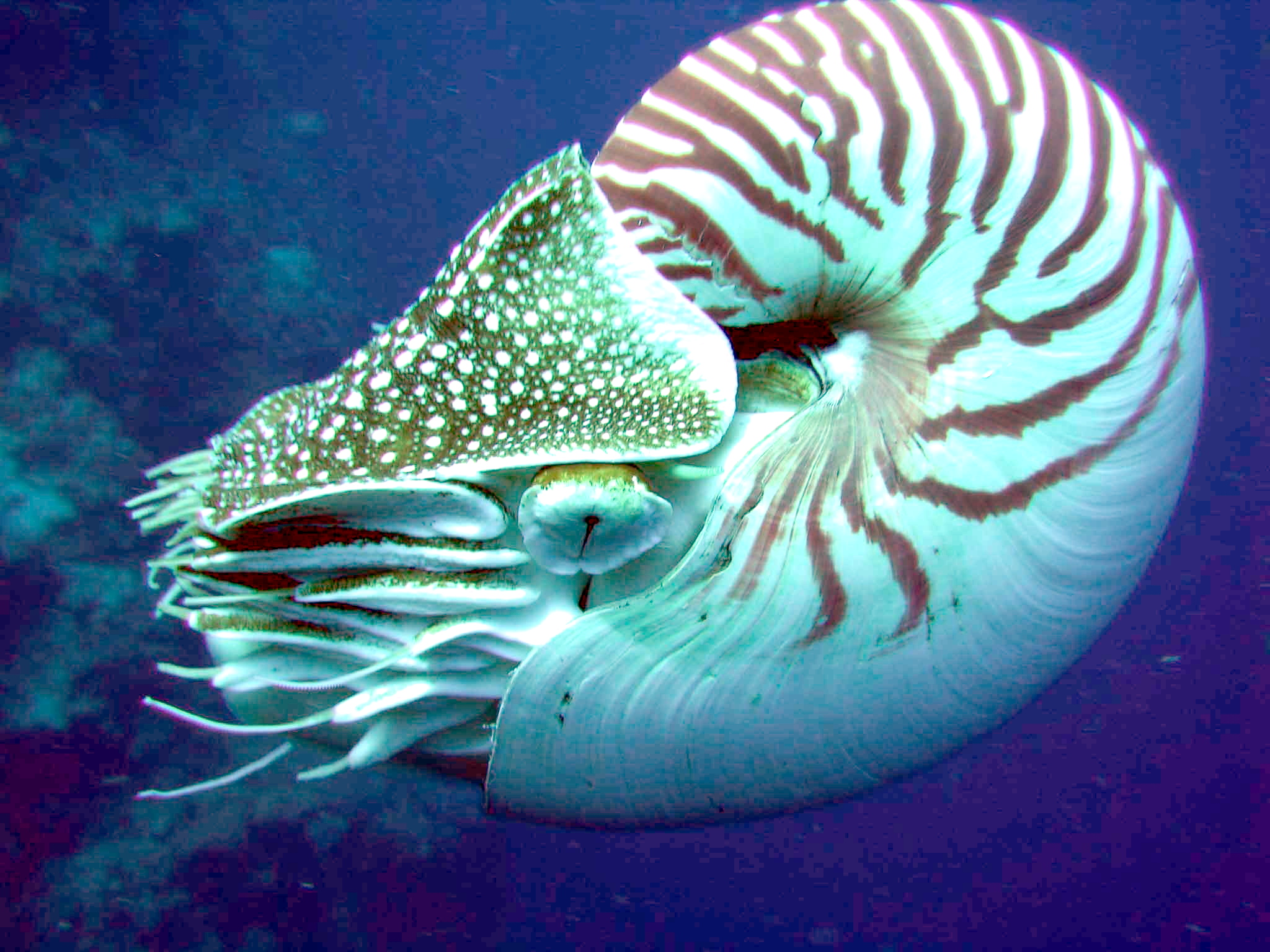
View of a Palau nautilus from the side

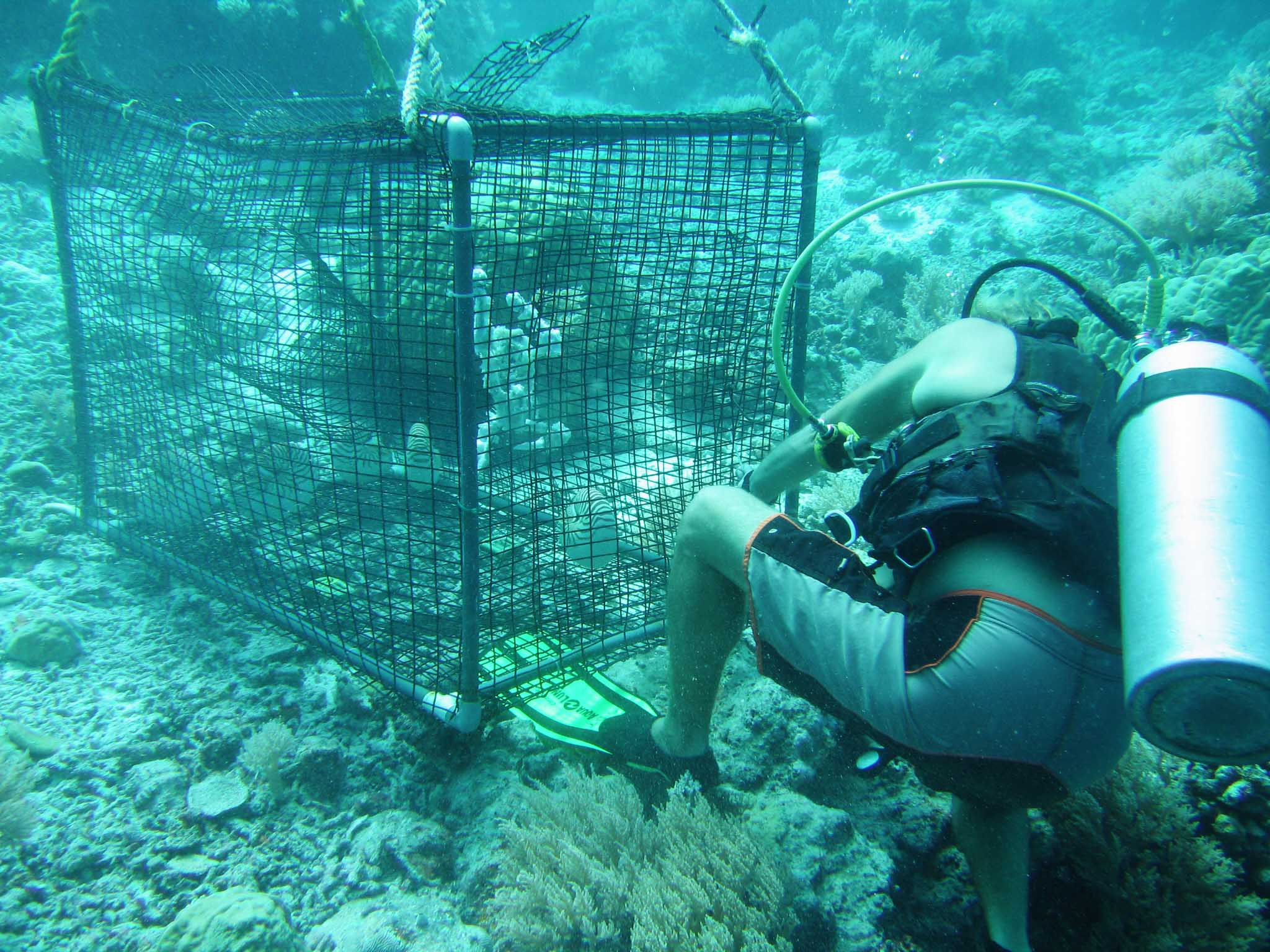
A cage used to capture Palau nautiluses from a depth of approximately 30 m: note the five nautiluses and the mostly eaten chicken. The animals are released unharmed.
