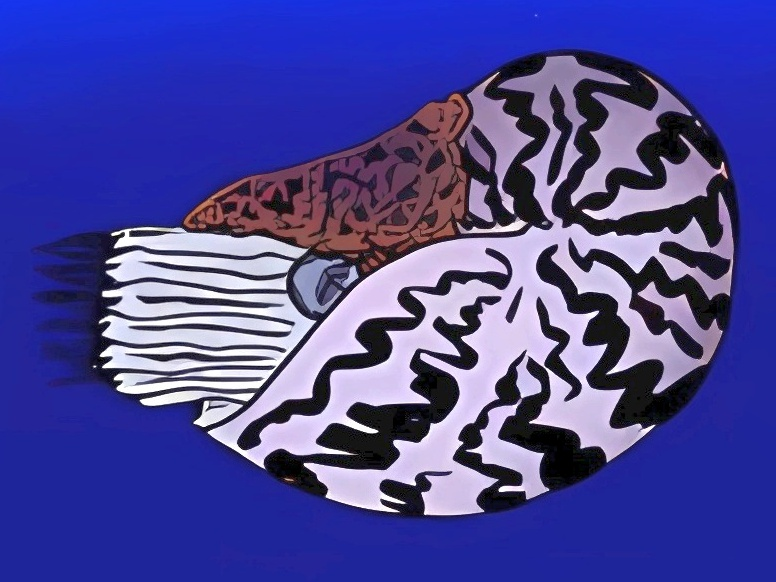
- artist's reconstruction

Scientific classification
- Domain: Eukaryota
- Kingdom: Animalia
- Phylum: Mollusca
- Class: Cephalopoda
- Subclass: Nautiloidea
- Order: Nautilida
- Family: Nautilidae
- Genus: Nautilus
- Species: N. cookanus

Binomial name
- Nautilus cookanus Whitfield, 1892

Synonyms
- Nautilus cookanum Whitfield, 1892 (Missp.); Eutrephoceras cookanum (Whitfield, 1892)

= Nautilus cookanus =

Nautilus cookanus Temporal range: Late Eocene

Extinct species of mollusc

Nautilus cookanus is an extinct species of nautilus. It lived during the Eocene epoch. N. cookanus placed within the genus Nautilus, together with extant species based on their shared shell characters. Fossils of the species from the Late Eocene Hoko River Formation are noted as one of the two oldest occurrences for the genus (with the other, older occurrence being N. praepompilius of the Paleogene). Its name has frequently been misspelled as "cookanum".
