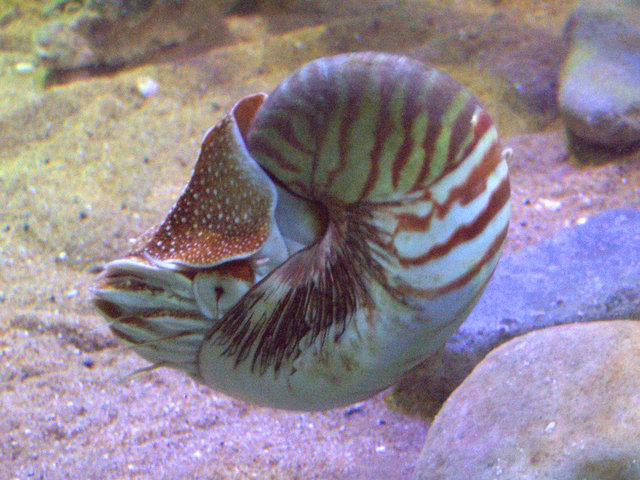
- A live Nautilus pompilius in an aquarium

Scientific classification
- Kingdom: Animalia
- Phylum: Mollusca
- Class: Cephalopoda
- Subclass: Nautiloidea
- Order: Nautilida
- Family: Nautilidae
- Genus: Nautilus; Linnaeus, 1758

Type species
- N. pompilius Linnaeus, 1758

Living species
- Nautilus belauensis; Nautilus macromphalus; Nautilus pompilius; Nautilus samoaensis; Nautilus stenomphalus; Nautilus vanuatuensis; Nautilus vitiensis

= Nautilus (genus) =

Nautilus Temporal range: late Eocene–Recent

Genus of molluscs

Nautilus is a marine cephalopod genus in the mollusk family Nautilidae. Species in this genus differ significantly, morphologically, from the two nautilus species in the adjacent sister-taxon Allonautilus. The oldest fossils of the genus are known from the Late Eocene Hoko River Formation, in Washington State and from Late-Eocene to Early Oligocene sediments in Kazakhstan. The oldest fossils of the modern species Nautilus pompilius are from Early Pleistocene sediments off the coast of Luzon in the Philippines.

The commonly used term 'nautilus' usually refers to any of the surviving members of Nautilidae, and more specifically to the Nautilus pompilius species. The entire family of Nautilidae, including all species in the genera Nautilus and Allonautilus, is listed on Appendix II of the Convention on International Trade in Endangered Species of Wild Fauna and Flora (CITES).

Various authors claim that the genus consists of between four and seven extant species; this remains the subject of debate. Nautiloids are typically found in shallow ocean waters in tropical seas, mainly within the Indo-Pacific, from the Coral Triangle and Strait of Malacca to the open water South Pacific islands. The genus Nautilus includes several species represented in the fossil record; however, these have also been contentious in their placement, and some are only provisionally accepted.

== Classification ==
The classification of species within Nautilus has been contentious for decades, and the genus has been reconfigured and redefined several times throughout its history. Nautilus is the type genus of the family Nautilidae, originally defined as any coiled-shell species with simple sutures, or walls, between shell compartments. Any shells with complex sutures were assigned to the genus Ammonites. This definition persisted for nearly 200 years, from the time of the genera's 1758 inception by Carl Linnaeus to 1949, when paleobiologist Arthur K. Miller provided a detailed description of the shell of N. pompilius, becoming the type species of the genus. In 1951, he determined that only extant species of Nautilus should be placed in the genus, despite many fossil species having already been assigned to it.

In the years following this conclusion, fossil species were still sometimes assigned to the genus; however, many other authors insisted that these be excluded. In 2021, a review of the evidence concluded that the recognition of exclusively-fossil genera was largely arbitrary, instead recognising numerous extinct species within the genus Nautilus.

== Species ==
Species	Authority	Range	Image
†Nautilus altifrons	(Chapman, 1915)	Australia	
†Nautilus balcombensis	(Chapman, 1915)	Australia	
Nautilus belauensis	Saunders, 1981	Palau	
†Nautilus butonensis	Martin, 1933	Indonesia	
†Nautilus campbelli (Note: Provisional placement)	Meek, 1862	Western North America	
†Nautilus cookanus	Whitfield, 1892	North America	
†Nautilus geelongensis	(Foord, 1891)	Australia	
†Nautilus javanus	Martin, 1879	Indonesia	
Nautilus macromphalus	G.B. Sowerby II, 1849	New Caledonia	
Nautilus pompilius (Note: Type; also biggest and most widespread species)	Linnaeus, 1758	Indonesia	
†Nautilus praepompilius	Shimansky, 1957		
Nautilus samoaensis	Barord et al., 2023	Samoa	
Nautilus stenomphalus	G.B. Sowerby II, 1849	Great Barrier Reef	
†Nautilus taiwanus	Huang, 2002	Taiwan	
Nautilus vanuatuensis	Barord et al., 2023	Vanuatu	
Nautilus vitiensis	Barord et al., 2023	Fiji	

Other described species:

Species	Status
Nautilus ambiguus	Nomen dubium
Nautilus alumnus	Nomen dubium
Nautilus scrobiculatus	Reclassified as Allonautilus scrobiculatus
Nautilus umbiliculatus	Nomen dubium, synonym of A. scrobiculatus
Nautilus perforatus	Reclassified as Allonautilus perforatus
Nautilus texturatus	Nomen dubium, synonym of A. scrobiculatus
Nautilus repertus	Nomen dubium, likely a giant form of N. pompilius

=== Controversy over species ===
There has been much debate over the validity of species within the genus, and several identified species have since been reclassified or determined as taxonomic synonyms or nomen dubium (a doubtful classification). As of 2015, only four Nautilus species have been recognised, specifically N. pompilius, N. macromphalus, N. stenomphalus, and N. belauensis, and three more were described in 2023. Nautilus scrobiculatus, now Allonautilus scrobiculatus, has been assigned to a new genus, and several species listed above have been identified as synonyms of this species, namely N. umbiculatus, N. perforatus, and N. texturatus. Much of the confusion regarding the classification of species is due to the rarity of live specimens. The majority of described species have been determined on the drift shells of individuals alone, leading to inaccuracies when defining species divisions. For example, although N. pompilius was well studied in the 19th century, it was not until 1996 that soft tissues of Allonautilus scrobiculatus had been dissected.

== Genetic studies ==
Several genetic studies have also been conducted on select species of Nautilus, from 1995 onwards, most of which focus on a single gene, called COI. These studies ultimately lead to the decision to remove N. scrobiculatus from the genus. Furthermore, some biologists claim that N. stenomphalus and N. belauensis are members of N. pompilius based on both genetic and morphological data. One study, sampling Nautiluses in 2012, demonstrated that the features of Nautilus pompilius and Nautilus stenomphalus exist along a spectrum, with a range of individuals displaying a combination of characteristics, further invalidating them as separate species.

Nautilus attracted to bait, American Samoa. Captured with Baited Remote Underwater Video Station (BRUVS).

Additionally, mitochondrial DNA studies, using two gene regions, also have led to the notion that many of the morphological differences between different Nautilus populations are simply localised variations within the single Nautilus species. This same 2011 study, however, suggested that N. macromphalus was a species synonymous with A. scrobiculatus, leading to further debate over classification. These findings were also reinforced by the initial DNA studies conducted on the genus, which only revealed two phylogenetic species.

A 2017 study determined that there were likely five Nautilus species, however these did not exactly correlate to the described species of the genus. While the status of N. macromphalus, N. stenomphalus, and N. pompilius were validated by the genetic study, two undescribed, but genetically distinct, species were discovered in the South Pacific. One of these cryptic species was recorded from Vanuatu, while the other from Fiji and American Samoa. While this study recorded five species, its results suggested that N. belauensis and N. repertus were synonyms with N. pompilius. This study resulted in the description of three new species in 2023, recognizing the species from Fiji and American Samoa as two taxa rather than one.

== Evolution ==
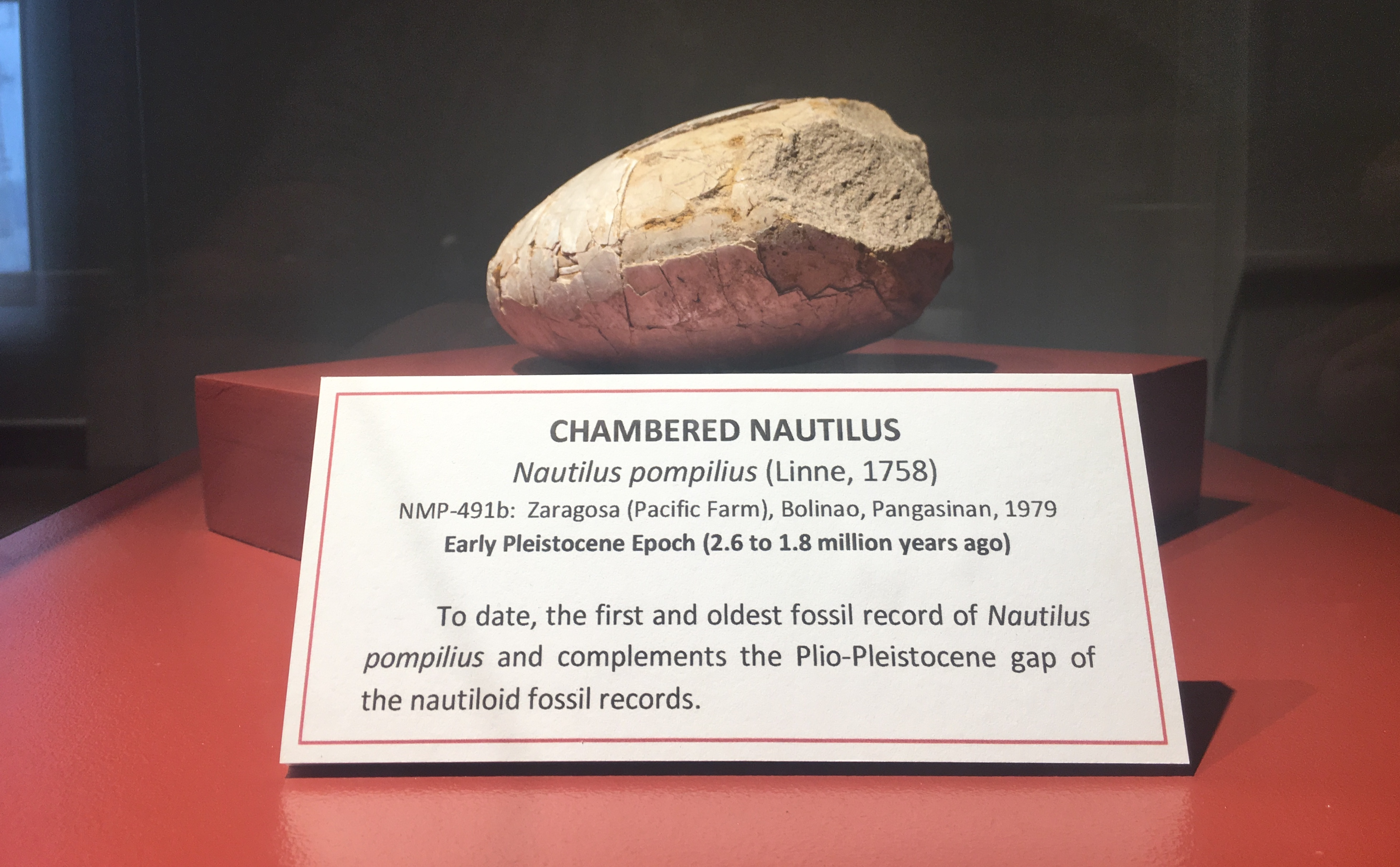
The first and oldest fossil of chambered nautilus displayed at Philippine National Museum.

In addition to defining species, genetic studies have also provided evidence for the evolution of the genus over time. Mitochondrial DNA studies have indicated that the genus is currently undergoing evolutionary radiation in the Indo-Pacific. The divergence between the genus Nautilus, and its sister taxon Allonautilus likely occurred around New Guinea, and the Great Barrier Reef, during the Mesozoic. From there, populations of Nautilus split diverged further, involving migrations east to Vanuatu, Fiji, and American Samoa, as well as west, to the Philippines, Palau, Indonesia, and western Australia.

== Sensory organs ==
Nautilus have unique sensory organs, which differ from related genera in several ways. Unlike other cephalopods, the eyes of Nautilus species lack ocular muscles and instead move via a stalk, which contains both muscle and connective tissue. Additionally, Nautilus eyes lack any lens or cornea and only have an aperture to allow for light.

Below their eyes, Nautilus also feature rhinophores, which are small sacs with cilia. It has been suggested that this organ contains chemoreceptors, to detect food or sample the surrounding water. Additionally, the tentacles of the Nautilus also perform several sensory functions. Their ocular and preocular tentacles feature cilia, and operate as mechanoreceptors, while their digital tentacles have been hypothesised to feature a range of receptor cells.

== Habitat and distribution ==
Species within the genus Nautilus are localised to the Indo-Pacific, specifically the tropical seas within this area, however the full extent of their geographic distribution has yet to be recorded. The movements of Nautilus species are greatly restricted by water depth. Nautilus are unable to easily move across areas deeper than 800 metres, and most of their activity occurs at a depth of 100–300 metres deep. Nautilus can occasionally be found closer to the surface than 100 metres, however, the minimum depth they can reach is determined by factors such as water temperature and season. All Nautilus species are likely endangered, based on information from Nautilus Pompilius overfishing in the Philippines, which resulted in an 80% decline in the population from 1980 to 2010.

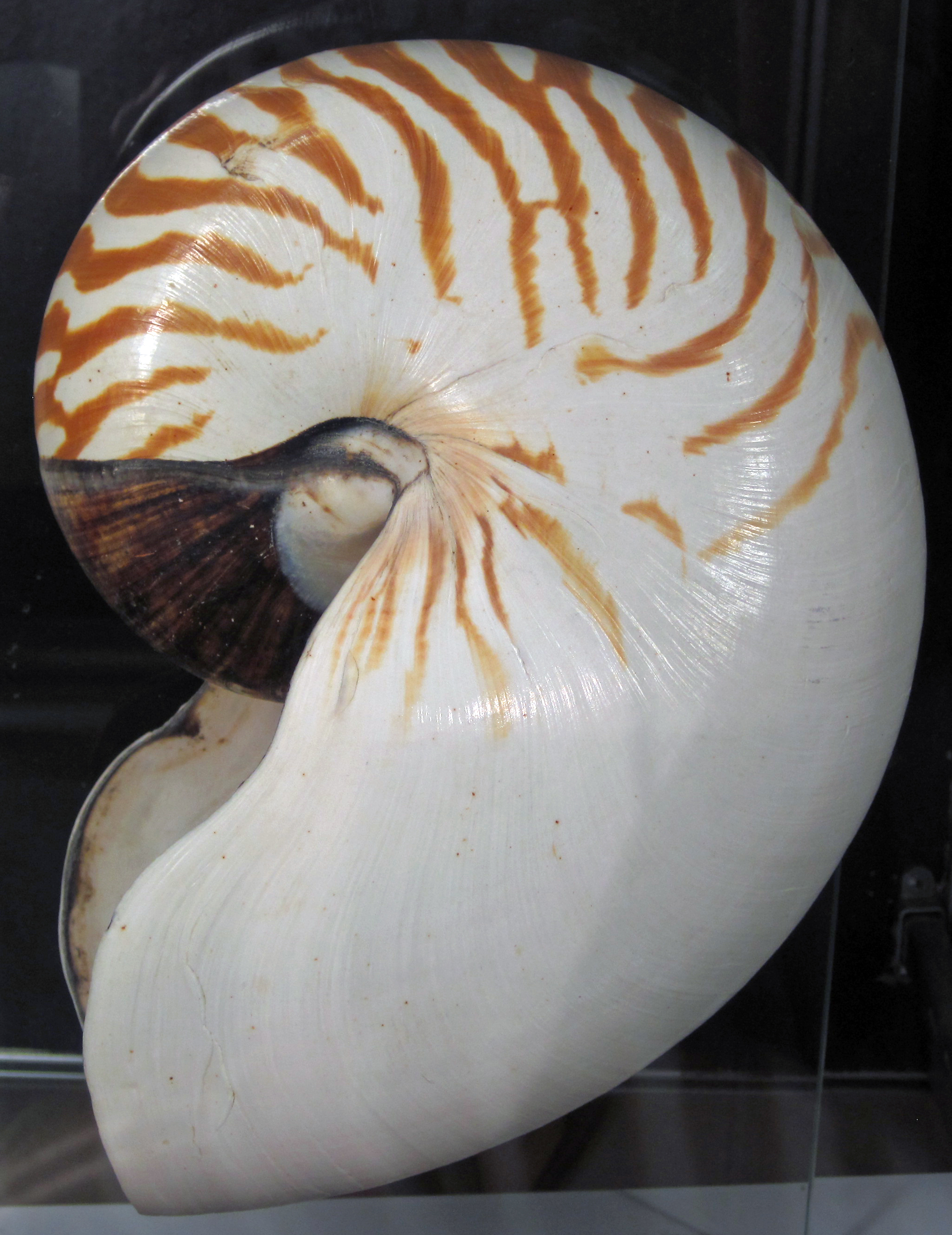
A Nautilus shell from Broome, Australia. The majority of recovered shells, like this example, are found as drift shells.

Many shells recovered from areas of the world have not yet been identified down to the level of species, however, are still identifiable as members of the genus Nautilus. Shells have been found across a wide range of coastal areas, including Korea, Australia, Seychelles, Mauritius, the Philippines, Taiwan, Japan, Thailand, India, Sri Lanka, Kenya, and South Africa. This does not necessarily imply live populations of Nautilus at these sites, however, as Nautilus drift shells are able to make their way across oceans via currents. Following the death of an individual, Nautilus shells can float to the surface, where they can remain for a considerable time period, however the buoyancy of shells after death was found to be dependent on several factors, such as the rate of decay. An experiment with a Nautilus shell in an aquarium resulted in the shell floating for over two years, and one recovered shell was revealed to have been afloat for a period of 11 years. Furthermore, shells have been demonstrated to drift considerable distances in this time, contributing to their extensive distribution across coastal areas. Several ocean currents have been identified to contribute to this process. The Kuroshio Current carries shells from the Philippines to areas such as Japan, and the Equatorial current is responsible for many of the shells recovered from the Marshall Islands.

== Behaviour ==
Nautilus have been observed to spend days in deeper areas around coral reefs, to avoid predation from turtles and carnivorous fish, and ascend to shallow areas of the reef during nights. Here, they engage in scavenging activity, seeking out animal remains, and the moults of crustaceans. Nautilus species usually travel and feed alone. Nautilus return to deeper areas following daybreak and also lay eggs in these locations, which take approximately one year to hatch. This behaviour may have ensured their survival during the Cretaceous-Paleogene extinction, when shallow areas of ocean became inhospitable. Nautilus have been noted to exhibit an extensive range of depth, close to 500 metres, however, they were demonstrated to be at risk of implosion when exceeding their depth and pressure limits. Depending on the species, the shells of live Nautilus will collapse at depths of 750 metres or deeper.

The feeding behaviour of the genus has been identified from observation of captive individuals, as well as the stomach contents of wild specimens. Nautilus are opportunistic scavengers and feed on a variety of crustaceans, including their moults, and fish, however, they have been observed to feed on chicken and bat bait. Initially, Nautilus were thought to actively hunt certain prey, however, this activity has only been recorded in traps, where prey species are confined in close proximity to Nautilus. Nautilus locate these food sources by using their tentacles, which have chemosensory functions, as well as by sight. Nautilus participate in routine vertical migration, in which they ascend to shallow areas of reefs, between 100 and 150 metres deep, during the night to feed, and later descend to depths of 250–350 metres during the day, however, these depths may vary depending on local geographic characteristics. Nautilus are able to ascend at speeds of approximately 2 metres per minute and descend at speeds of 3 metres per minute.

=== Predation ===
Several species have been observed to prey on Nautilus. Octopuses were listed as predators of the genus, following an incident where an octopus was shown to have partially consumed a Nautilus in a trap. Additionally, many drift shells exhibit small holes which match the patterns produced by octopus boring into shell to feed. Teleosts, such as triggerfish, have also been observed to feed on Nautilus, by violently charging at individuals to break their shells. In response to attacks from predators, Nautilus withdraw into their shells.

== Nautilus in aquaria ==
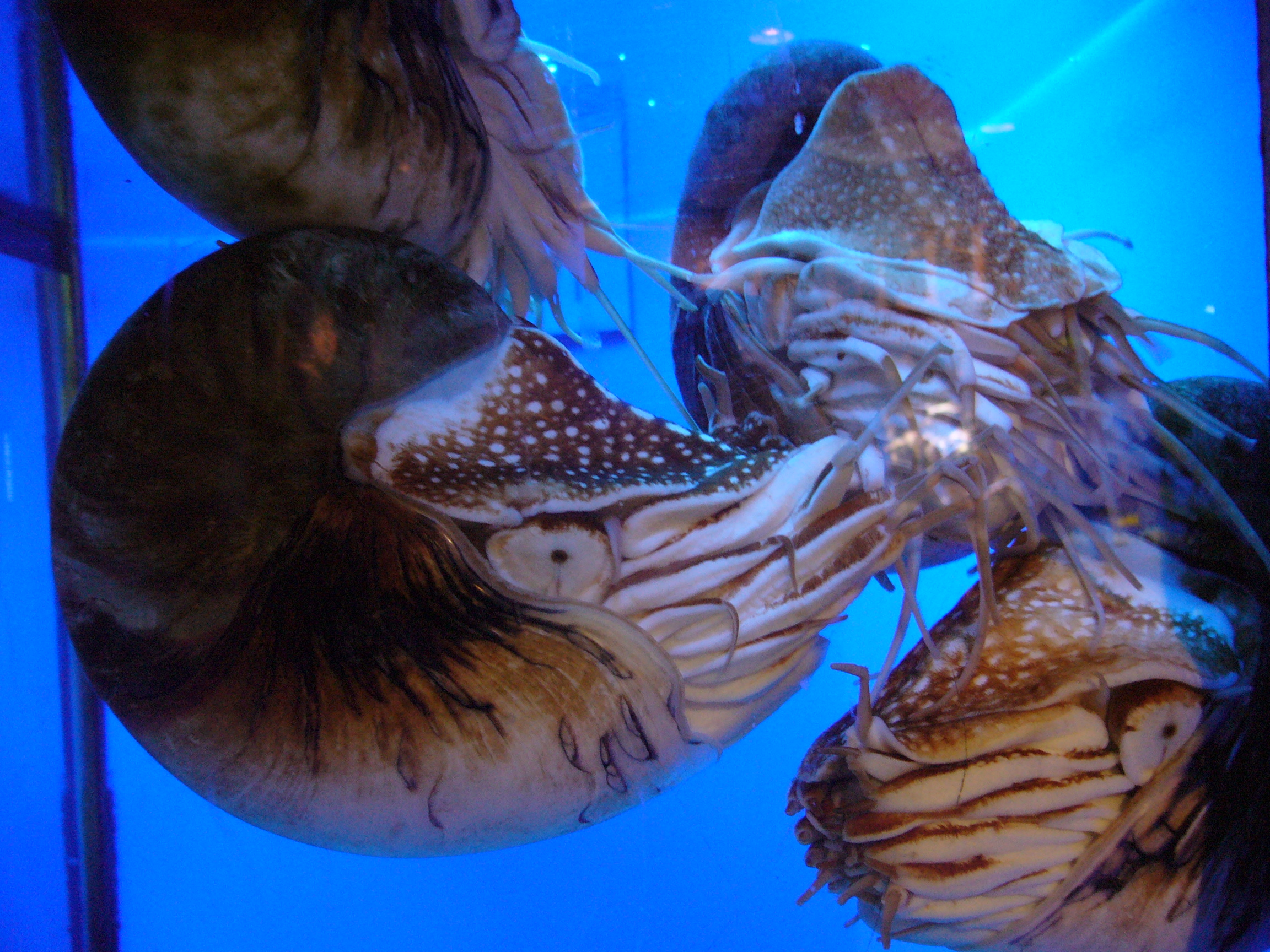
Live Nautilus pompilius at the Aquarium Finisterrae, Spain.

It is possible to keep Nautilus in aquaria, however, specific care is necessary to ensure their survival in captivity. The survival rate of Nautilus in captivity is relatively poor, primarily due to the stress that individuals are subjected to during transportation. As many as 50–80% of Nautilus die during transportation, and this percentage can be higher if individuals are exposed to high temperatures. In captivity, Nautilus are generally fed a diet of whole shrimp, fish, crab, and lobster moults. Several aquaria around the world host specimens of the genus, however, there have not yet been any successful attempts of breeding in captivity, despite viable eggs being produced at several locations. Two Nautilus eggs were hatched at Waikiki Aquarium, however, these individuals both died months later.

In addition to observing wild specimens, our knowledge of Nautilus temperature thresholds is also supplemented by the study of captive individuals in aquaria. Captive Nautilus specimens have demonstrated that prolonged exposure to temperatures over 25 degrees Celsius will eventually result in death after several days. However, individuals have been documented to experience temperatures higher than this, and survive, as long as they are not exposed to these temperatures for longer than 10 hours. Optimal temperatures for the genus tend to range from 9–21 degrees Celsius.

=== Reproduction ===
The majority of our knowledge regarding Nautilus reproduction comes from captive species in aquaria. From these specimens, it appears that Nautilus do not have an elaborate courtship process. Males have been observed to attempt to mate with any object the same size and shape as another Nautilus. If a male is successful in finding a female, however, the mating process follows, and afterwards, the male may continue to hold onto the female for a period ranging from minutes to hours.

Nautilus eggs are laid in capsules, usually 3–4 cm long, which gradually harden when exposed to seawater. It is not yet known how exactly the juveniles break out of these capsules, yet it has been hypothesized that they are able to chew their way out, using their beak. The genus exhibits a skewed sex ratio, biased towards male individuals. This phenomenon has been observed at several locations around the globe, with population samples consisting of up to 95% males. The reason for this is currently unknown.

Nautilus male has a reproductive organ named Van der Hoeven's organ. Nautilus female has two reproductive organs whose functions are unknown, the Organ of Valenciennes and Owen's laminated organ.
