= Hoko River Formation =

Late Eocene marine sedimentary geologic formation

Coordinates: 48.1186°N 123.7988°W

- Stratigraphic range: Late Eocene
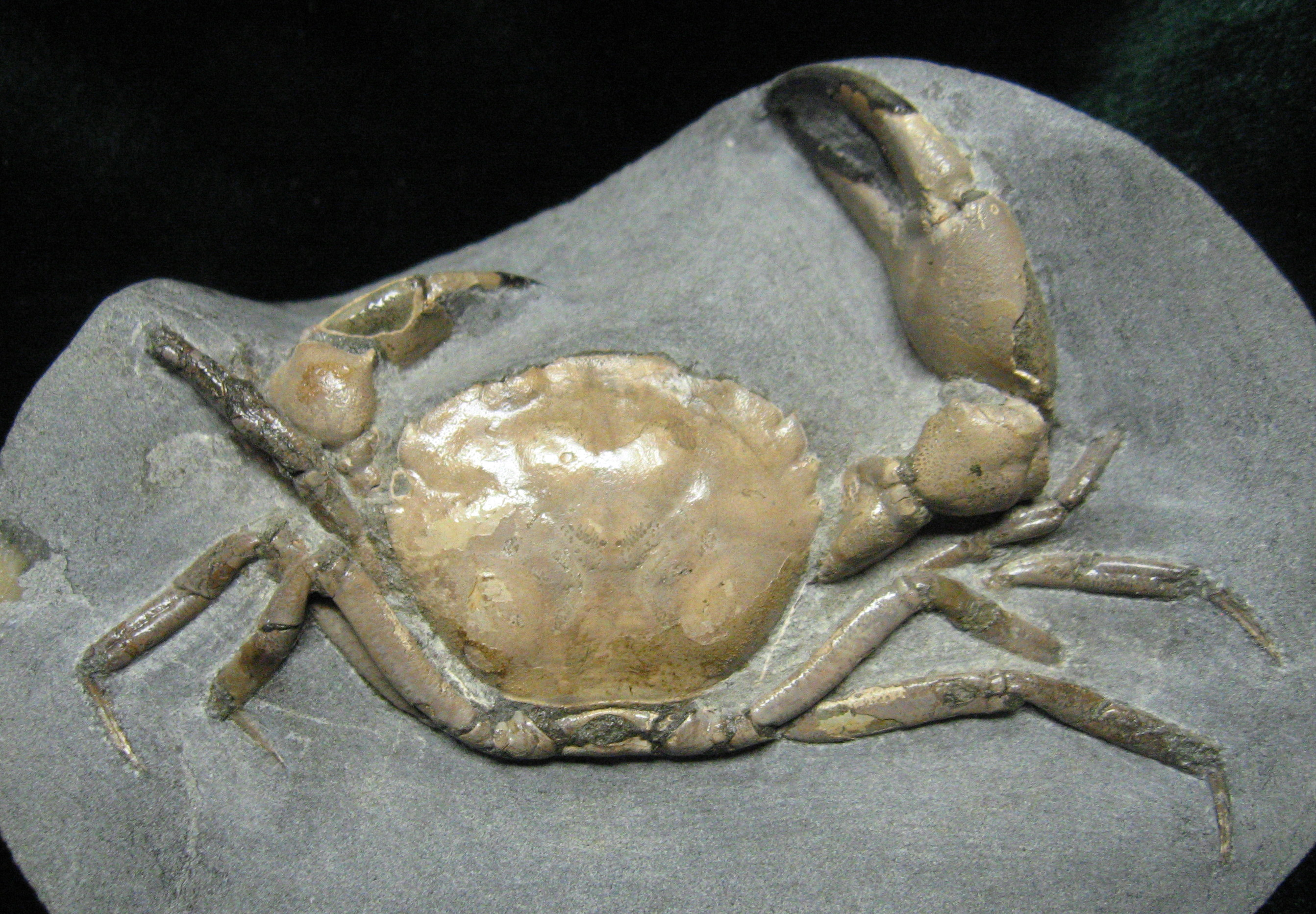
- Branchioplax washingtoniana, Hoko River Formation
- Type: Geological formation
- Unit of: Twin River Group
- Underlies: Makah Formation sediments
- Overlies: Lyre Formation sediments
- Thickness: approximately 2,300 metres (7,550 ft)

Lithology
- Primary: submarine fan system

Location
- Region: Clallam County, Olympic Peninsula Washington
- Country: United States
- Extent: over 100 kilometres (62 mi)

Type section
- Named by: Snavely et al, 1978

The Hoko River Formation is a Late Eocene marine sedimentary geologic formation. The formation is exposed in outcrops along the Strait of Juan de Fuca on the Olympic Peninsula in Washington state, USA. It is known for containing numerous fossils of crabs. It overlies the older Lyre Formation and underlies the younger Makah Formation.

== Geology and stratigraphy ==
The Hoko River Formation consists of sediments deposited on the inner and middle slopes of a deep marine fan system. It is composed primarily of siltstones and some sandstones exposed under and to the south of the main Makah Formation outcrops along the Strait of Juan De Fuca. The type section, as designated by Parke Snavely et al., is a 1,600 metres (5,200 ft) section which outcrops along the Hoko River, for which the formation is named, and a 2,300 metres (7,500 ft) section which outcrops along Deep Creek. While the Hoko River formation overlies the Lyre Formation in many places, the two formations intertongue in others. The Makah and Hoko River formations are separated by a major unconformity. Calcareous clasts in the formation contain crab, gastropod, cephalopod, and wood fossils. Magnetostratigraphy performed in 2008 on samples taken from the type section of the Hoko River formation showed a correlation of age with either Chron C18r (40.0–41.2 Ma) or Chron C17r (38.0–38.2Ma). A closer correlation was not possible due to the limited sample size obtained for the testing. Of note is that the samples tested for both the Makah and Hoko River Formations showed a slight counterclockwise tectonic rotation. This is in contrast to many other formations of similar ages on the Olympic Peninsula with clockwise rotations. Similar results, however, from some formations on Vancouver Island and the northern Olympic Peninsula have been reported.

== Paleontology ==
Macrofossils are uncommon and occur approximately 300 m above the formation base. Crab fossils are common in the formation, while rare Nautilus aff. N. cookanum, Aturia cf. A. alabamensis and an indeterminate Belosaepiidae shell have been found. The fossil of Nautilus aff. N. cookanum is one of the two oldest occurrences for the genus Nautilus in the fossil record, the other occurrence being fossils of Nautilus praepompilius from the Republic of Kazakhstan.

Fossils of the extinct species Megokkos (ex Euphylax) feldmanni, a small crab, were found on this site. M. feldmanni was first described from the formation by Torrey Nyborg, Ross Berglund, and James Goedert in 2003 as the oldest member of the genus Euphylax. These remains were considered the earliest fossil record of the Portunidae subfamily Podophthalminae, as well as the earliest fossil record of this genus in the eastern North Pacific. In their 2006 paper on fossil decopods of the Caribbean, Carrie Schweitzer and her coauthors moved the species from Euphylax to the extinct genus Megokkos making it one of three species of Megokkos crabs found in the Washington state fossil record. Fossils of the genus Montezumella from the Hoko River Formation represent the oldest occurrence of the crab family Cheiragonidae.
