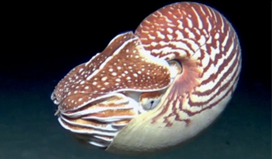

Conservation status
- Vulnerable (IUCN 3.1)

Scientific classification
- Kingdom: Animalia
- Phylum: Mollusca
- Class: Cephalopoda
- Subclass: Nautiloidea
- Order: Nautilida
- Family: Nautilidae
- Genus: Nautilus
- Species: N. samoaensis

Binomial name
- Nautilus samoaensis Barord et al., 2023

= Nautilus samoaensis =

Species of cephalopod

Nautilus samoaensis is a species of nautilus native to the waters of American Samoa. It was described as a separate species in 2023.

The Nautilus samoaensis was named based on observations of shell and genetic structure.
