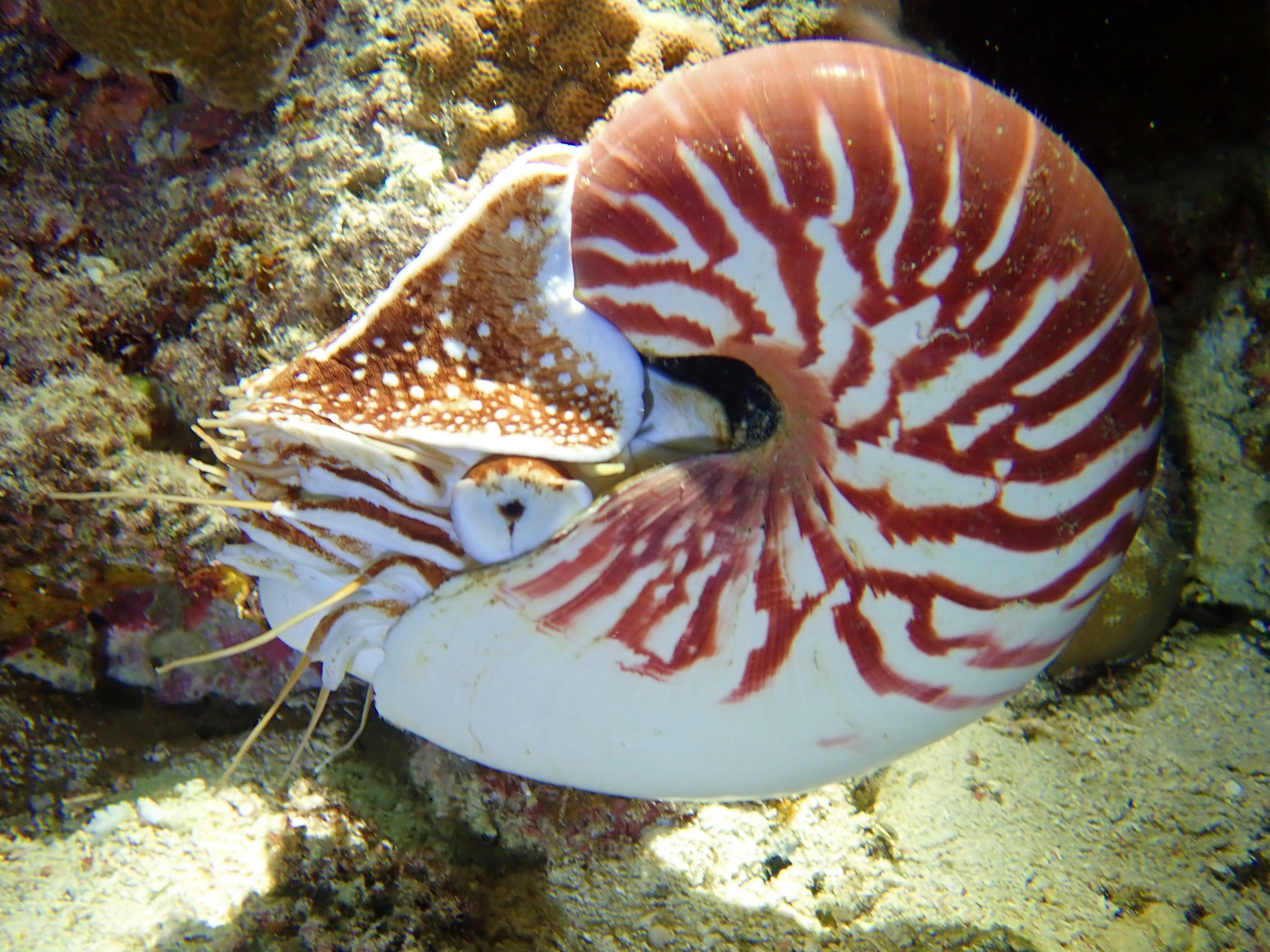
- Nautilus vanuatensis in the wild

Conservation status
- Vulnerable (IUCN 3.1)

Scientific classification
- Kingdom: Animalia
- Phylum: Mollusca
- Class: Cephalopoda
- Subclass: Nautiloidea
- Order: Nautilida
- Family: Nautilidae
- Genus: Nautilus
- Species: N. vanuatuensis

Binomial name
- Nautilus vanuatuensis Barord et al., 2023

= Nautilus vanuatuensis =

Species of nautilus

Nautilus vanuatuensis is a species of nautilus native to the waters of Vanuatu. It was described as a separate species in 2023.

== Description ==
It is distinguished from other nautilus species by its abundantly colored red shell. It has 40–50% shell coloration (more than any other Nautilus species with a plugged umbilicus) and its pigmentation occurs in stripes extending from venter to umbilicus.

== Habitat ==
Nautilus vanuatuensis primarily lives in deep waters (200–400 m) although it is commonly observed in shallow waters (5 m). It seems endemic to Vanuatu, where it is apparently the only species.

== Etymology ==
The specific epithet, vanuatuensis, refers to Vanuatu, the type locality.
