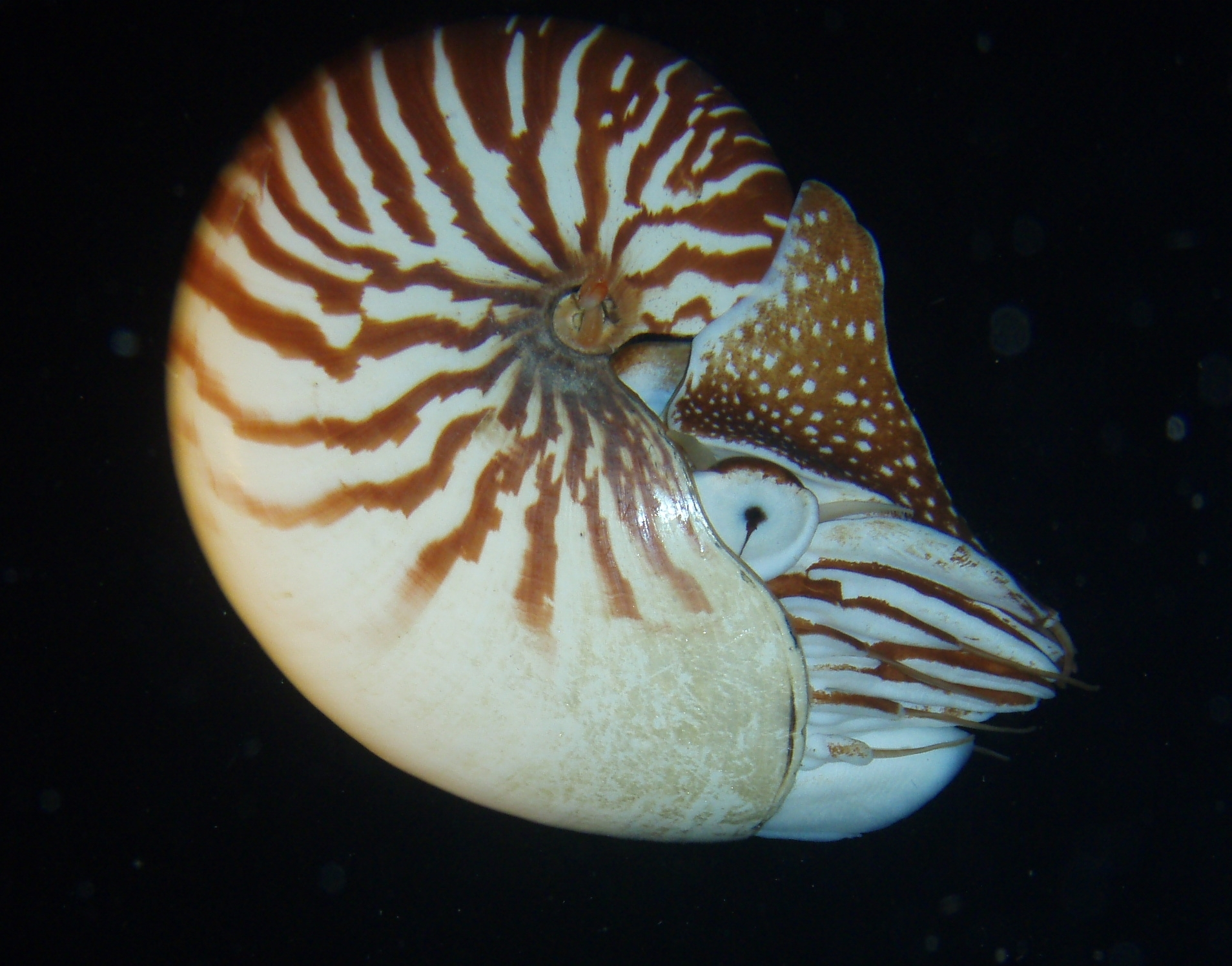

Conservation status
- Data Deficient (IUCN 3.1)
- CITES Appendix II

Scientific classification
- Kingdom: Animalia
- Phylum: Mollusca
- Class: Cephalopoda
- Subclass: Nautiloidea
- Order: Nautilida
- Family: Nautilidae
- Genus: Nautilus
- Species: N. macromphalus

Binomial name
- Nautilus macromphalus Sowerby II, 1848

= Nautilus macromphalus =

Bellybutton nautilus

Species of cephalopod known as the bellybutton nautilus

Nautilus macromphalus, the bellybutton nautilus, is a species of nautilus native to the waters off New Caledonia and northeastern Australia. The shell of this species lacks a callus, leaving the umbilicus exposed, in which the inner coils of the shell are visible. This opening constitutes about 15% of the shell diameter at its widest point.

Like all Nautilus species, N. macromphalus usually lives at depths of several hundred metres. During the night, however, they rise to much shallower waters (2 to 20 m depth) to feed.

The tentacles of this species are long and thin, having raised ridges which help provide grip when catching prey. N. macromphalus is the smallest species of nautilus. The shell is usually up to around 16 cm in diameter, although the largest specimen ever recorded measured 180 mm.

More than 35 shells of N. macromphalus dating to around 6400–7100 years BP were found in a cenote on Lifou, the Loyalty Islands. Based on these radiocarbon dates it is thought the cenote was connected to marine waters for some 700 years before becoming cut off completely. During this time nautiluses were able to enter it through a flooded karst system. Many of these animals apparently became trapped and died there.

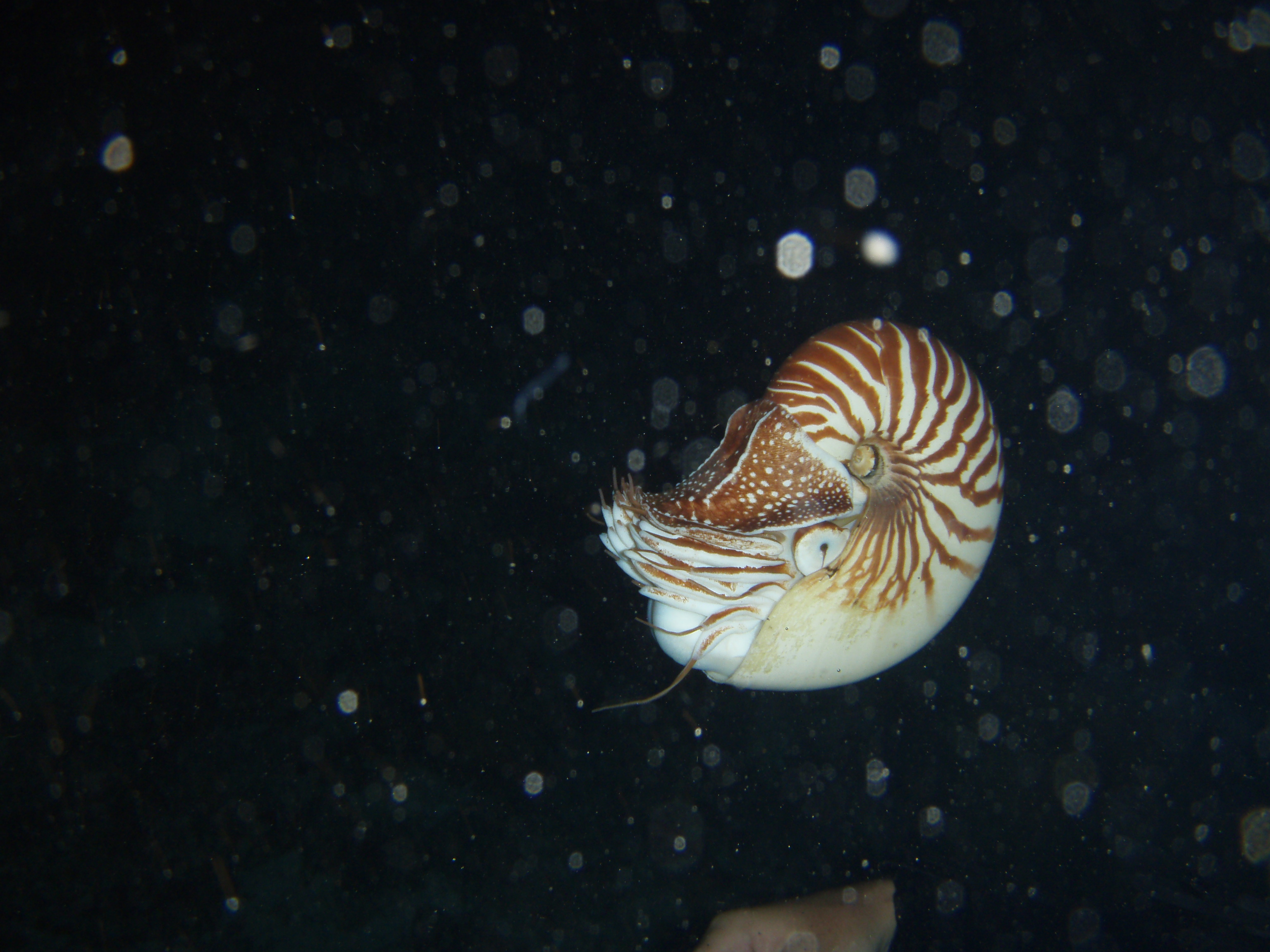
N. macromphalus seen during a night dive in Sandal Wood Bay, Lifou, New Caledonia at a depth of 15 m

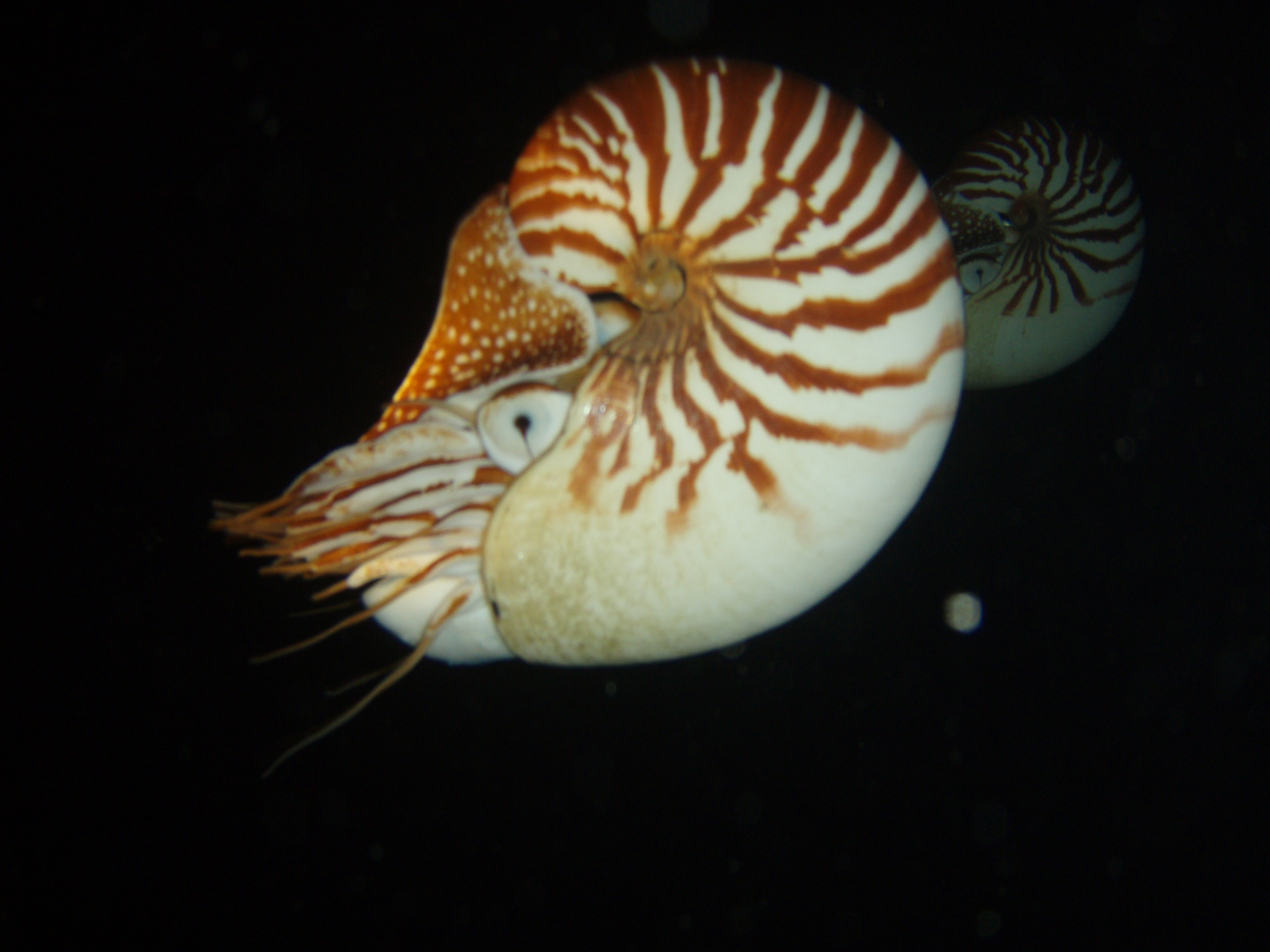
Pair of N. macromphalus in Sandal Wood Bay

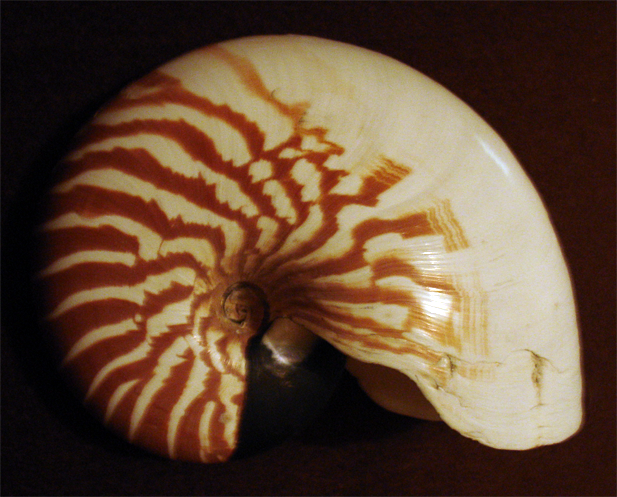
Nautilus macromphalus shell

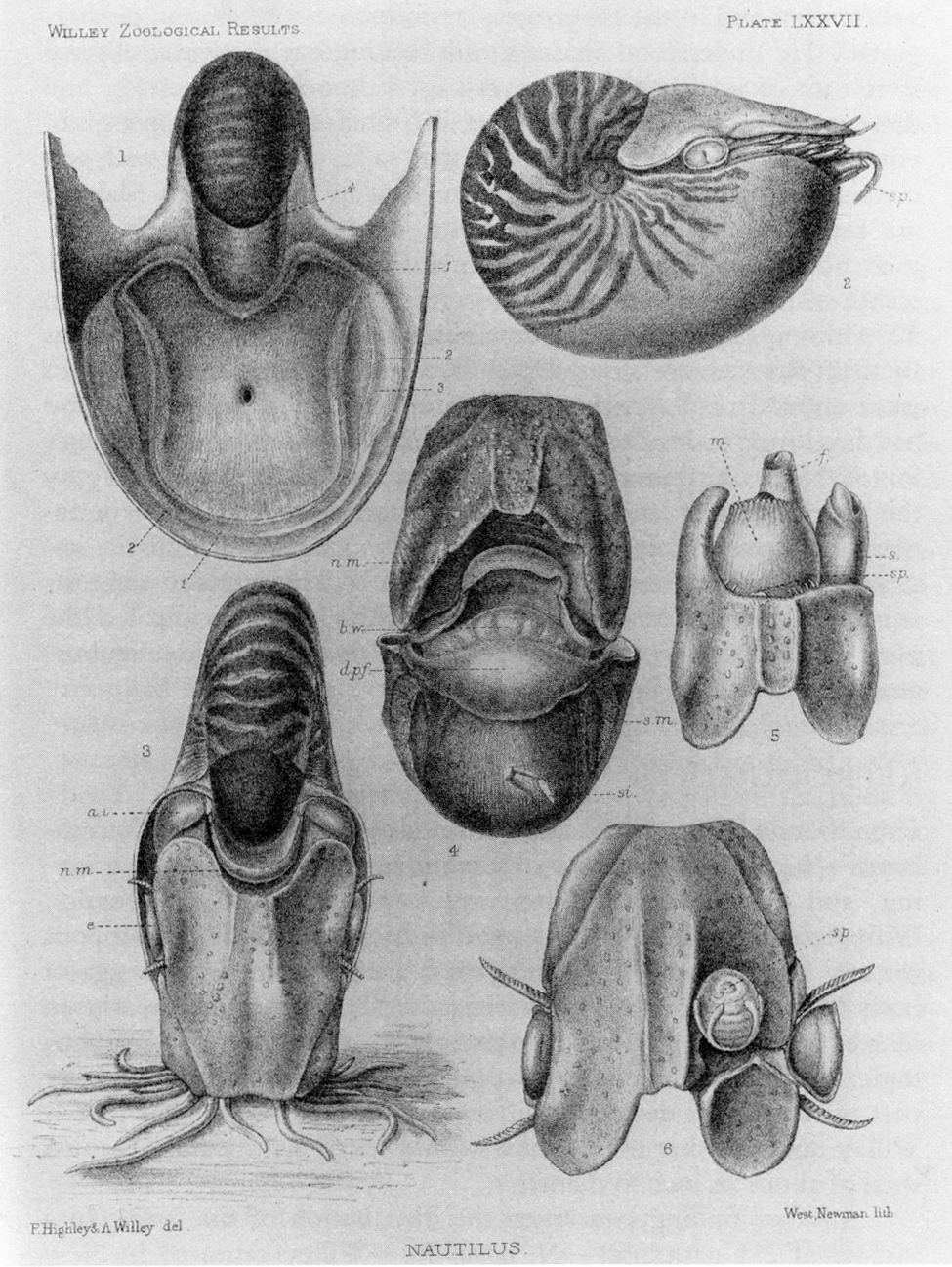
Anatomy of N. macromphalus from Arthur Willey's monograph, 1912

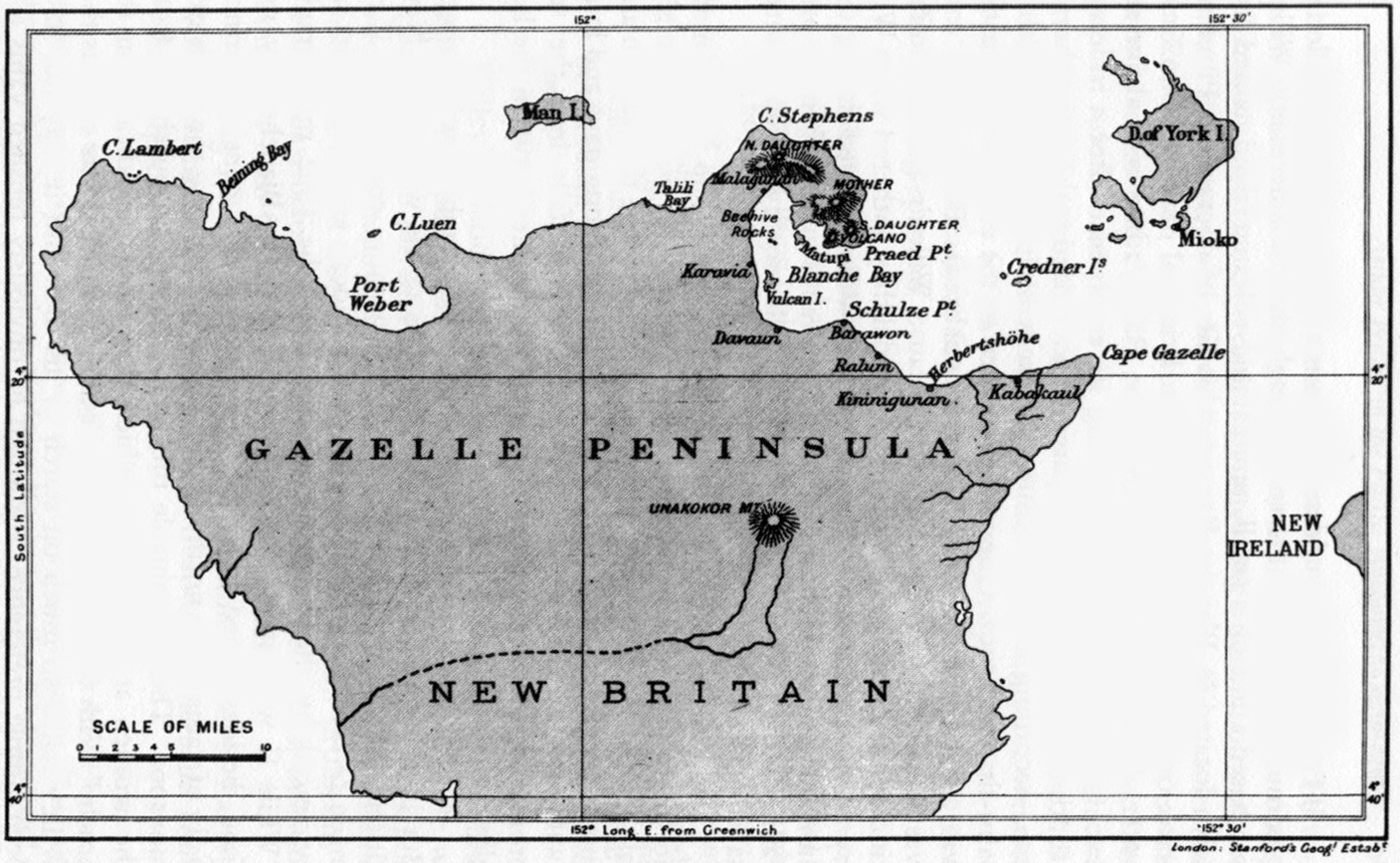
Map of Gazelle Peninsula, where Arthur Willey attempted to catch N. macromphalus
