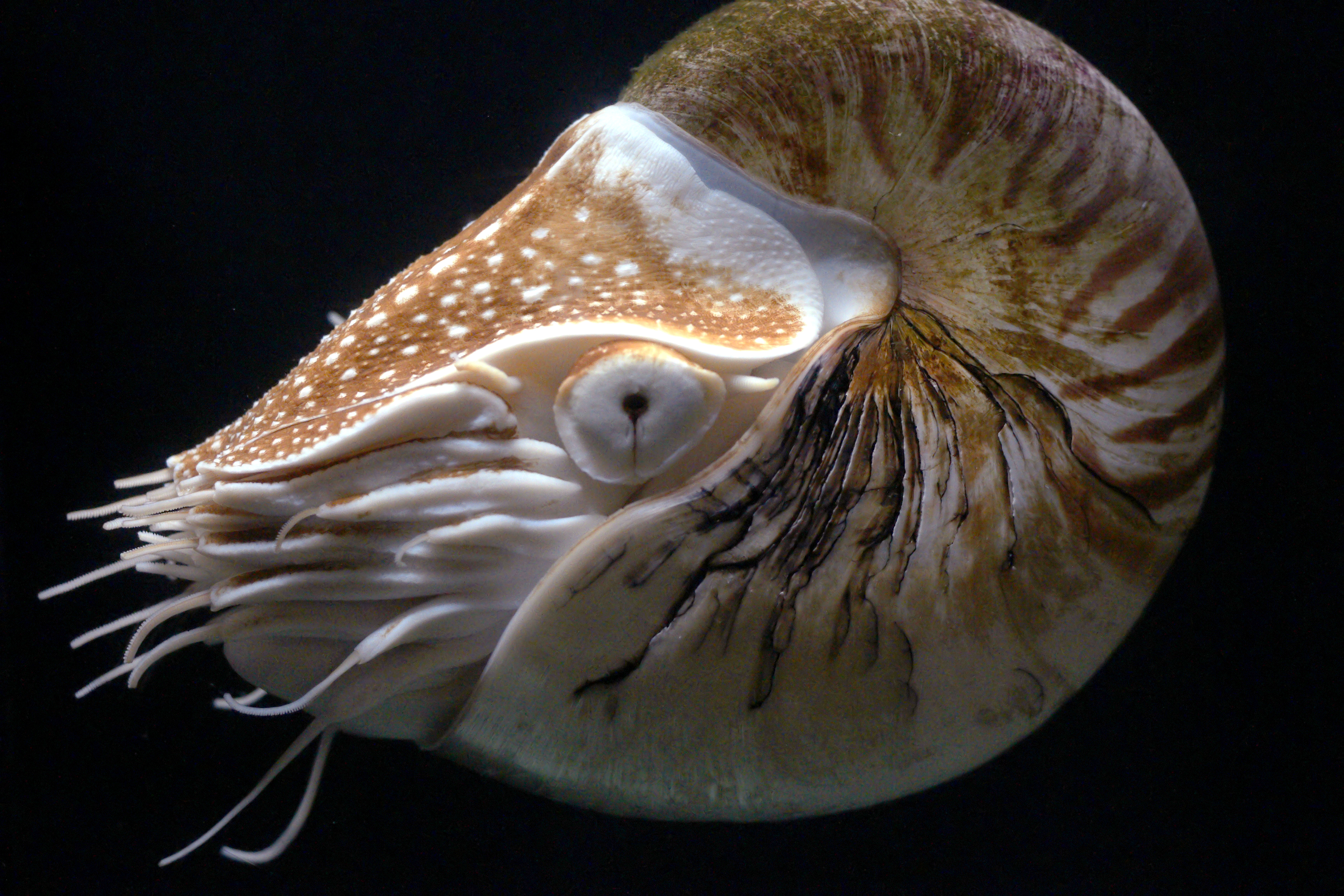
- From the side

Conservation status
- Vulnerable (IUCN 3.1)
- CITES Appendix II

Scientific classification
- Kingdom: Animalia
- Phylum: Mollusca
- Class: Cephalopoda
- Subclass: Nautiloidea
- Order: Nautilida
- Family: Nautilidae
- Genus: Nautilus
- Species: N. pompilius

Binomial name
- Nautilus pompilius Linnaeus, 1758

Subspecies
- Nautilus pompilius pompilius Linnaeus, 1758; Nautilus pompilius suluensis Habe & Okutani, 1988

Synonyms
- Nautilus repertus Iredale, 1944

= Chambered nautilus =

Chambered nautilus Temporal range: Pleistocene–Holocene

Species of nautilus

The chambered nautilus (Nautilus pompilius), also called the pearly nautilus, is the best-known species of nautilus. The shell, when cut away, reveals a lining of lustrous nacre and displays a nearly perfect equiangular spiral, although it is not a golden spiral. The shell exhibits countershading, being light on the bottom and dark on top. This is to help avoid predators, because when seen from above, it blends in with the darkness of the sea, and when seen from below, it blends in with the light coming from above.

The range of the chambered nautilus encompasses much of the south Pacific; It has been found near reefs and on the seafloor off the coasts of Australia, Japan, and Micronesia.

The eyes of the chambered nautilus, like those of all Nautilus species, are more primitive than those of most other cephalopods; the eye has no lens and thus is comparable to a pinhole camera. The species has about 90 cirri (referred to as "tentacles"; see Nautilus § Tentacles) that do not have suckers, differing significantly from the limbs of coleoids. Chambered nautiluses, again like all members of the genus, have a pair of rhinophores located near each eye which detect chemicals, and use olfaction and chemotaxis to find their food.

The oldest fossils of the species are known from Early Pleistocene sediments deposited off the coast of Luzon in the Philippines.

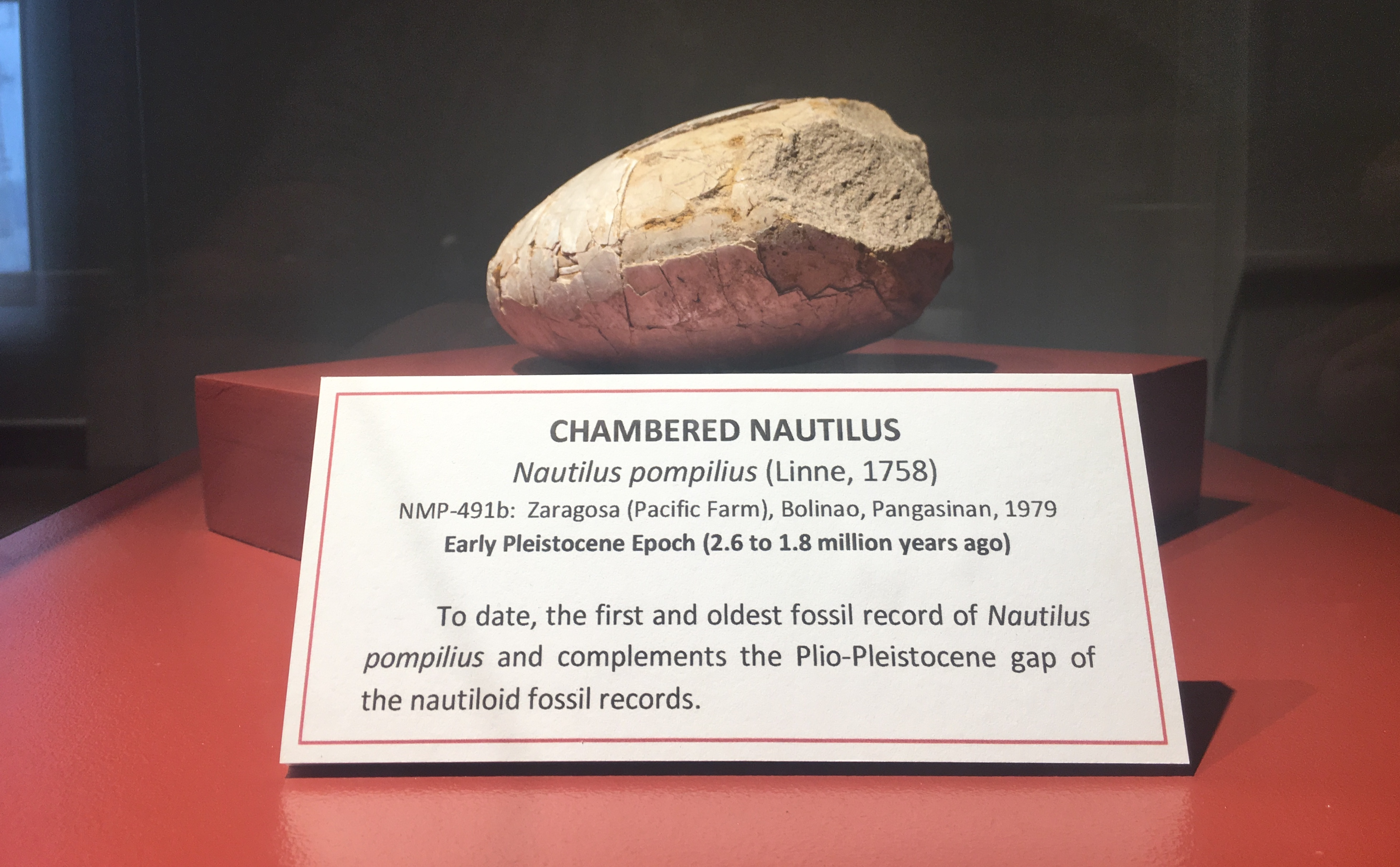
The first and so far oldest known fossil of chambered nautilus, displayed at the Philippine National Museum

Although once thought to be a living fossil, the chambered nautilus is now considered taxonomically very different from ancient ammonites, and the recent fossil record surrounding the species shows more genetic diversity among nautiluses now than has been found since the extinction of the dinosaurs. Indeed, the taxon of the chambered nautilus, Nautilus pompilius, is actually a grouping of tens of different species of nautilus under one name.

All nautilus species are threatened due to overfishing for their shell, which primarily is used for jewelry and other ornamental artifacts. In 2016, they were moved to CITES Appendix II, which restricts international trade, and later the chambered nautilus was recognized as a threatened species under the Endangered Species Act.

== Life cycle ==
Because of their oceanic habitat, studies of their life cycle have primarily been based on captive animals and their eggs have never been seen in the wild. Although nautilus have been kept at public aquariums since the 1950s, the chambered nautilus was first bred in captivity at the Waikiki Aquarium in 1995 (a couple of other nautilus species had been bred earlier) and captive breeding remains a rare event even today. Unlike most cephalopods, the nautilus lacks a larval stage. The eggs are laid in crevices or between corals by the female. The nautilus shell of the young develops inside the egg and breaches the top of the egg before the nautilus fully emerges. Depending on water temperature, the eggs hatch after between 9 and 15 months. In 2017, it was bred at Monterey Bay Aquarium, which managed to film the young emerging from the egg. Like other nautilus but unlike most other cephalopods, chambered nautilus are relatively long-lived and only reach maturity when about 5 years old.

== Diet ==
As a carnivore, it feeds on both underwater carrion and detritus, as well as living shellfish and crab. Mainly scavengers, chambered nautiluses have been described as eating "anything that smells". This food is stored in a stomach-like organ known as a crop, which can store food for a great deal of time without it denaturing.

== Subspecies ==
Two subspecies of N. pompilius have been described: N. p. pompilius and N. p. suluensis.

N. p. pompilius is by far the most common and widespread of all nautiluses. It is sometimes called the emperor nautilus due to its large size. The distribution of N. p. pompilius covers the Andaman Sea east to Fiji and southern Japan south to the Great Barrier Reef. Exceptionally large specimens with shell diameters up to 254 mm (10.0 in) have been recorded from Indonesia and northern Australia. This giant form was described as Nautilus repertus, but most scientists do not consider it a separate species.

N. p. suluensis is a much smaller animal, restricted to the Sulu Sea in the southwestern Philippines, after which it is named. The largest known specimen measured 160 mm in shell diameter.

== Shell geometry ==
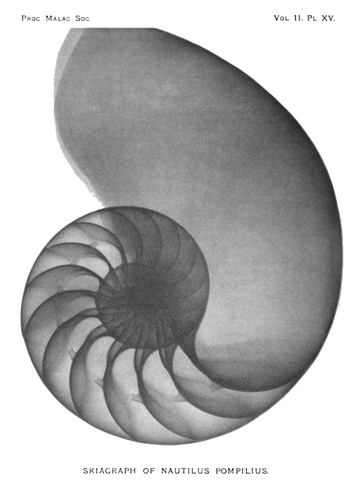
1896 skiagraph (X-ray photograph) of a N. pompilius by James Green & James H. Gardiner, from Proceedings of the Malacological Society of London, Vol. II, Pl. XV, p. 178

The chambered nautilus is often used as an example of the golden spiral. While nautiluses show logarithmic spirals, their ratios range from about 1.24 to 1.43, with an average ratio of about 1.33 to 1. The golden spiral's ratio is 1.618. This is visible when the cut nautilus is inspected.

== Shell function ==
The shell of the chambered nautilus fulfills the function of buoyancy, which allows the nautilus to dive or ascend at will, by controlling the density and volume of the liquid within its shell chambers. This was found during research in New Caledonia on nautiluses whose shell chamber fluid densities were tested at various depths, weeks apart. Generally speaking, chambered nautiluses inhabit a depth around 1000 feet, although further tests demonstrated that they can, and do, dive deeper. However, there are hazards associated with extreme depth for the nautilus: the shells of chambered nautiluses slowly fill with water at such depths, and they are only capable of withstanding depths up to 2000 feet before imploding due to pressure.

The chambered nautilus inhabits different segments of the shell as it grows, continuously growing new, larger "cells" into which it moves its internal organs as it grows in maturity. All of the smaller chambers, once uninhabited, are used in the method described above to regulate depth.

== In literature and art ==
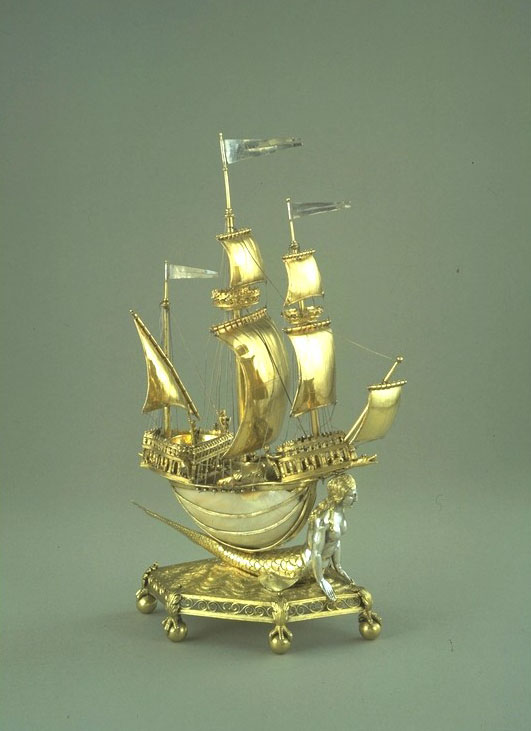
The Burghley Nef, Paris 1520s; the hull is a shell

Nautilus shells were popular items in the Renaissance cabinet of curiosities and were often mounted by goldsmiths on a thin stem to make extravagant nautilus shell cups, such as the Burghley Nef, mainly intended for display, or for ceremonial drinking, rather than for regular use. Small natural history collections were common in mid-19th-century Victorian homes, and chambered nautilus shells were popular decorations.

The chambered nautilus is the title and subject of a poem by Oliver Wendell Holmes, in which he admires the "ship of pearl" and the "silent toil/That spread his lustrous coil/Still, as the spiral grew/He left the past year's dwelling for the new." He finds in the mysterious life and death of the nautilus strong inspiration for his own life and spiritual growth. He concludes:

Build thee more stately mansions, O my soul,
As the swift seasons roll!
Leave thy low-vaulted past!
Let each new temple, nobler than the last,
Shut thee from heaven with a dome more vast,
Till thou at length art free,
Leaving thine outgrown shell by life's unresting sea!

A painting by Andrew Wyeth, entitled Chambered Nautilus, shows a woman in a canopied bed; the composition and proportions of the bed and the window behind it mirror those of a chambered nautilus lying on a nearby table.

The popular Russian rock band Nautilus Pompilius (Russian: Наутилус Помпилиус) is named after the species.

American composer and commentator Deems Taylor wrote a cantata entitled The Chambered Nautilus in 1916.

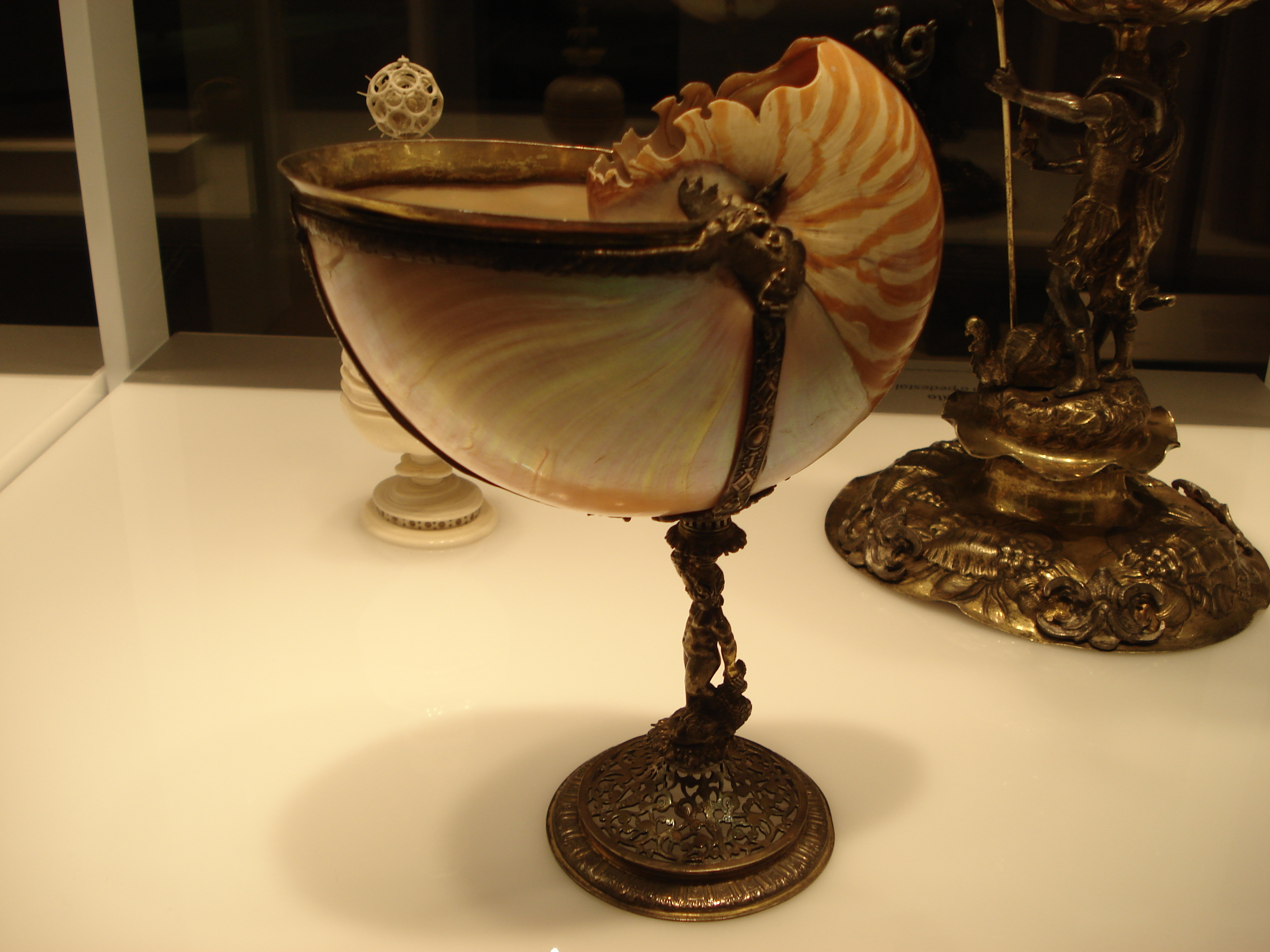
16th-century Northern Mannerist nautilus cup

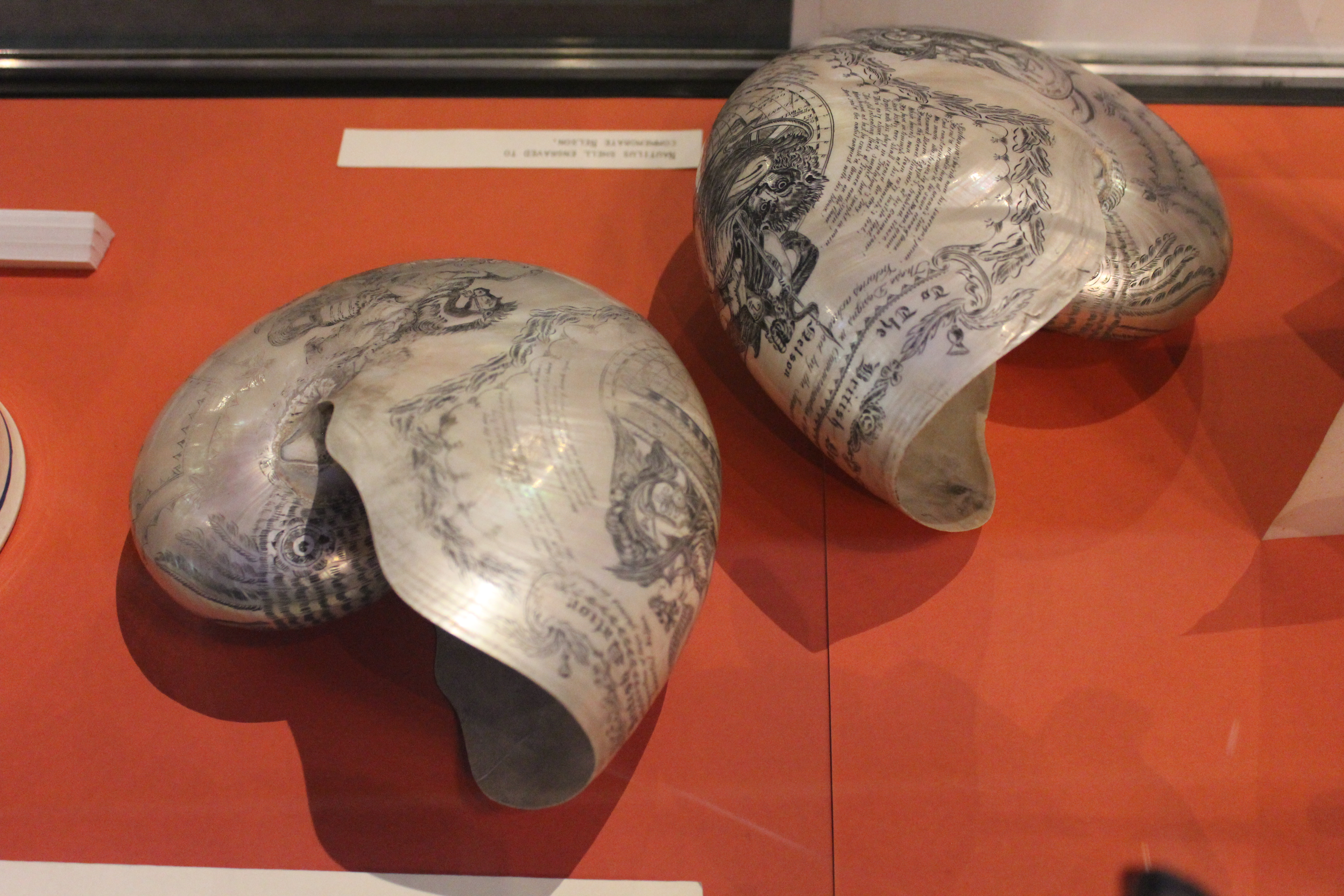
Nautilus shells engraved to commemorate Horatio Nelson, displayed at Monmouth Museum

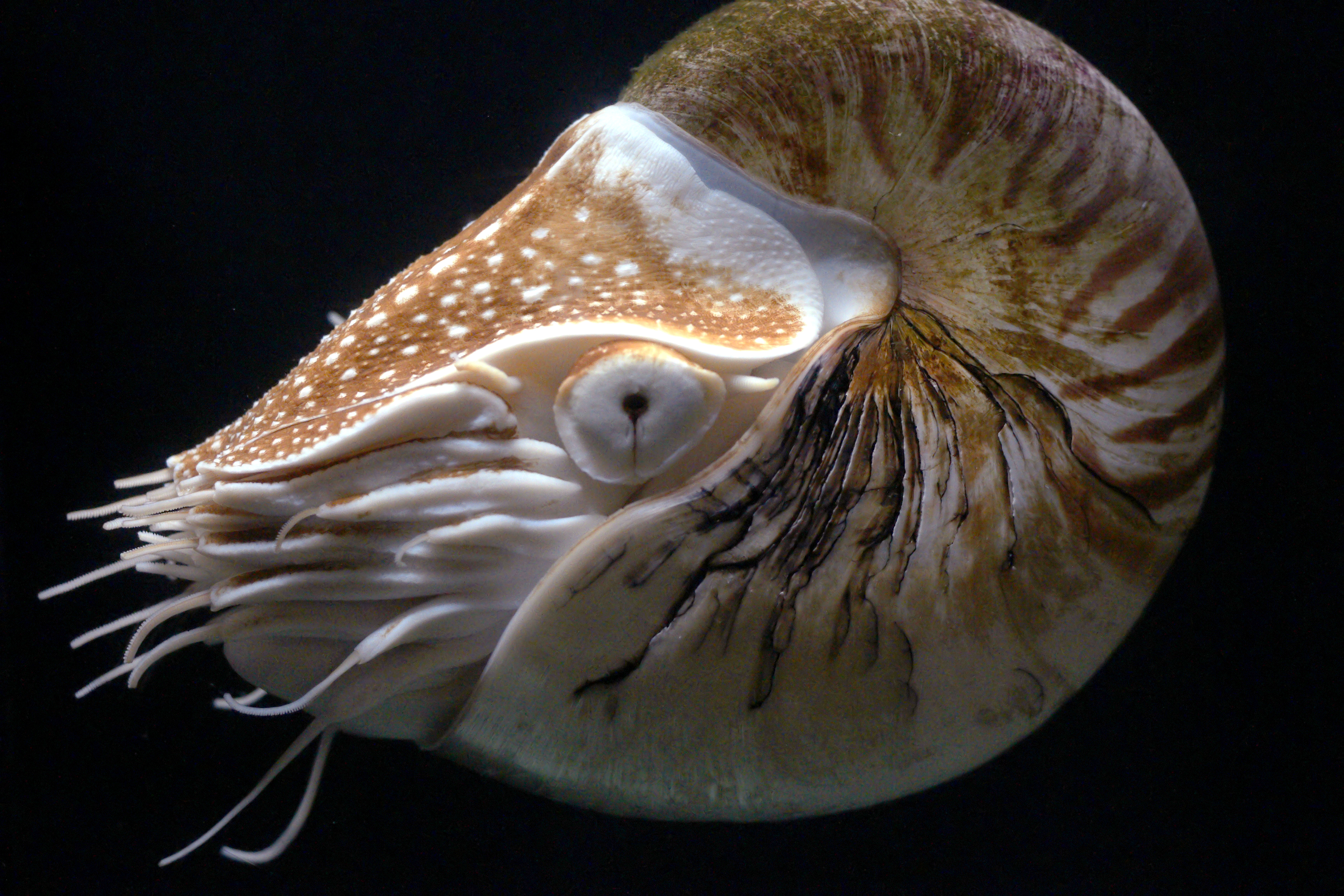
A big nautilus

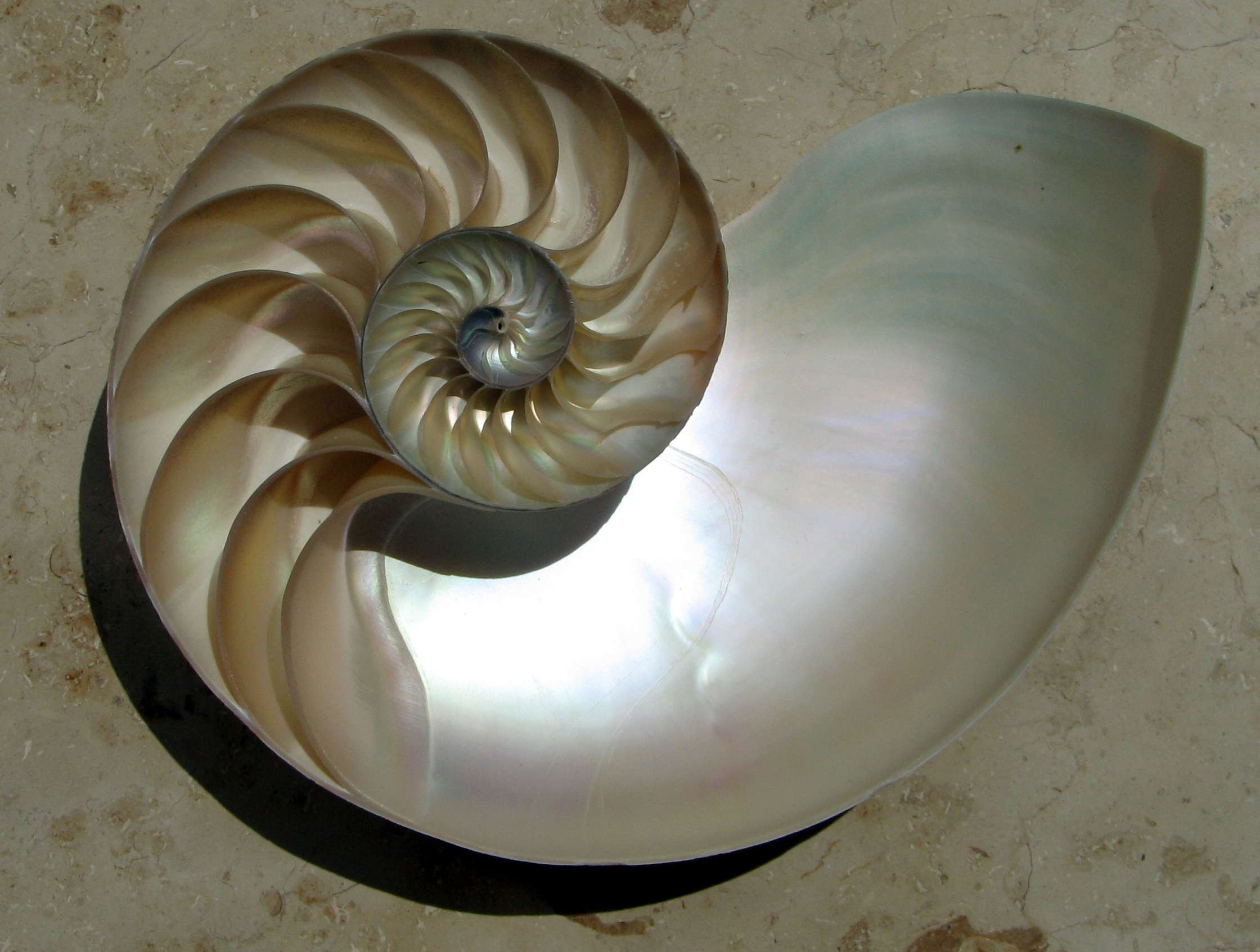
Cutaway of a nautilus shell showing the chambers

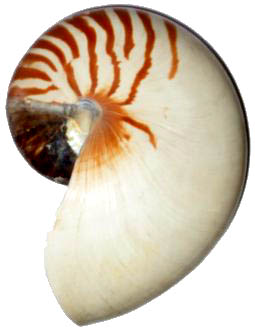
Empty nautilus shell, whole

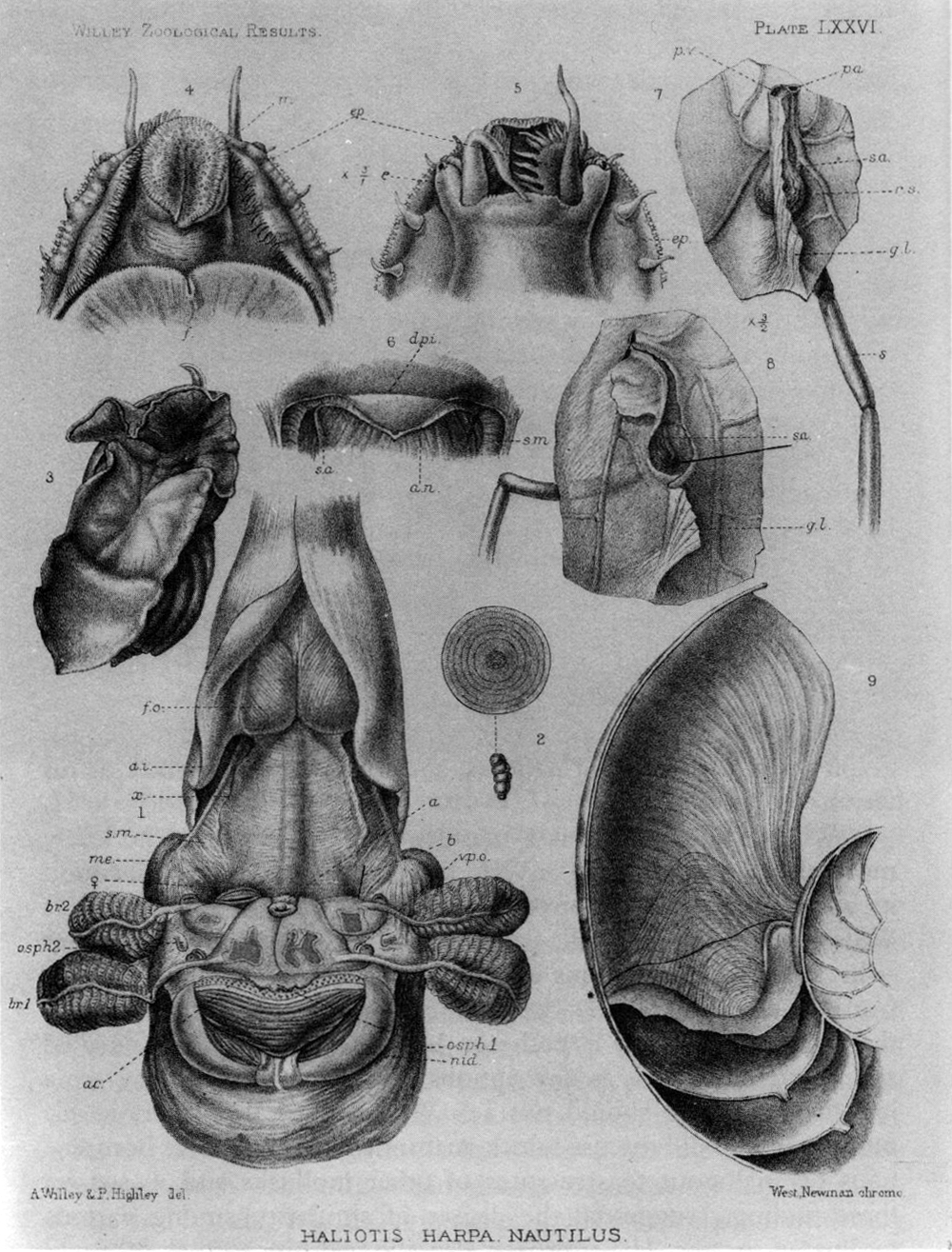
Internal anatomy of Nautilus pompilius
