= Jan van der Hoeven =

Dutch biologist (1801–1868)

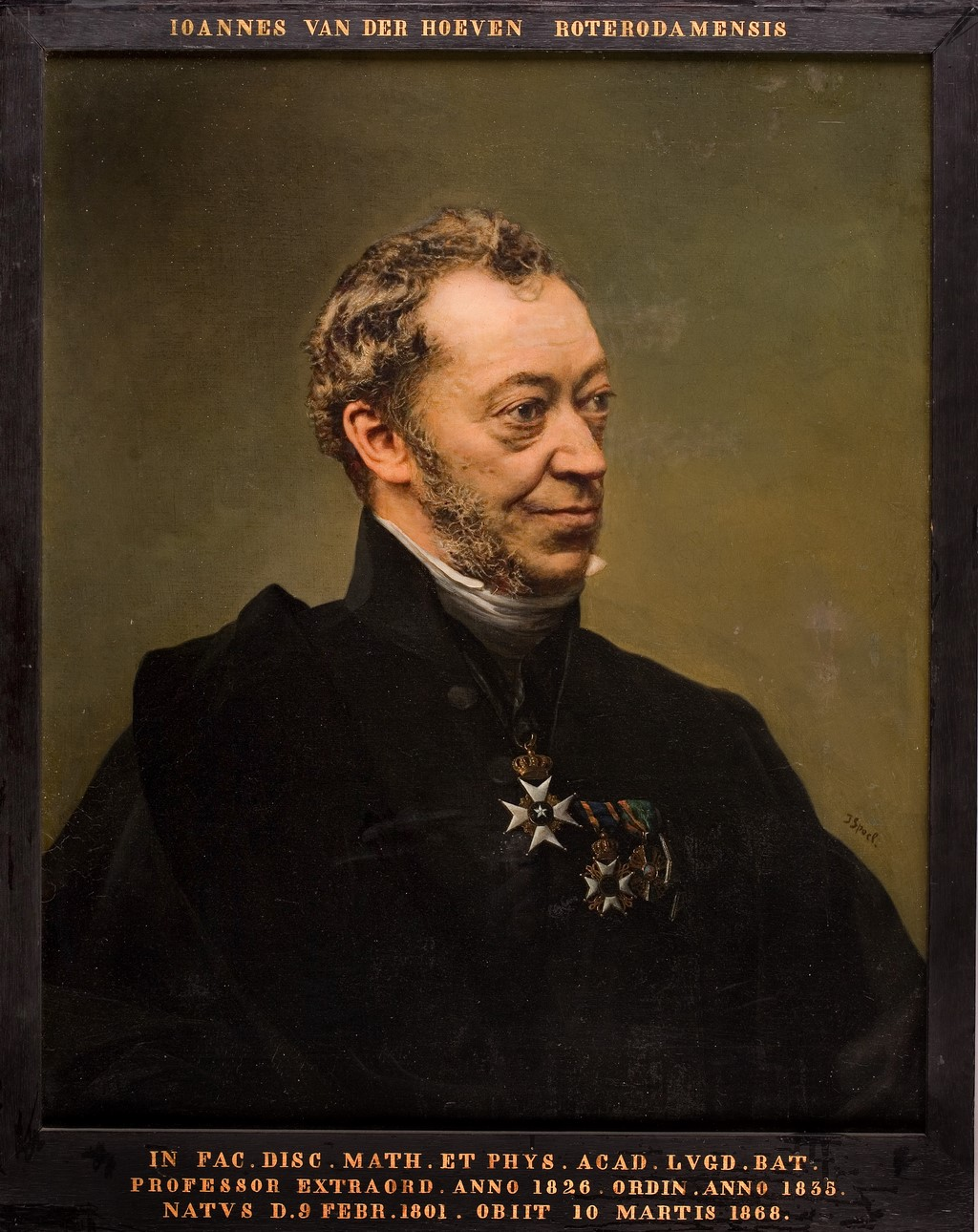
- Portrait by the University of Leiden
- Born: 9 February 1801; Rotterdam, Netherlands
- Died: 10 March 1868 (aged 67); Leiden, Netherlands
- Notable work: Handboek der Dierkunde (1827–1833)
- Spouse: Anna van Stolk (m. 1826)
- Scientific career
- Fields: Zoology
- Workplaces: University of Leiden

Jan van der Hoeven (9 February 1801 – 10 March 1868) was a Dutch zoologist. His most famous book is Handboek der Dierkunde (1827–1833), translated into German and English (by prof. Clark). He wrote as readily about crocodiles as about butterflies, lancelets and lemurs. His research on the nautilus resulted in the discovery of a secondary sexual organ of unknown function which was then named after him as Hoeven's organ or Van der Hoeven's organ.

== Biography ==
Jan van der Hoeven came from a wealthy family of merchants in Rotterdam. In 1819 he moved to Leiden. In 1822 he got a degree in physics and in 1824 in medicine. After a visit to Paris he started working as a family doctor in Rotterdam, but in 1826 he was appointed Professor of Zoology and Mineralogy at the University of Leiden. He married in that year to Anna van Stolk. In his youth Van der Hoeven was influenced by and paid tribute to the German philosopher Johann Gottfried Herder and he was friendly with Willem Bilderdijk, a prominent Dutch lawyer, author and historian, known for his Revivalism. Two of his brothers were also professor: Abraham was a Remonstrant theologian, Cornelis a physician.

By the 19th century it had become impossible to understand and comprehend all knowledge, but Van der Hoeven was a rather old fashioned scientist, (representing the Biedermeier era) and a generalist: neither specializing, nor becoming a theoreticist. In 1834 he started a magazine in natural history and physiology (Tijdschrift voor natuurlijke geschiedenis en physiologie). Van der Hoeven was also involved in education, writing a biology book for pupils in secondary school, although, paradoxically, he was one of the last professors in Leiden to teach in Latin. In 1860 he asked permission to leave the university. He died in Leiden eight years later. In 1858, he was elected a foreign member of the Royal Swedish Academy of Sciences. In 1864 he published the Latin biology textbook Philosophia Zoologica. In 1832 he became correspondent of the Royal Institute and in 1845 member. In 1851 the Royal Institute became the Royal Netherlands Academy of Arts and Sciences.

== Tribute ==
Leptobarbus hoevenii (Bleeker 1851) is named in honor of Bleeker's fellow Dutchman, "le célèbre professeur de zoologie".

Hemigobius hoevenii (Bleeker, 1851) was also named for him.

== See also ==
- Category:Taxa named by Jan van der Hoeven

== Works ==
- Handboek der Dierkunde (1827–1833), first edition, Part 1, Part 2, Plates.
- Handboek der Dierkunde (1846–1855), second edition, Part 1, Part 2. English translation: Handbook of zoology (1856–1858). German translation: Handbuch der zoologie (1850–1856).
