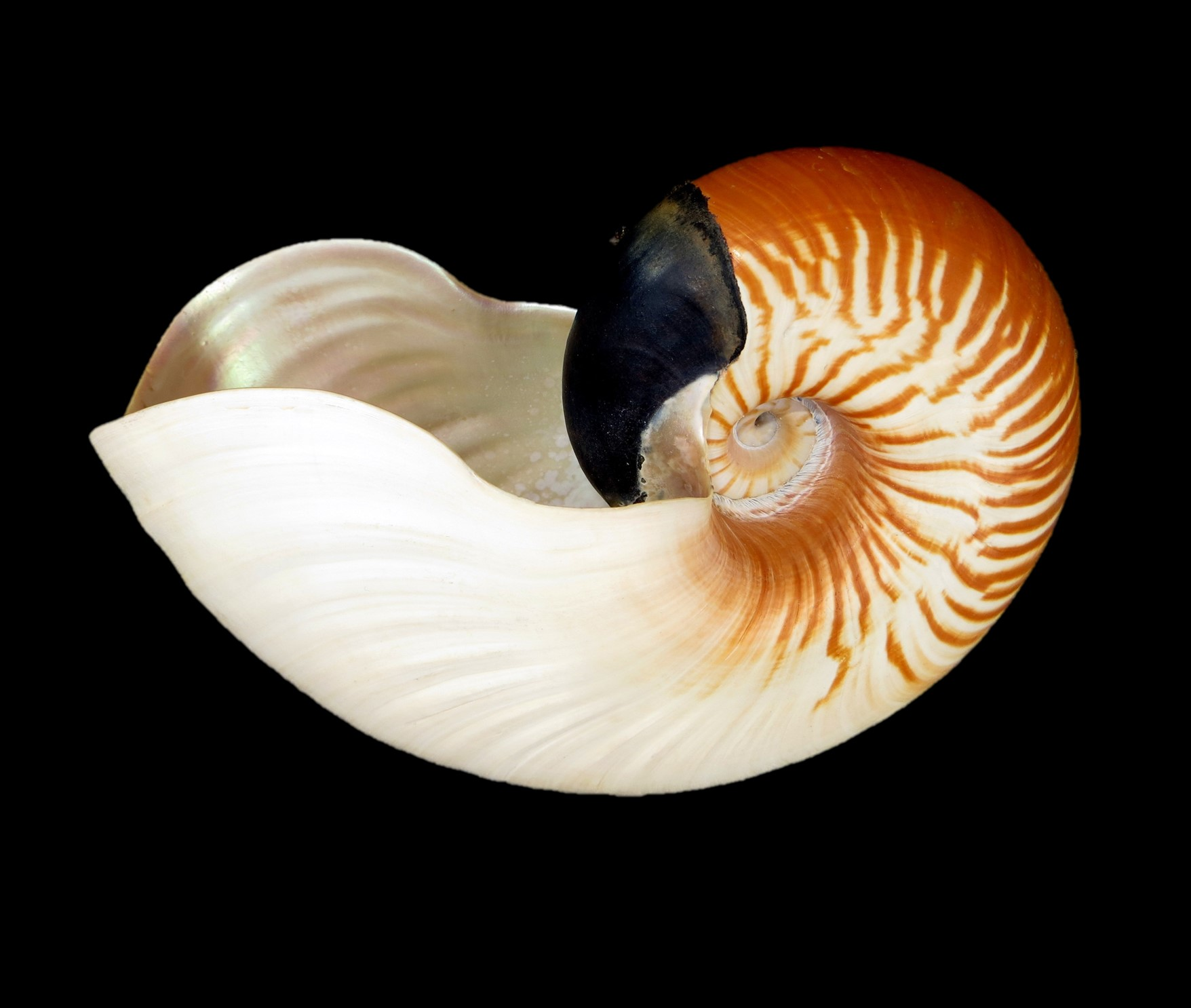

Conservation status
- Data Deficient (IUCN 3.1)
- CITES Appendix II

Scientific classification
- Kingdom: Animalia
- Phylum: Mollusca
- Class: Cephalopoda
- Subclass: Nautiloidea
- Order: Nautilida
- Family: Nautilidae
- Genus: Allonautilus
- Species: A. perforatus

Binomial name
- Allonautilus perforatus (Conrad, 1847)

Synonyms
- Nautilus perforatus Conrad, 1847

= Allonautilus perforatus =

Species of mollusc

Allonautilus perforatus, also known as the Bali chambered nautilus or the Indonesian nautilus, is a proposed species of nautilus native to the waters around Bali, Indonesia. It is known only from drifted shells and, as such, is the least studied of the seven recognized nautilus species. Thus, not much is known about it outside of the shell.

== Habitat and distribution ==
The nautilus is reported to live on the coastal reefs of Bali and Papua New Guinea. They have been reported to live in nearby deep-water habitats as well. A. perforatus has been estimated to live at depths of 100~600 meters much like other extant Nautiloids.

Ultimately little is known about the exact distribution of A. perforatus compared with the more abundant relatives such as A. scrobiculatus. Shells of the nautilus are sold in Balinese market places and tend to be less common. Newer specimens found via the shell trade may have been live-taken by fishers, which is raising hopes among scientists for obtaining live specimens for study.

Reports from these markers detail that the shells have notable Octopus borings in their chambers. Markings indicate that the nautilus obtained are shells that have drifted onto the shoreline. Likely due to predation by Octopus, the shells are empty upon arrival.

Due to the A. scrobiculatus specimen being isolated in the region of Papua New Guinea, in addition to being close relatives, it is thought that both species of the nautilus are organisms that are isolated geographically.

== Commercial use of shells ==
Known to be valued in the commercial market as collectibles, nautilus shells and are traded around the world. A. perforatus are traded locally in Bali, Indonesia. These markets tend to last for a brief period of time before eventually becoming nonfunctional.

In addition to their trading and commercial value as souvenirs, shells are also owned by museums for collection.

== Taxonomy ==
Little is known about wild specimens of A. perforatus and this nautilus has mostly been distinguished by shells that have drifted onto land, and more recently, specimens that have been obtained via the Balinese shell trade. Thus, not much is known about this particular creature. The genus Allonautilus contains only two species, A. perforatus and A. scrobiculatus, with a more restricted distribution overall than the genus Nautilus.

=== Taxonomic Status ===
The current taxonomic status of A. perforatus is currently disputed among scholars. The World Register of Marine Species (WoRMS) describes the status as nomen dubium, indicating that the name is of uncertain application and the species is not officially recognized.

== Morphology ==
Like other nautilus species, A. perforatus has a coiled shell covering its internal body. The shell has multiple chambers, the outermost chamber being where the nautilus lives. In addition the organism possesses tentacles that form two rings around its mouth.

A. perforatus shows a shell shape and coloration very similar to that of A. scrobiculatus and shares with this species the characteristic open umbilicus. However, it bears highly distinctive shell-ribbing, which is unique among extant ectocochleate cephalopods, and lacks scrobiculate shell sculpture.

Until recently, it was not known whether or not A. perforatus possessed the thick encrusting layer (periostracum) characteristic of A. scrobiculatus. Newer specimens have shown to have a (periostracum). Maximum known shell diameter is around 180 mm. Sexual dimorphism are apparent as females tend to be smaller in size. The shell also possesses a series of plicae (ribs) on the sides of the body chamber near the organism's aperture. Plicae tend to be 30mm long and its crests 10mm apart, and are explicitly expressed on both the inside and outside of the shell.
