= Van der Hoeven's organ =

Van der Hoeven's organ is the infrabuccal lamellar organ in the adult male of genus Nautilus. It consists of a pair of fleshy narrow parallel lobes each containing 15-19 lamellae. It is analogous to Owen's laminated organ of the females, which is also infrabuccal and also lamellar, though females have an additional secondary sexual organ, the organ of Valenciennes. It along with the spadix and antispadix comprise the secondary sexual organs of the male. Its function has been described as possibly olfactory, but since its discovery in the mid nineteenth century its exact function, like that of its counterpart, has never been adequately explained— this is why it remains named after the naturalist who first described it rather than having an organ name like "heart" or "gill".
