= Spadix =

Spadix may refer to:

- Spadix (botany), a reproductive organ of some genera of plants
- Spadix (zoology), a similarly shaped secondary sexual organ of some genera of cephalopods and hydrozoans
