= Osmeña =

Osmeña may refer to:

- Sergio Osmeña (1878–1961), President of the Philippines
  - Sergio Osmeña, Zamboanga del Norte, a municipality in the Philippines
  - Sergio Osmeña Jr. (1918–1984), his son, senator
  - John Henry Osmeña (1935–2021), also known as Sonny Osmeña, his grandson, senator
  - Lito Osmeña (Emilio Mario Renner Osmeña Jr, 1938–2021), governor of Cebu, his grandson
  - Serge Osmeña (Sergio de la Rama Osmeña III) (born 1943), senator, his grandson
  - Tomas Osmeña (born 1948), mayor of Cebu City, his grandson
- Osmeña pearl, made by polishing the shell of a nautilus

== See also ==
- Osmeña Boulevard, in Cebu City, Philippines
- Osmeña Highway, in Metro Manila, Philippines
- Bando Osmeña – Pundok Kauswagan, a Philippines political party
