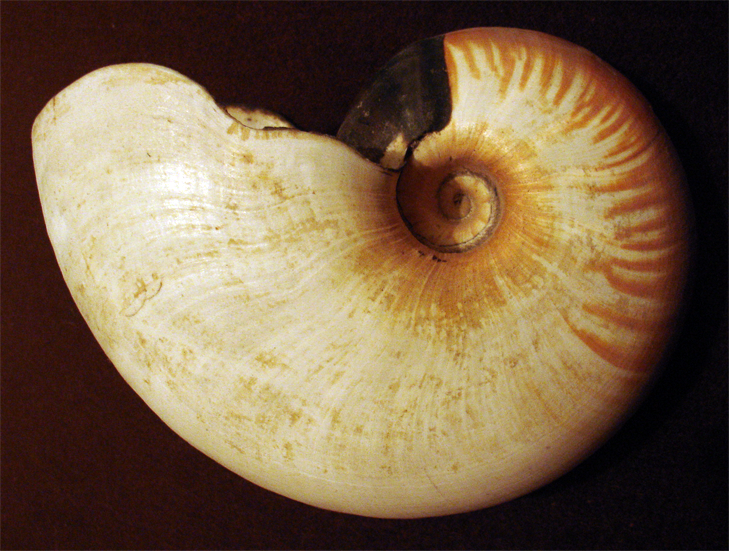
- Allonautilus scrobiculatus shell with periostracum removed

Scientific classification
- Kingdom: Animalia
- Phylum: Mollusca
- Class: Cephalopoda
- Subclass: Nautiloidea
- Order: Nautilida
- Family: Nautilidae
- Genus: Allonautilus; Ward & Saunders, 1997

Type species
- Allonautilus scrobiculatus

Species
- Allonautilus scrobiculatus; Allonautilus perforatus

= Allonautilus =

Genus of cephalopods

The genus Allonautilus contains two species of nautiluses, which have a significantly different morphology from those placed in the sister taxon Nautilus. Mitogenome comparisons between Allonautilus and Nautilus confirm this split as the oldest divergence among living nautiloids, justifying their placement in separate genera.

Live individuals of Allonautilus scrobiculatus have only been collected in Papua New Guinea and the Solomon Islands. Little is known about their biology because they live in deep waters, whereas the better-understood genus Nautilus lives closer to the surface. Allonautilus perforatus is only known from shells washed ashore with no observations of live specimens to date. Despite the rarity of live sightings of individuals of this genus, genetic diversity among the limited collected live samples indicate relatively large populations persisting for at least Allonautilus scrobiculatus.

The entire family Nautilidae, including all species in the genera Nautilus and Allonautilus, was listed on Appendix II of the Convention on International Trade in Endangered Species of Wild Fauna and Flora (CITES).

== Species ==
Image	Scientific name	Common name	Distribution
	Allonautilus perforatus	Bali chambered nautilus	Bali; Papua New Guinea
	Allonautilus scrobiculatus	Crusty nautilus	Papua New Guinea; Solomon Islands
