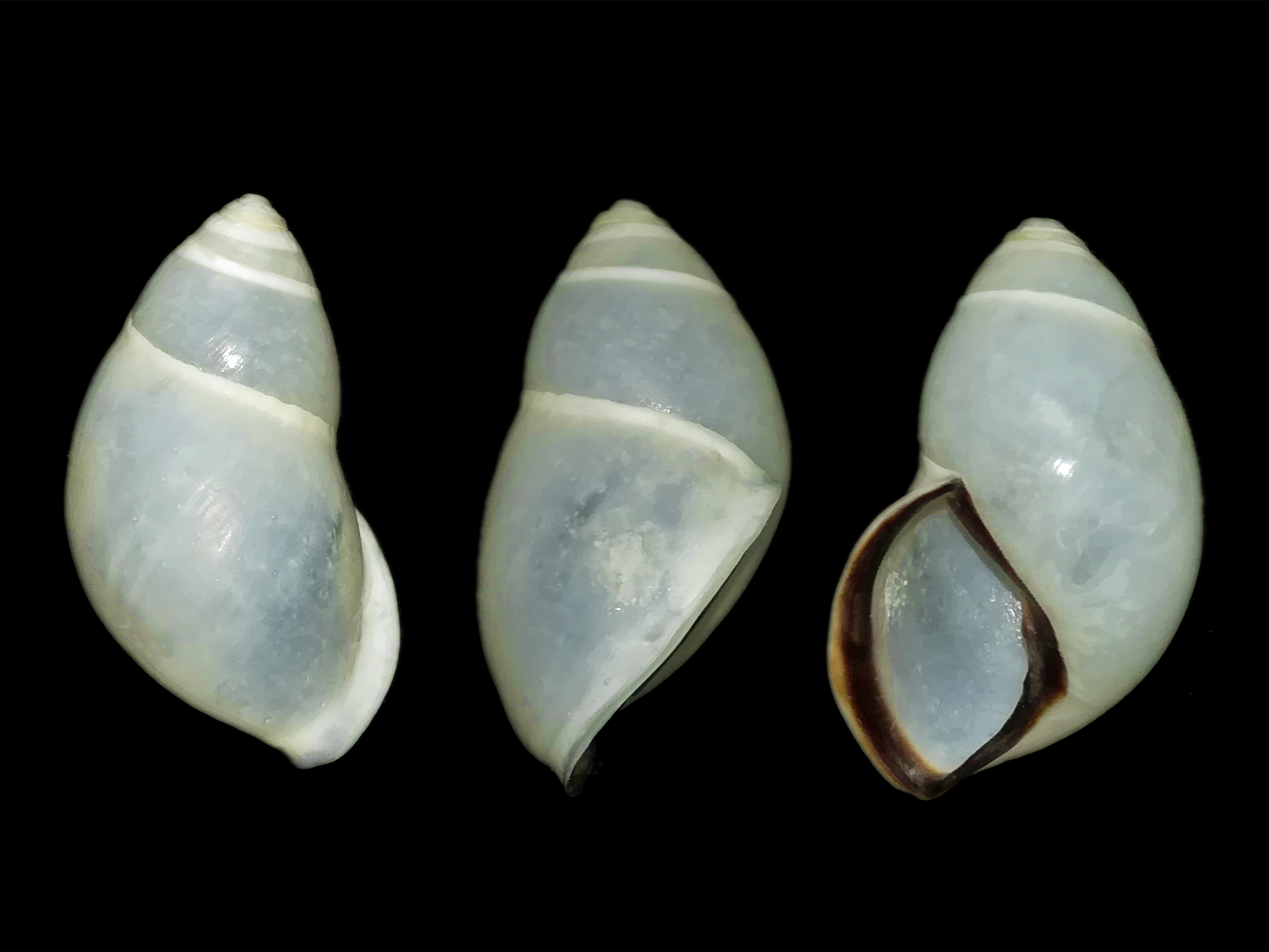

Scientific classification
- Domain: Eukaryota
- Kingdom: Animalia
- Phylum: Mollusca
- Class: Gastropoda
- Order: Stylommatophora
- Family: Camaenidae
- Genus: Amphidromus
- Species: A. thachi

Binomial name
- Amphidromus thachi Huber, 2015

Synonyms
- Amphidromus (Amphidromus) thachi F. Huber, 2015 alternative representation; Amphidromus (Amphidromus) thachi krisi Thach, 2018 junior subjective synonym; Amphidromus thachi krisi Thach, 2018 junior subjective synonym

= Amphidromus thachi =

Species of medium-sized air-breathing tree snail

Amphidromus thachi is a species of medium-sized air-breathing tree snail, an arboreal gastropod mollusk in the family Camaenidae.

== Description ==
The length of the shell varies between 25 mm and 30 mm, its diameter between 17 mm and 18.5 mm.

The shell exhibits chirality dimorphism. It ranges from thin to slightly thickened, and presents a conical shape. The spire is short and conical with white or pale coloration. The apex appears acute without a black spot on its tip. Comprising six to seven little convex to smooth whorls, the shell displays a wide and shallow suture. The body whorl is well rounded to slightly elongated and features a less prominent umbilical hump. The periostracum is thin and corneous; varices are absent. The shell color is uniformly whitish to pale cream, with a subsutural band that appears opaque white. The parietal callus is thickened, whitish, and translucent or dark to dark brown. The aperture is elliptical to obliquely elliptical with a prominent anterior notch; the inner side of the outer wall is whitish. The peristome is thickened and slightly expanded but not reflected; the outer lip is whitish or shows dark to dark brown coloration. The columella is whitish or dark, running shortly straight and then bending anteriorly. The umbilicus is imperforate.

The radula features teeth arranged in anteriorly pointed V-shaped rows. The central tooth is monocuspid and spatulate with a truncated cusp. The lateral teeth are bicuspid; the endocone appears slightly smaller than the ectocone, curved, with a wide notch and a dull cusp; the ectocone is large with a curved to dull cusp. The lateral teeth gradually transform into asymmetric tricuspid marginal teeth. The outermost teeth possess a small and curved cusp on the ectocone; the endocone and mesocone exhibit curved cusps.

The genital organs feature a relatively short atrium. The penis is slender, conical, and short, measuring approximately half the length of the vagina. The penial retractor muscle appears thickened and inserts on the epiphallus close to the penis. The epiphallus is a long, slender tube, almost the same diameter as the penis. The flagellum is short, extending from the epiphallus and terminating in a weakly coiled structure. The appendix is a short, slender tube, similar in length to the flagellum and approximately half the length of the epiphallus. The vas deferens is a slender tube passing from the free oviduct and terminating at the epiphallus-flagellum junction (Fig. 18A, B). The internal wall of the penis is corrugated, exhibiting a series of thickened and smooth-surfaced longitudinal penial pilasters that form a fringe around the penial wall, and presents a nearly smooth wall around the base of the penial verge. The penial verge is short and conical with a smooth surface.

== Distribution ==
This species is endemic to Central Vietnam, Khánh Hòa Province.

== Habitat ==
In and around trees.

== Etymology ==
This species is named after Vietnamese malacologist, Dr. Nguyễn Ngọc Thạch.

== Sources ==
- Nguyễn, Ngọc Thạch (2017). New Shells of Southeastern Asia. 48HrBooks Company. p. 69. ISBN 978-0-578-19432-5.
- Thach N.N. (2017). New shells of Southeast Asia. Sea shells & Land snails. Akron, Ohio: 48HrBooks Company. 128 pp.
- Thach, N. N. (2018). New shells of South Asia. Seashells-Landsnails-Freshwater Shells. 3 New Genera, 132 New Species & Subspecies. 48HRBooks Company, Akron, Ohio, USA. 173 pp.
