= Strionautilus =

Strionautilus Temporal range: Cretaceous

Scientific classification
- Kingdom: Animalia
- Phylum: Mollusca
- Class: Cephalopoda
- Subclass: Nautiloidea
- Order: Nautilida
- Family: Nautilidae
- Genus: †Strionautilus; Shimanskiy (1951)

Species
- S. pondicherriensis (Blandford, 1866)

Synonyms
- Nautilus pondicherriensis (Blandford, 1866)

Extinct genus of nautiloids

Strionautilus is an extinct nautilid cephalopod. Fossils are found in Late Cretaceous marine strata of Russia and India.
