= Pseudocenoceras =

Pseudocenoceras Temporal range: Tithonian – Maastrichtian

Scientific classification
- Kingdom: Animalia
- Phylum: Mollusca
- Class: Cephalopoda
- Subclass: Nautiloidea
- Order: Nautilida
- Family: Nautilidae
- Genus: †Pseudocenoceras; Spath (1927)

Diversity
- 12 species

Extinct genus of molluscs

Pseudocenoceras is an extinct genus of nautilid that belongs to the family Nautilidae. It lived in Europe and Asia during the Jurassic and Cretaceous periods from the Tithonian to Maastrichtian ages. The species P. archiacianum is known from the Albian age from Alpstein, Switzerland.

== Taxonomy ==
=== Species ===
This genus currently contains 12 described species. They are listed below:

- Pseudocenoceras applanatum
- Pseudocenoceras archiacianum
- Pseudocenoceras campichei
- Pseudocenoceras fittoni
- Pseudocenoceras incautum
- Pseudocenoceras largilliertianum
- Pseudocenoceras nomenclator
- Pseudocenoceras procerum
- Pseudocenoceras proximum
- Pseudocenoceras supervacuum
- Pseudocenoceras warsanofievie
- Pseudocenoceras xenium
