= Carinonautilus =

Carinonautilus Temporal range: Aptian–Santonian

Scientific classification
- Kingdom: Animalia
- Phylum: Mollusca
- Class: Cephalopoda
- Subclass: Nautiloidea
- Order: Nautilida
- Family: Nautilidae
- Genus: †Carinonautilus; Spengler, 1910

Type species
- Carinonautilus ariyalurensis Spengler 1910

Extinct genus of molluscs

Carinonautilus is a genus of extinct, Middle Cretaceous nautilid with a very involute, compressed shell in which the whorl section is higher than wide, umbilicus is small and shallow, or flanks converge on a narrow venter that has a rounded keel. A furrow on either side marks the ventro-lateral shoulder.

The genus was erected by Spengler in 1910 on the basis of the holotype, found in Middle Cretaceous strata from India.
