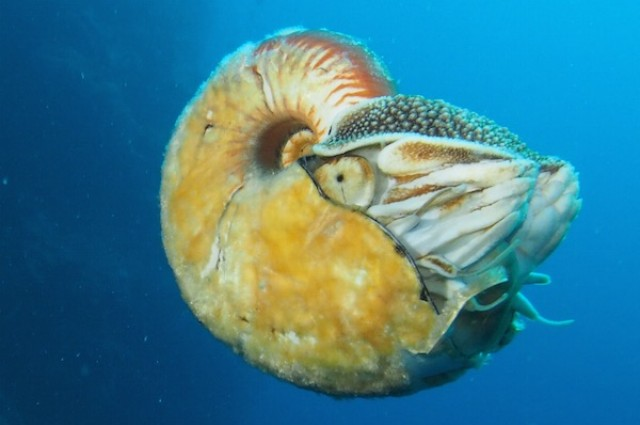
- Allonautilus scrobiculatus off the coast of Papua New Guinea

Conservation status
- Data Deficient (IUCN 3.1)
- CITES Appendix II

Scientific classification
- Kingdom: Animalia
- Phylum: Mollusca
- Class: Cephalopoda
- Subclass: Nautiloidea
- Order: Nautilida
- Family: Nautilidae
- Genus: Allonautilus
- Species: A. scrobiculatus

Binomial name
- Allonautilus scrobiculatus (Lightfoot, 1786)

Synonyms
- Nautilus scrobiculatus Lightfoot, ?Nautilus umbilicatus Linnaeus, 1758

= Allonautilus scrobiculatus =

Species of cephalopod known as the crusty nautilus or fuzzy nautilus

Allonautilus scrobiculatus, also known as the crusty nautilus or fuzzy nautilus, is a species of nautilus native to the waters around New Guinea, specifically New Britain and Milne Bay, and the Solomon Islands. A. scrobiculatus is recognizable by the large open umbilicus, which is around 20% of the shell diameter at its widest point. This species, along with the closely related A. perforatus, were originally placed in the genus Nautilus, but have recently been given their own genus on the account of significant morphological differences. The most obvious are features of the shell, including crease and an encrusting layer (periostracum) that covers most of the shell. Gills and reproductive structures also differ significantly from members of the genus Nautilus. The shell is usually up to around 18 cm in diameter, although the largest specimen ever recorded measured 21.5 cm. The species was thought to have gone extinct after 1986, but was rediscovered in July 2015.

== Taxonomy ==
The genus Allonautilus, which contains a mere 2 species, is a sister genus of the Nautilus which contains 11 species, 5 of which are widely accepted as being distinct. The Allonautilus is very understudied and not much is known about it. However, the more commonly known sister genus, the Nautilus, has been known to natural historians since the renaissance. Nautiluses show very little speciation within the genus and are a distant cousin to the squid and octopus.

== Description ==
A. scrobiculatus' close lineage with nautiluses is juxtaposed by their very distinct morphological features which differ greatly from that of the nautilus. A very distinct feature that one will immediately notice is the organism's thick, hairy, slime-covered shell. A. scrobiculatus is covered with white, irregularly shaped, multipronged papillae which extend from the surface of its hood.

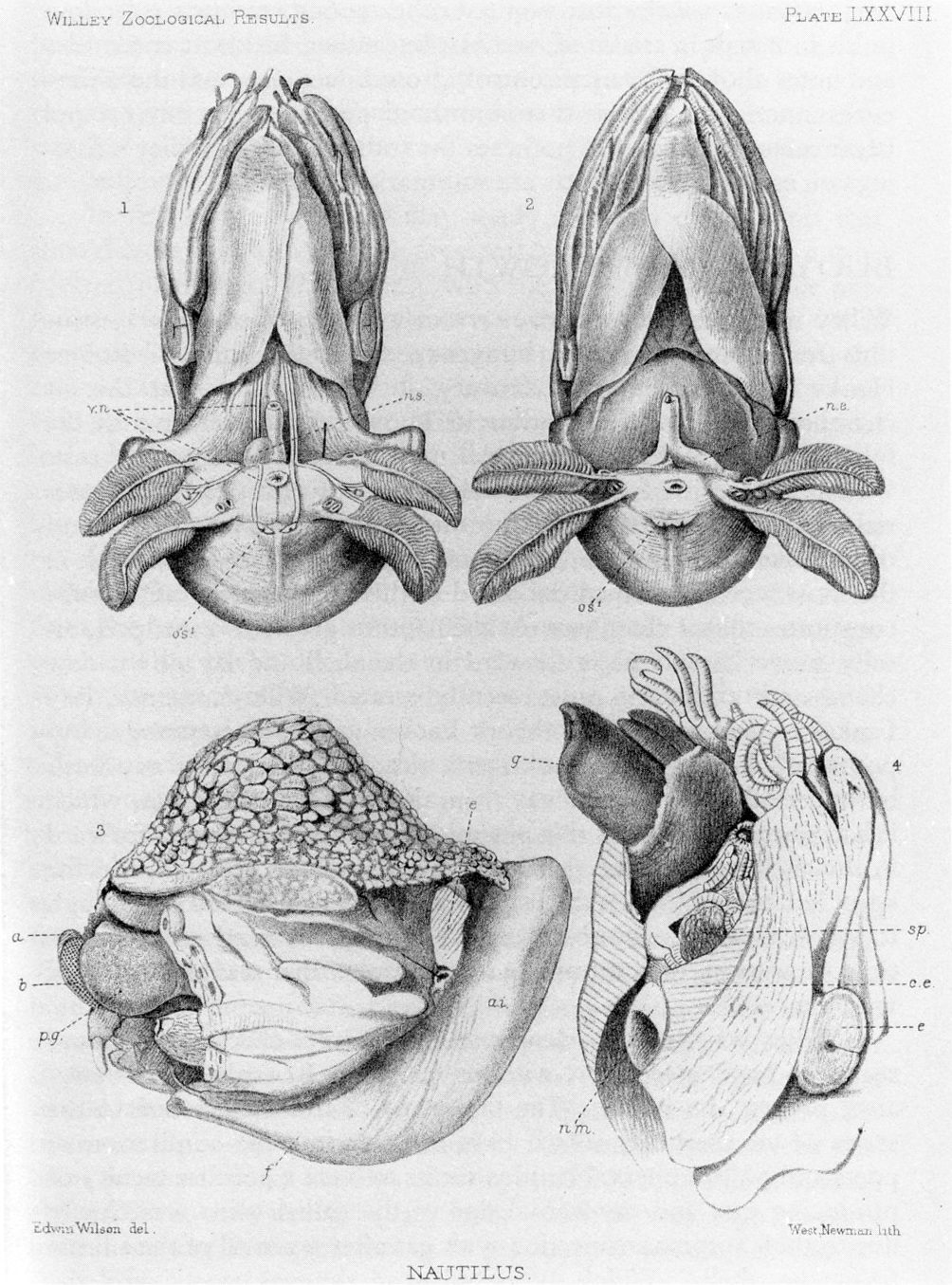
The first illustration of the internal anatomy of Allonautilus scrobiculatus from a 1912 monograph by Arthur Willey.

In addition, it possesses a scrobiculate shell shape, meaning the shells have numerous grooves made into them unlike the Allonautilus perforatus, the only other organism in its genus; other than this, these two organisms share a very similar shell shape and coloration. A. scrobiculatus' gills are similar in structure to those of the nautilus, however, differ in size proving smaller, with less folioles, in similarly sized nautilus specimens.

=== Periostracum ===
An unusual feature of Allonautilus scrobiculatus is its periostracum or "shell skin". The "shaggy" periostracum is present on freshly caught samples, and is thickly interlayered, resembling slimy hair.

Allonautilus scrobiculatus, or otherwise known as the crusty nautilus or fuzzy nautilus is a species of cephalopod. A. scrobiculatus' most recently sighting was in July 2015 by biologist Peter Ward of the University of Washington. Ward's colleague, Bruce Saunders, a geologist from Bryn Mawr College was the one who had initially sighted the organism in 1984.

== Distribution and habitat ==
A. scrobiculatus is primarily found in waters surrounding Papua New Guinea and the Solomon Islands. It tends to live in a very narrow range at further depths (roughly 500–1,300 ft), eluding many researchers and scientists. This is a result of the species' intolerance to heat making it unable to live in too shallow of waters and the species' "fail depth", meaning it will die if venturing into too deep of waters.
