= Osmeña pearl =

Jewelry product derived from the chambered Nautilus

Osmeña pearls are items of jewelry made by polishing the shell of a nautilus found chiefly in the Philippines. It has an iridescent color typically consisting of blue, pink, and purple hues.

Contrary to its name, it is not a true pearl, but rather carved from the inner part of the nautilus shell, and then polished. It is named after former President of the Philippines Sergio Osmeña. Osmeña pearls are used in jewelry such as "earrings, brooches and rings".
