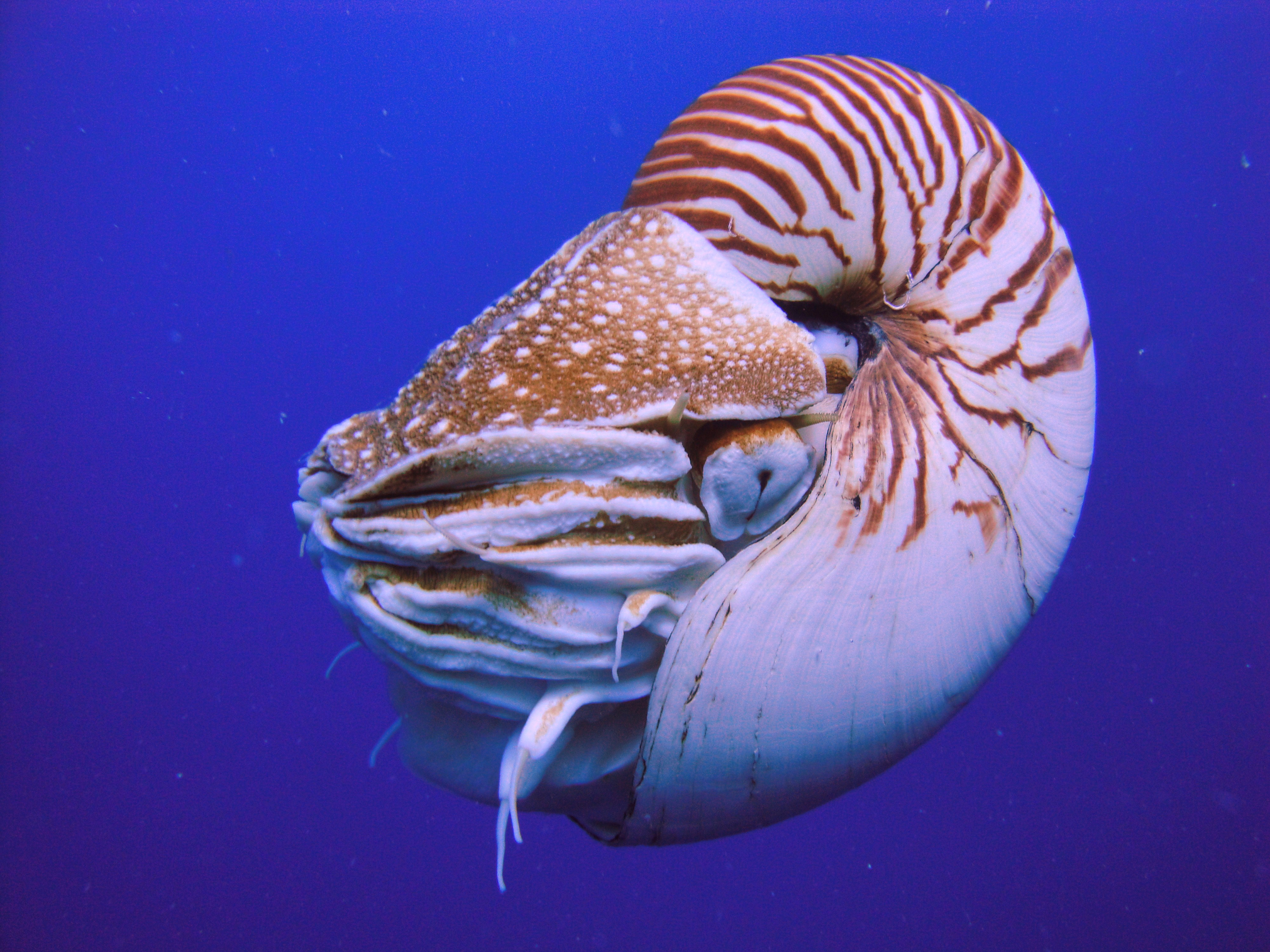
- Nautilus belauensis

Conservation status
- CITES Appendix II

Scientific classification
- Kingdom: Animalia
- Phylum: Mollusca
- Class: Cephalopoda
- Subclass: Nautiloidea
- Order: Nautilida
- Superfamily: Nautilaceae
- Family: Nautilidae; Blainville, 1825

Genera
- †Carinonautilus †Cenoceras †Eutrephoceras †Pseudocenoceras †Strionautilus; Allonautilus; Nautilus († = Extinct)

Synonyms
- Eutrephoceratidae Miller, 1951

= Nautilus =

Nautilus Temporal range: Triassic–present 230–0 Ma

Family of molluscs

A nautilus (from Latin nautilus 'sails like a vessel'; from Ancient Greek ναυτίλος (nautílos) 'seaman, sailor') (Note: The word originally referred to a type of Mediterranean cephalopod mollusc Argonauta argo, also known as 'paper nautilus', which were thought to use their membrane arms as sails. Ancient Greek usage: Aristotle. Callimachus - Epigram V.) is any of the various species within the cephalopod family Nautilidae. This is the sole extant family of the superfamily Nautilaceae, suborder Nautilina, order Nautilida, and subclass Nautiloidea.

It comprises nine living species in two genera, the type of which is the genus Nautilus. Though it more specifically refers to the species Nautilus pompilius, the name chambered nautilus is also used for any of the Nautilidae. All are protected under CITES Appendix II. Depending on species, adult shell diameter is between 10 and 25 cm (4 and 10 inches).

The Nautilidae, both extant and extinct, are characterized by involute or more or less convoluted shells that are generally smooth, with compressed or depressed whorl sections, straight to sinuous sutures, and a tubular, generally central siphuncle. Having survived relatively unchanged for hundreds of millions of years, nautiluses represent the only living members of the subclass Nautiloidea, and are often considered "living fossils".

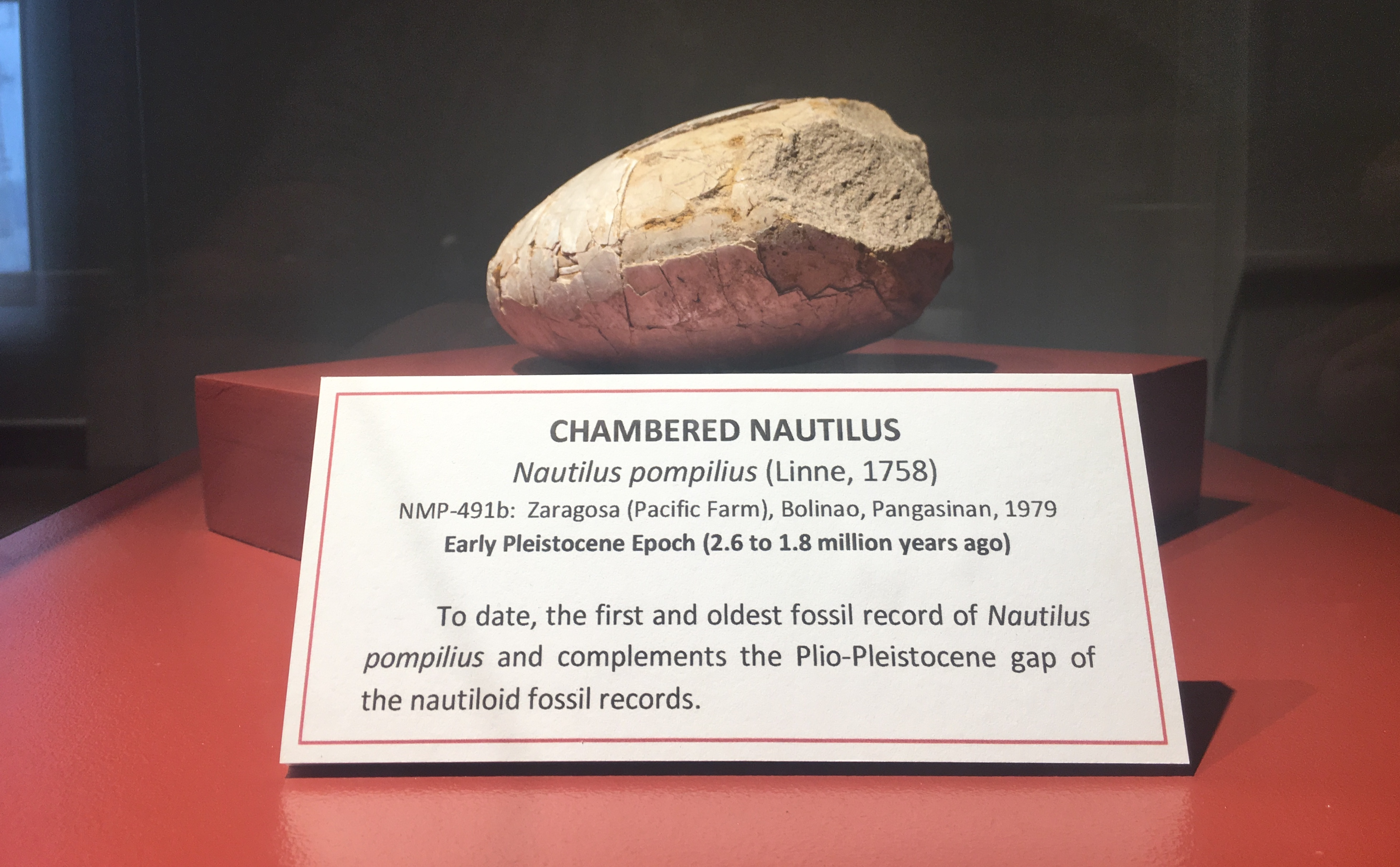
The first and oldest fossil of chambered nautilus displayed at Philippine National Museum.

== Anatomy ==
Diagram of the anatomical structure of a female N. pompilius including most of its internal organs

=== Tentacles ===
The arm crown of modern nautilids (genera Nautilus and Allonautilus) is very distinct in comparison to coleoids. Unlike the ten-armed Decapodiformes or the eight-armed Octopodiformes, nautilus may possess any number of tentacles (cirri) from 50 to over 90 tentacles depending on the sex and individual. These tentacles are classified into three distinct categories: ocular, digital, and labial (buccal). There are two sets of ocular tentacles: one set in front of the eye (pre-ocular) and one set behind the eye (post-ocular). The digital and labial tentacles are arrayed circularly around the mouth, with the digital tentacles forming the outermost ring and the labial tentacles in between the digital tentacles and the mouth. There are 19 pairs of digital tentacles that, together with the ocular tentacles, make up the 42 appendages that are visible when observing the animal (not counting the modified tentacles that form the hood). The labial tentacles are generally not visible, being smaller than the digital tentacles, and more variable both in number and in shape. Males modify four of their labial tentacles into the spadix, which delivers spermatophores into the female during copulation.

The tentacle is composed of two distinct structures: the first structure, a fleshy sheath that contains the second structure: an extendable cirrus (plural: cirri). The sheaths of the digital tentacles are fused at their base into a single mass referred to as the cephalic sheath. The digital cirri can be fully withdrawn into the sheath and are highly flexible, capable of extending just over double their fully retracted length and show a high degree of allowable bendability and torsion. Despite not having suckers, the digital tentacles show strong adhesive capabilities. Adhesion is achieved through the secretion of a neutral (rather than acidic) mucopolysaccharide from secretory cells in the ridges of the digital cirri. Release is triggered through contraction of the tentacle musculature rather than the secretion of a chemical solvent, similar to the adhesion/release system in Euprymna, though it is unclear whether these adhesives are homologous. The ocular tentacles show no adhesive capability but operate as sensory organs. Both the ocular tentacles and the eight lateral digital tentacles show chemoreceptive abilities; the preocular tentacles detect distant odor and the lateral digital tentacles detect nearby odor.

=== Digestive system ===
The radula is wide and distinctively has nine teeth.

The mouth consists of a parrot-like beak made up of two interlocking jaws capable of ripping the animal's food — mostly crustaceans — from the rocks to which they are attached. Males can be superficially differentiated from females by examining the arrangement of tentacles around the buccal cone: males have a spadix organ (shaped like a spike or shovel) located on the left side of the cone making the cone look irregular, whereas the buccal cone of the female is bilaterally symmetrical.

The crop is the largest portion of the digestive tract, and is highly extensible. From the crop, food passes to the small muscular stomach for crushing, and then goes past a digestive caecum before entering the relatively brief intestine.

=== Circulatory system ===
Like all cephalopods, the blood of the nautilus contains hemocyanin, which is blue in its oxygenated state. There are two pairs of gills which are the only remnants of the ancestral metamerism to be visible in extant cephalopods. Oxygenated blood arrives at the heart through four ventricles and flows out to the animal's organs through distinct aortas but returns through veins which are too small and varied to be specifically described. The one exception to this is the vena cava, a single large vein running along the underside of the crop into which nearly all other vessels containing deoxygenated blood empty. All blood passes through one of the four sets of filtering organs (composed of one pericardial appendage and two renal appendages) upon leaving the vena cava and before arriving at the gills for re-oxygenation. Blood waste is emptied through a series of corresponding pores into the pallial cavity.

=== Nervous system ===
The central component of the nautilus nervous system is the oesophageal nerve ring which is a collection of ganglia, commissures, and connectives that together form a ring around the animal's oesophagus. From this ring extend all of the nerves forward to the mouth, tentacles, and funnel; laterally to the eyes and rhinophores; and posteriorly to the remaining organs.

The nerve ring does not constitute what is typically considered a cephalopod "brain": the upper portion of the nerve ring lacks differentiated lobes, and most of the nervous tissue appears to focus on finding and consuming food (i.e., it lacks a "higher learning" center). Nautili also tend to have rather short memory spans, and the nerve ring is not protected by any form of brain case.

=== Shell ===
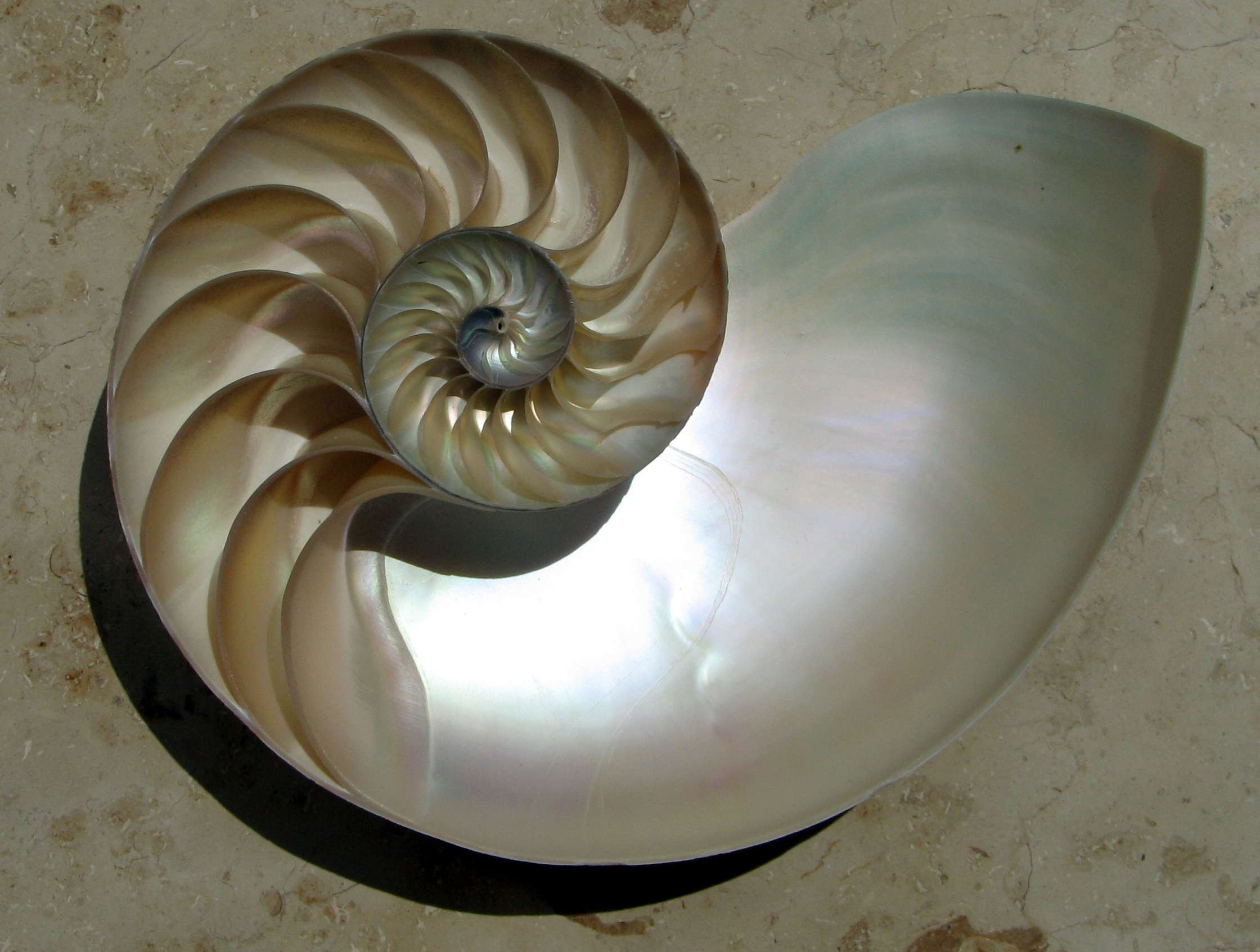
Nautilus half-shell showing the camerae in a logarithmic spiral

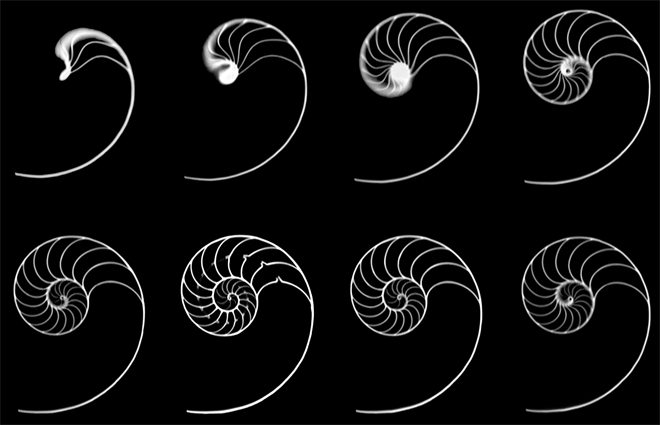
Section cut of a nautilus shell

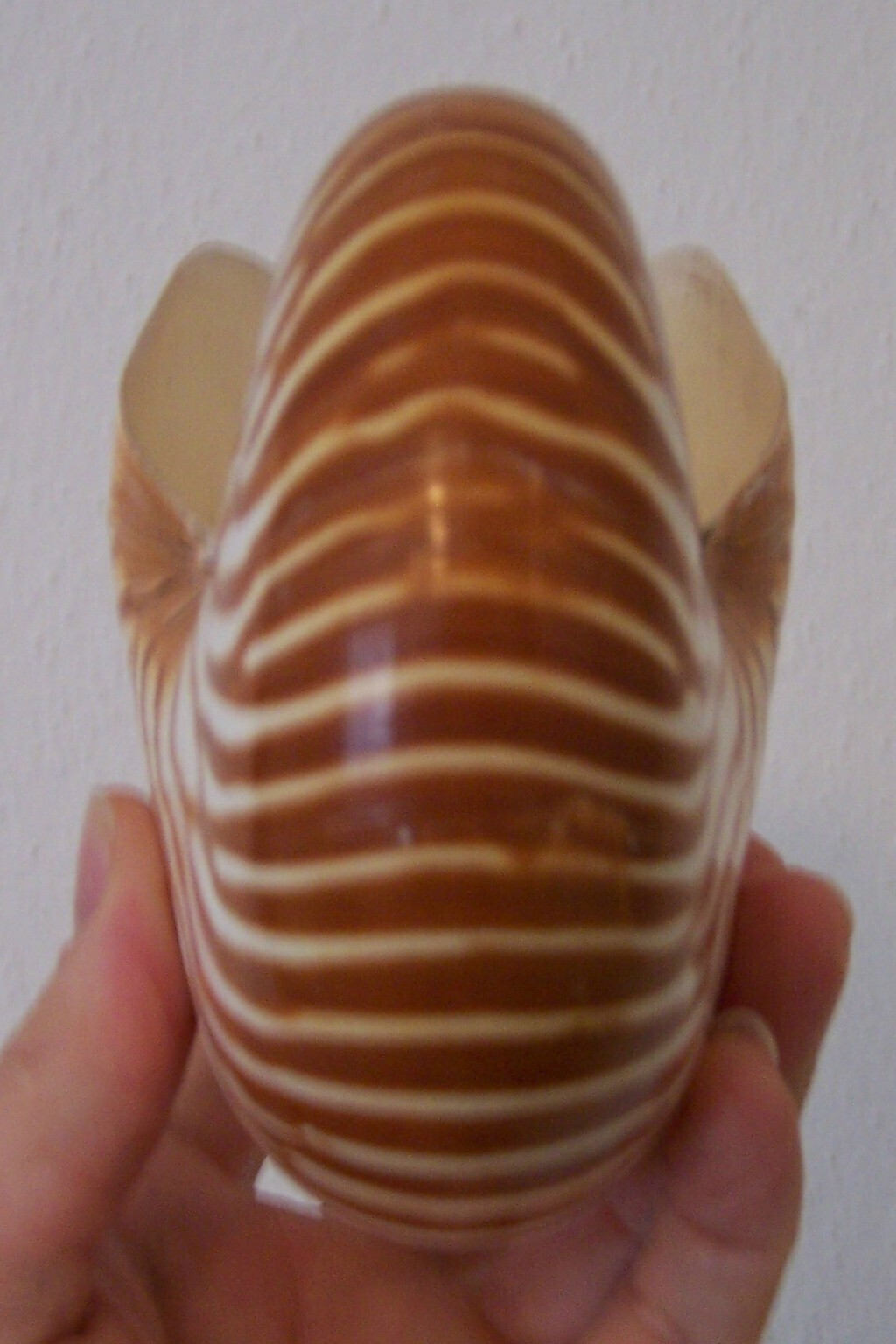
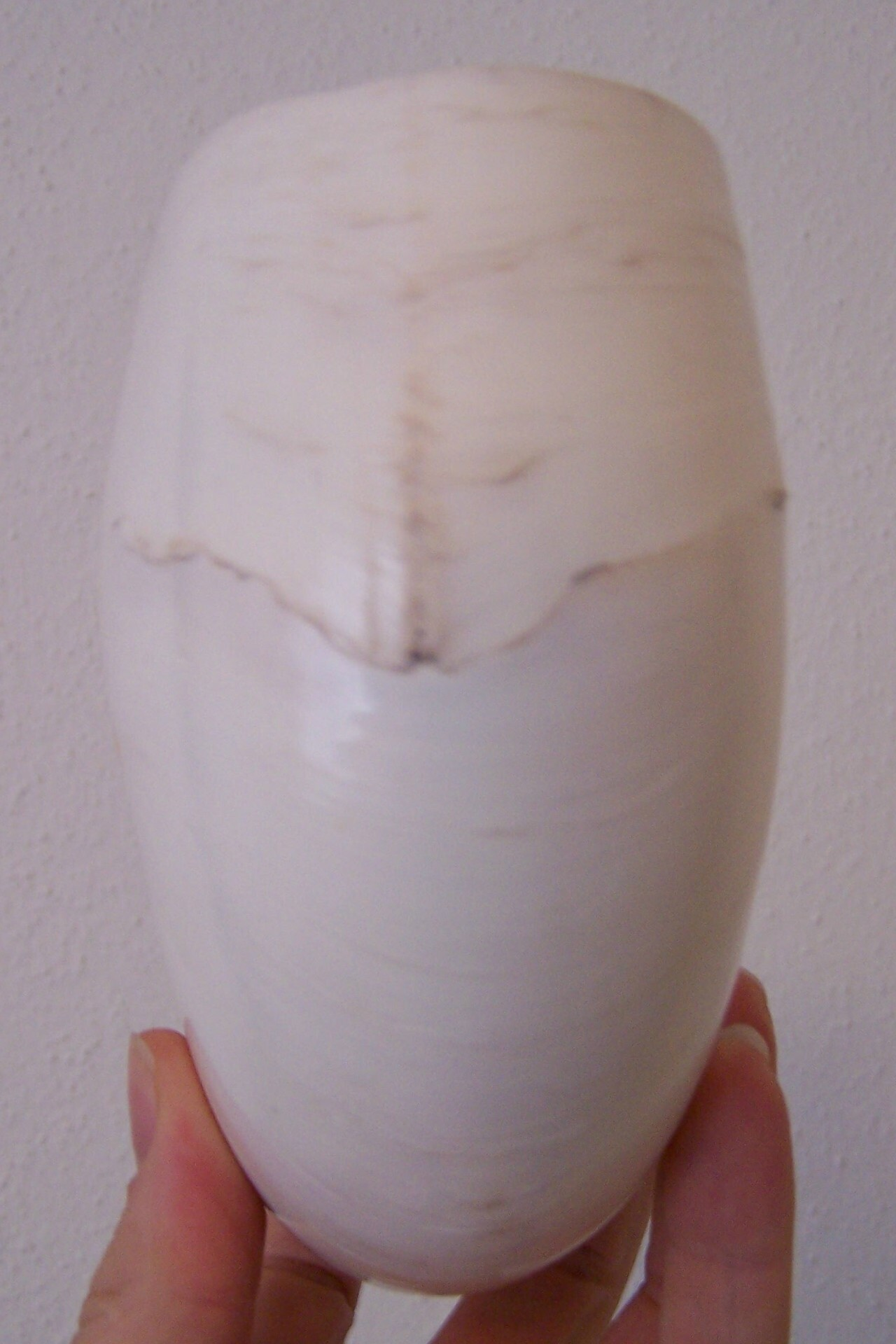
A nautilus shell viewed from above (left), and from underneath (right)

Nautili are the sole living cephalopods whose bony body structure is externalized as a planispiral shell. The animal can withdraw completely into its shell and close the opening with a leathery hood formed from two specially folded tentacles. The shell is coiled, aragonitic, nacreous and pressure-resistant, thought to be imploding at a depth of about 800 m (2,600 ft). The nautilus shell is composed of two layers: a matte white outer layer with dark orange stripes, and a striking white iridescent inner layer. The innermost portion of the shell is a pearlescent blue-gray. The osmeña pearl, contrarily to its name, is not a pearl, but a jewellery product derived from this part of the shell.

Internally, the shell divides into camerae (chambers), the chambered section being called the phragmocone. The divisions are defined by septa, each of which is pierced in the middle by a duct, the siphuncle. As the nautilus matures, it creates new, larger camerae and moves its growing body into the larger space, sealing the vacated chamber with a new septum. The camerae increase in number from around 4 at the moment of hatching to 30 or more in adults.

The shell coloration also keeps the animal cryptic in the water. When seen from above, the shell is darker in color and marked with irregular stripes, which helps it blend into the dark water below. The underside is almost completely white, making the animal indistinguishable from brighter waters near the surface. This mode of camouflage is called countershading.

The nautilus shell presents one of the finest natural examples of a logarithmic spiral, although it is not a golden spiral. The use of nautilus shells in art and literature is covered at nautilus shell.

=== Size ===
N. pompilius is the largest species in the genus. One form from Indonesia and northern Australia, once called N. repertus, may reach 25.4 cm (10.0 in) in diameter. However, most nautilus species never exceed 20 cm (8 in). Nautilus macromphalus is the smallest species, usually measuring only up to 16 cm (6 1/2 in). A dwarf population from the Sulu Sea (Nautilus pompilius suluensis) is even smaller, with a mean shell diameter of 11.56 cm (4.55 in).

== Physiology ==
=== Buoyancy and movement ===
Nautilus locomotion

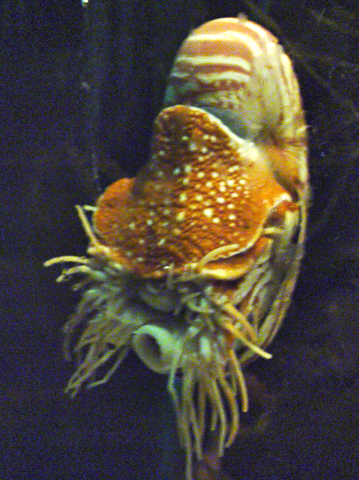
Nautilus with extended tentacles and hyponome visible

To swim, the nautilus draws water into and out of the living chamber with its hyponome, which uses jet propulsion. This mode of propulsion is generally considered inefficient compared to propulsion with fins or undulatory locomotion, however, the nautilus has been found to be particularly efficient compared to other jet-propelled marine animals like squid and jellyfish. It is thought that this is related to the use of asymmetrical contractile cycles and may be an adaptation to mitigate metabolic demands and protect against hypoxia when foraging at depth. While water is inside the chamber, the siphuncle extracts salt from it and diffuses it into the blood.

The animal adjusts its buoyancy only in long term density changes by osmosis, either removing liquid from its chambers or allowing water from the blood in the siphuncle to slowly refill the chambers. This is done in response to sudden changes in buoyancy that can occur with predatory attacks of fish, which can break off parts of the shell. This limits nautiluses in that they cannot operate under the extreme hydrostatic pressures found at depths greater than approximately 800 metres (2,600 ft), and in fact implode at about that depth, causing instant death. The gas also contained in the chambers is slightly below atmospheric pressure at sea level. The maximum depth at which they can regulate buoyancy by osmotic removal of chamber liquid is not known.

The nautilus has the extremely rare ability to withstand being brought to the surface from its deep natural habitat without suffering any apparent damage from the experience. Whereas fish or crustaceans brought up from such depths inevitably arrive dead, a nautilus will be unfazed despite the pressure change of as much as 80 standard atmospheres (1,200 psi). The exact reasons for this ability, which is thought to be coincidental rather than specifically functional, are not known, though the perforated structure of the animal's vena cava is thought to play an important role.

=== Senses ===
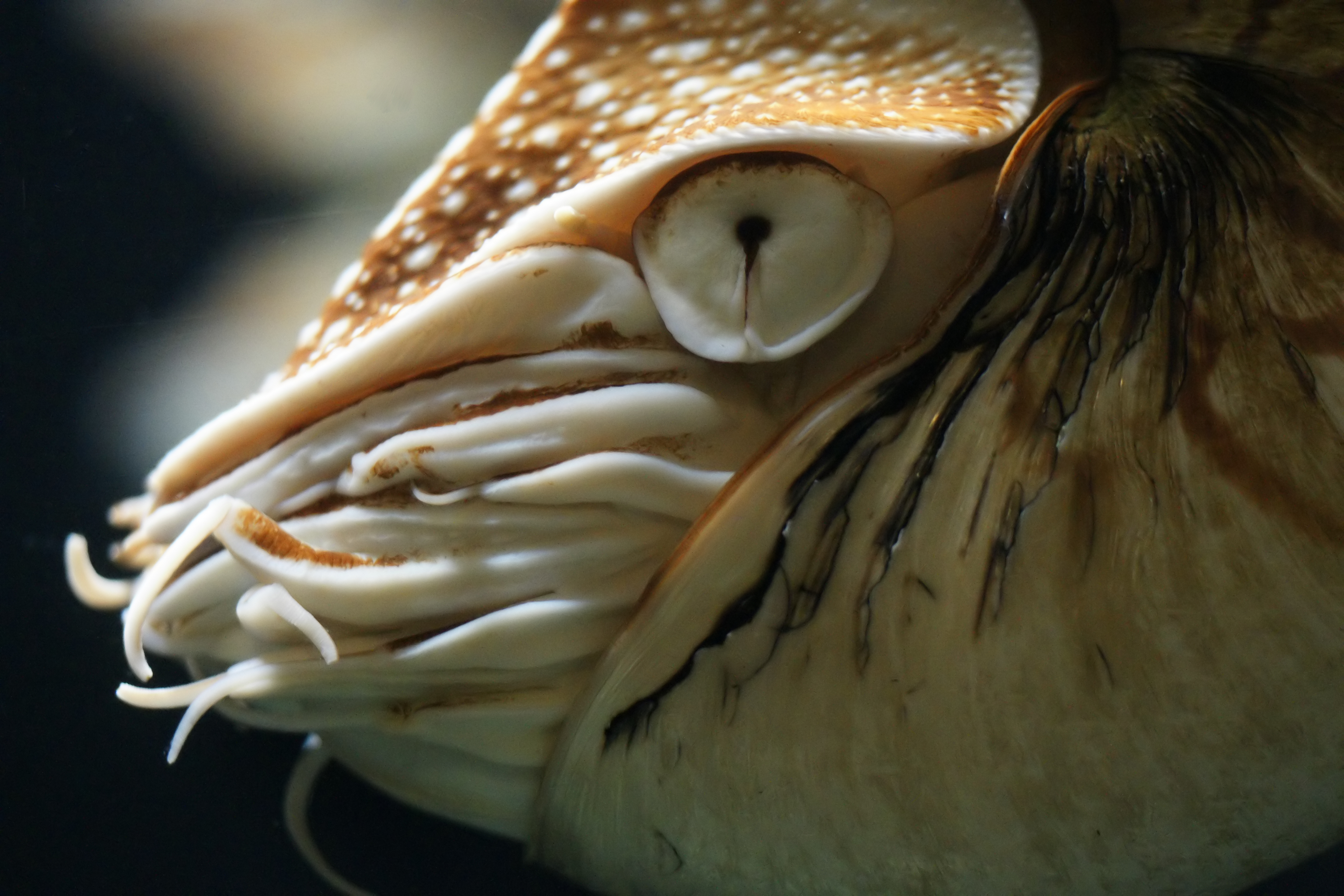
Head of N. pompilius showing the rudimentary eye, which functions similarly to a pinhole camera

Unlike many other cephalopods, nautiluses do not have what many consider to be good vision; their eye structure is highly developed but lacks a solid lens. Whereas a sealed lens allows for the formation of highly focused and clear, detailed surrounding imagery, nautiluses have a simple pinhole eye open to the environment which only allows for the creation of correspondingly simple imagery.

Instead of vision, the animal is thought to use olfaction (smell) as the primary sense for foraging and for locating and identifying potential mates.

The "ear" of the nautilus consists of structures called otocysts located immediately behind the pedal ganglia near the nerve ring. They are oval structures densely packed with elliptical calcium carbonate crystals.

=== Brain and intelligence ===
Nautiluses are much closer to the first cephalopods that appeared about 500 million years ago than the early modern cephalopods that appeared maybe 100 million years later (ammonoids and coleoids). They have a seemingly simple brain, not the large complex brains of octopus, cuttlefish and squid, and had long been assumed to lack intelligence. But the cephalopod nervous system is quite different from that of other animals, and recent experiments have shown not only memory, but a changing response to the same event over time.

In a study in 2008, a group of nautiluses (N. pompilius) were given food as a bright blue light flashed until they began to associate the light with food, extending their tentacles every time the blue light was flashed. The blue light was again flashed without the food 3 minutes, 30 minutes, 1 hour, 6 hours, 12 hours, and 24 hours later. The nautiluses continued to respond excitedly to the blue light for up to 30 minutes after the experiment. An hour later they showed no reaction to the blue light. However, between 6 and 12 hours after the training, they again responded to the blue light, but more tentatively. The researchers concluded that nautiluses had memory capabilities similar to the "short-term" and "long-term memories" of the more advanced cephalopods, despite having different brain structures. However, the long-term memory capability of nautiluses was much shorter than that of other cephalopods. The nautiluses completely forgot the earlier training 24 hours later, in contrast to octopuses, for example, which can remember conditioning for weeks afterwards. However, this may be simply the result of the conditioning procedure being suboptimal for sustaining long-term memories in nautiluses. Nevertheless, the study showed that scientists had previously underestimated the memory capabilities of nautiluses.

=== Reproduction and lifespan ===
Nautiluses reproduce by laying eggs. Gravid females attach the fertilized eggs, either singly or in small batches, to rocks in warmer waters (21–25 Celsius), whereupon the eggs take eight to twelve months to develop until the 30-millimetre (1.2 in) juveniles hatch. Females spawn once per year and regenerate their gonads, making nautiluses the only cephalopods to present iteroparity or polycyclic spawning.

Nautiluses are sexually dimorphic, in that males have four cirri modified into an organ, called the "spadix", which transfers sperm into the female's mantle during mating. At sexual maturity, the male shell becomes slightly larger than the female's. Males have been found to greatly outnumber females in practically all published studies, accounting for 60 to 94% of all recorded individuals at different sites.

The lifespan of nautiluses may exceed 20 years, which is exceptionally lengthy for a cephalopod, many of whom live less than three even in captivity and under ideal living conditions. However, nautiluses typically do not reach sexual maturity until they are about 15 years old, limiting their reproductive lifespan to often less than five years.

Nautiluses have several reproductive organs whose functions are not yet entirely known. In nautilus males, this is the Van der Hoeven's organ; and in nautilus females, these are the Organ of Valenciennes and Owen's laminated organ.

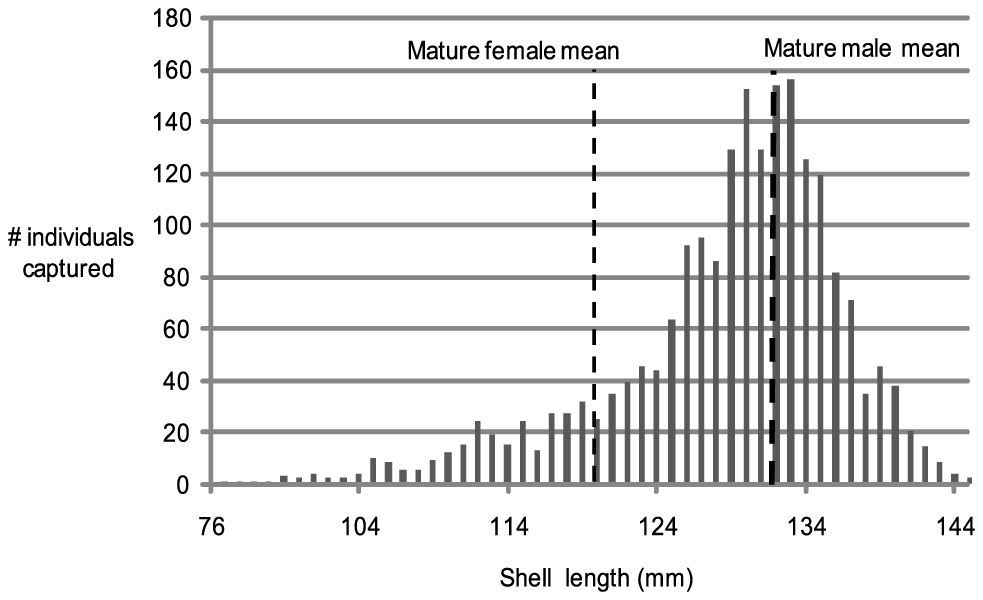
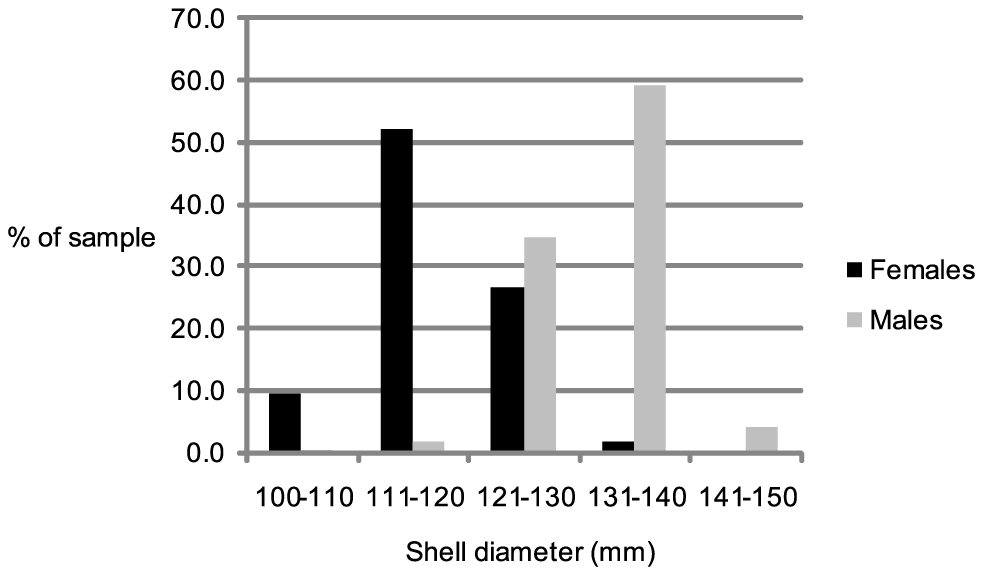
Left: Frequency distribution of N. pompilius shell diameter at Osprey Reef, part of the Coral Sea Islands, based on 2067 captured individuals. Shells ranged in size from 76 to 145 mm, with a mean of 128.6±28.01 mm.
Right: Shell diameter of mature male and female N. pompilius caught at Osprey Reef. Males (n = 870) had a mean shell diameter of 131.9±2.6 mm, compared to 118.9±7.5 mm in females (n = 86). The Osprey Reef N. pompilius population is the second smallest known in terms of mean shell diameter, after the dwarf form from the Sulu Sea (130.7 mm and 115.6 mm, respectively).

== Ecology ==
=== Range and habitat ===
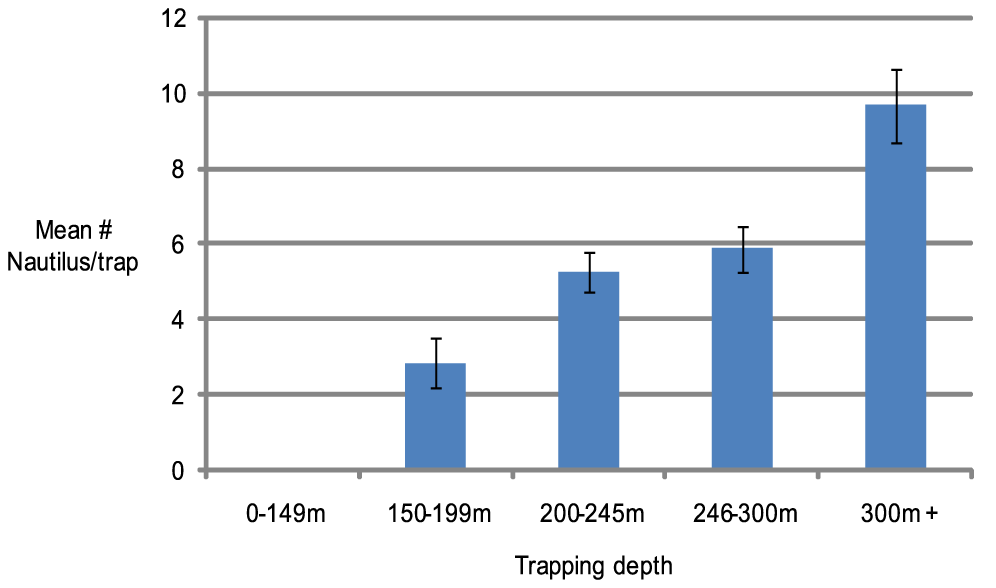
Number of captured N. pompilius at various depths around the Osprey Reef Seamount, Coral Sea. The data was collated from 271 trapping events spread across all months of the year. Nautiluses were most common at 300–350 m (1,000–1,100 ft). No specimens were recovered from a depth of less than 150 m (500 ft) during 18 trapping efforts.

Nautiluses are found only in the Indo-Pacific, from 30° N to 30° S latitude and 90° E to 175° E longitude. They inhabit the deep slopes of coral reefs.

Nautiluses usually inhabit depths of several hundred metres. It has long been believed that nautiluses rise at night to feed, mate, and lay eggs, but it appears that, in at least some populations, the vertical movement patterns of these animals are far more complex. The greatest depth at which a nautilus has been sighted is 703 m (2,306 ft) (N. pompilius). Implosion depth for nautilus shells is thought to be around 800 m (2,600 ft). Only in New Caledonia, the Loyalty Islands, and Vanuatu can nautiluses be observed in very shallow water, at depths of as little as 5 m (15 ft). This is due to the cooler surface waters found in these southern hemisphere habitats as compared to the many equatorial habitats of other nautilus populations – these usually being restricted to depths greater than 100 m (300 ft). Nautiluses generally avoid water temperatures above 25 °C (75 °F).

While nautiloids were once common worldwide, their numbers declined and their distribution became restricted to their current habitats during the Pleistocene, largely due to the diversification of pinnipeds.

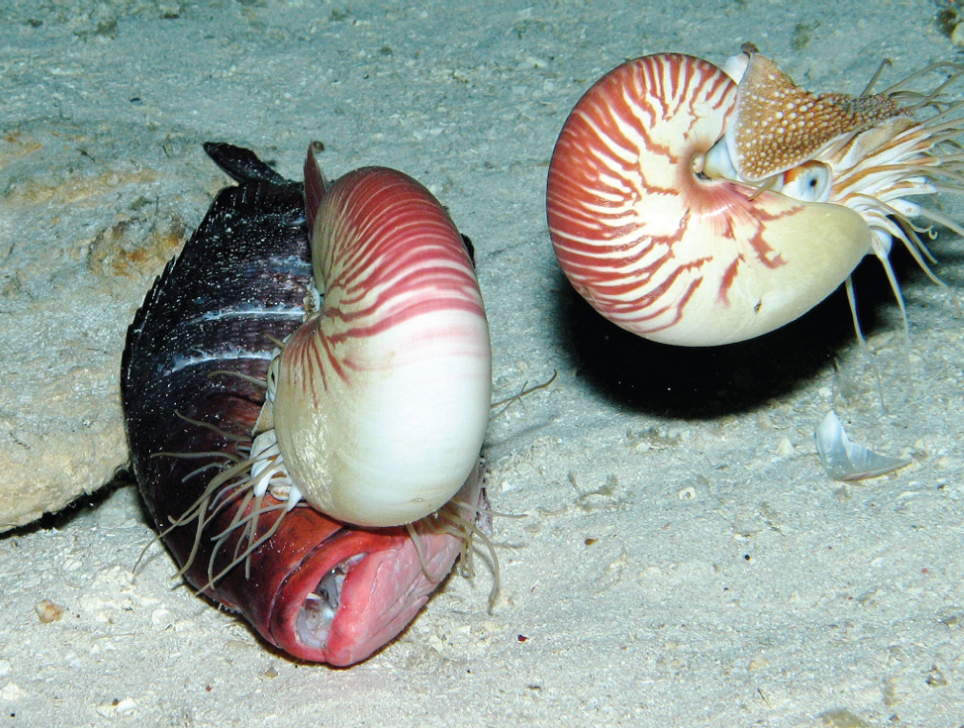
A pair of N. pompilius feeding on two-spot red snapper (Lutjanus bohar) bait during daytime at 703 m (2,306 ft) depth. This observation constitutes the deepest record of any nautilus species.

=== Diet ===
Nautiluses are scavengers and opportunistic predators. They eat lobster molts, hermit crabs, and carrion of any kind.

== Evolutionary history ==
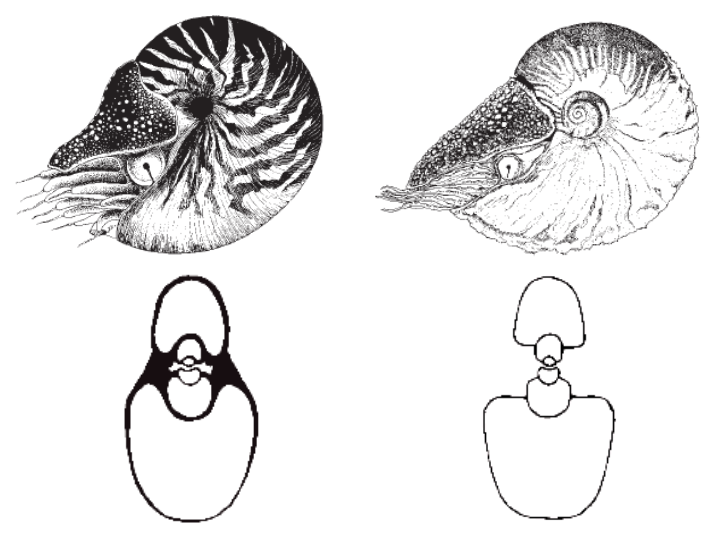
Shell characters of the genera Nautilus and Allonautilus

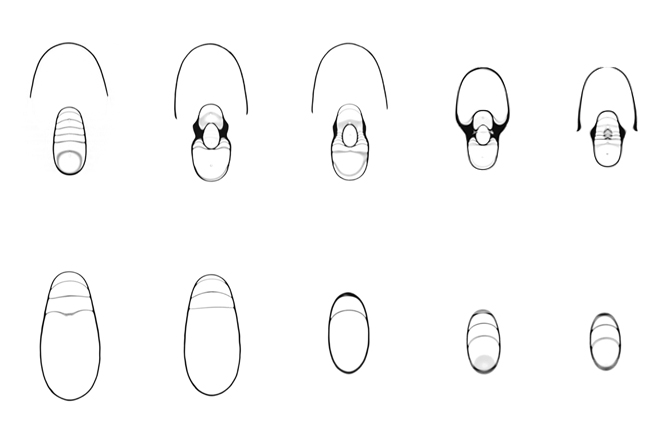
Section cut of a nautilus shell

Fossil records indicate that nautiloids have experienced minimal morphological changes over the past 500 million years. Many were initially straight-shelled, as in the extinct genus Lituites. They developed in the Late Cambrian period and became a significant group of sea predators during the Ordovician period. Certain species reached over 2.5 m (8 ft) in size. The other extant cephalopod subclass, Coleoidea, diverged from the nautiloids long ago and the nautilus has remained relatively unchanged since. Nautiloids were much more extensive and varied 200 million years ago. The ancestors of all Coleoidea (shell-less cephalopods) once possessed shells, and many early cephalopod species are only known from shell remains. Following the K-Pg extinction event, most nautiloid species went extinct with only three surviving families, while members of Coleoidea managed to survive.

The family Nautilidae has its origin in the Trigonocerataceae (Centroceratina), specifically in the Syringonautilidae of the Late Triassic and continues to this day with Nautilus, the type genus, and its close relative, Allonautilus.

=== Fossil genera ===
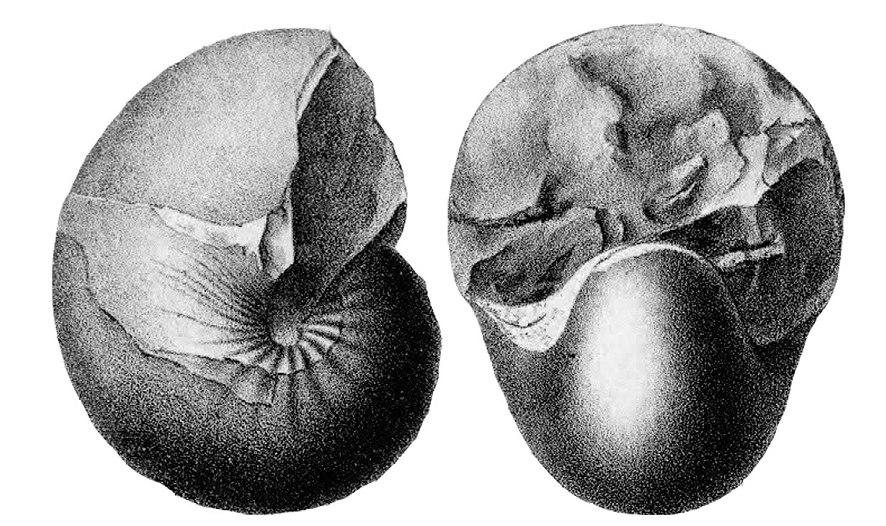
Eutrephoceras dorbignyanum

The fossil record of Nautilidae begins with Cenoceras in the Late Triassic, a highly varied genus that makes up the Jurassic Cenoceras complex. Cenoceras is evolute to involute, and globular to lentincular; with a suture that generally has a shallow ventral and lateral lobe and a siphuncle that is variable in position but never extremely ventral or dorsal. Cenoceras is not found above the Middle Jurassic and is followed by the Upper Jurassic-Miocene Eutrephoceras.

Eutrephoceras is generally subglobular, broadly rounded laterally and ventrally, with a small to occluded umbilicus, broadly rounded hyponomic sinus, only slightly sinuous sutures, and a small siphuncle that is variable in position.

Next to appear is the Lower Cretaceous Strionautilus from India and the European ex-USSR, named by Shimanskiy in 1951. Strionautilus is compressed, involute, with fine longitudinal striations. Whorl sections are subrectangular, sutures sinuous, the siphuncle subcentral.

Also from the Cretaceous is Pseudocenoceras, named by Spath in 1927. Pseudocenoceras is compressed, smooth, with subrectangular whorl sections, flattened venter, and a deep umbilicus. The suture crosses the venter essentially straight and has a broad, shallow, lateral lobe. The siphuncle is small and subcentral. Pseudocenoceras is found in the Crimea and in Libya.

Carinonautilus is a genus from the Upper Cretaceous of India, named by Spengler in 1919. Carinonautilus is a very involute form with high whorl section and flanks that converge on a narrow venter that bears a prominent rounded keel. The umbilicus is small and shallow, the suture only slightly sinuous. The siphuncle is unknown.

Obinautilus has also been placed in Nautilidae by some authorities, though it may instead be an argonautid octopus.

== Taxonomy ==
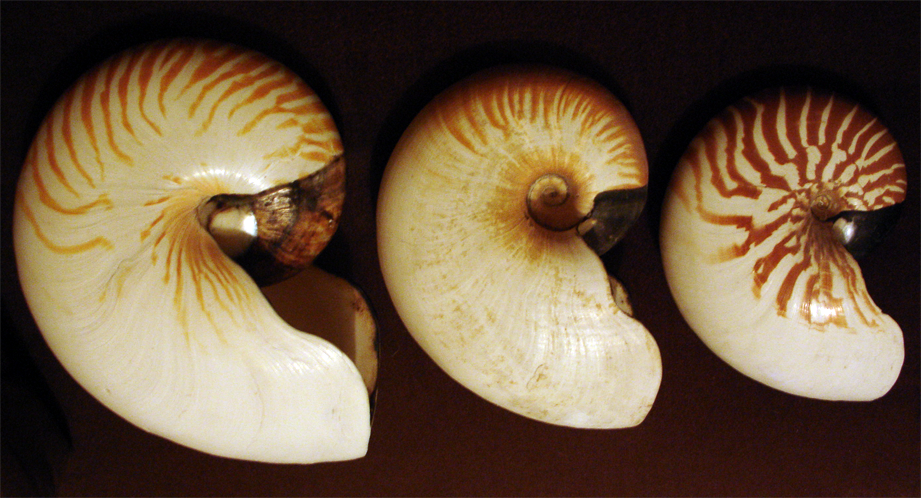
Nautilus shells: Left: Nautilus pompilius; center: Allonautilus scrobiculatus; right: Nautilus macromphalus.

The family Nautilidae contains up to nine extant species and several extinct species:

- Genus Allonautilus
  - A. perforatus
  - A. scrobiculatus
- Genus Nautilus
  - †N. altifrons
  - †N. balcombensis
  - N. belauensis
  - †N. butonensis
  - †N. campbelli
  - †N. cookanus
  - †N. geelongensis
  - †N. javanus
  - N. macromphalus
  - N. pompilius (type)
    - N. p. pompilius
    - N. p. suluensis
  - †N. praepompilius
  - N. samoaensis Barord et al., 2023 – Samoa
  - N. stenomphalus
  - †N. taiwanus Huang, 2002– Taiwan
  - N. vanuatuensis Barord et al., 2023 – Vanuatu
  - N. vitiensis Barord et al., 2023 – Fiji

Genetic data collected in 2011 pointed to there being only three extant species: A. scrobiculatus, N. macromphalus, and N. pompilius, with N. belauensis and N. stenomphalus both subsumed under N. pompilius, possibly as subspecies, though this was prior to the description of three additional species (N. samoaensis, N. vanuatuensis and N. vitiensis).

=== Dubious or uncertain taxa ===
The following taxa associated with the family Nautilidae are of uncertain taxonomic status:

Binomial name and author citation	Current systematic status	Type locality	Type repository
N. alumnus Iredale, 1944	Species dubium [fide Saunders (1987:49)]	Queensland, Australia	Not designated [fide Saunders (1987:49)]
N. ambiguus Sowerby, 1848	Species dubium [fide Saunders (1987:48)]	Not designated	Unresolved
N. beccarii Linné, 1758	Non-cephalopod; Foraminifera [fide Frizzell and Keen (1949:106)]		
N. calcar Linné, 1758	?Non-cephalopod; Foraminifera Lenticulina	Adriatic Sea	Unresolved; Linnean Society of London?
N. crispus Linné, 1758	Undetermined	Mediterranean Sea	Unresolved; Linnean Society of London?
N. crista Linné, 1758	Non-cephalopod; Turbo [fide Dodge (1953:14)]		
N. fascia Linné, 1758	Undetermined	Adriatic Sea	Unresolved; Linnean Society of London?
N. granum Linné, 1758	Undetermined	Mediterranean Sea	Unresolved; Linnean Society of London?
N. lacustris Lightfoot, 1786	Non-cephalopod; Helix [fide Dillwyn (1817:339)]		
N. legumen Linné, 1758	Undetermined	Adriatic Sea	Unresolved; Linnean Society of London?
N. micrombilicatus Joubin, 1888	Nomen nudum		
N. obliquus Linné, 1758	Undetermined	Adriatic Sea	Unresolved; Linnean Society of London?
N. pompilius marginalis Willey, 1896	Species dubium [fide Saunders (1987:50)]	New Guinea	Unresolved
N. pompilius moretoni Willey, 1896	Species dubium [fide Saunders (1987:49)]	New Guinea	Unresolved
N. pompilius perforatus Willey, 1896	Species dubium [fide Saunders (1987:49)]	New Guinea	Unresolved
N. radicula Linné, 1758	?Non-cephalopod; F. Nodosaria	Adriatic Sea	Unresolved; Linnean Society of London?
N. raphanistrum Linné, 1758	Undetermined	Mediterranean Sea	Unresolved; Linnean Society of London?
N. raphanus Linné, 1758	Undetermined	Adriatic Sea	Unresolved; Linnean Society of London?
N. semi-lituus Linné, 1758	Undetermined	Liburni, Adriatic Sea	Unresolved; Linnean Society of London?
N. sipunculus Linné, 1758	Undetermined	"freto Siculo"	Unresolved; Linnean Society of London?
N. texturatus Gould, 1857	Nomen nudum		
Octopodia nautilus Schneider, 1784	Rejected specific name [fide Opinion 233, ICZN (1954:278)]		

== Conservation status and human use ==
Nautilus are collected or fished for sale as live animals or to carve the shells for souvenirs and collectibles, not for just the shape of their shells, but also the nacreous inner shell layer, which is used as a pearl substitute. In Samoa, nautilus shells decorate the forehead band of a traditional headdress called tuiga. Nautilus shells were popular items in the Renaissance and Baroque cabinet of curiosities and were often mounted by goldsmiths on a thin stem to make extravagant nautilus shell cups.

The low fecundity, late maturity, long gestation period and long life-span of nautiluses suggest that these species are vulnerable to overexploitation and demand for the ornamental shell is causing population declines. The threats from trade in these shells has led to countries such as Indonesia legally protecting the chambered nautilus with fines of up to US$8,500 and/or 5 years in prison for trading in this species. Despite their legal protection, these shells were reported to be openly sold at tourist areas in Bali as of 2014. The continued trade of these animals has led to a call for increased protection and in 2016 all species in the family Nautilidae were added to CITES Appendix II, regulating international trade.

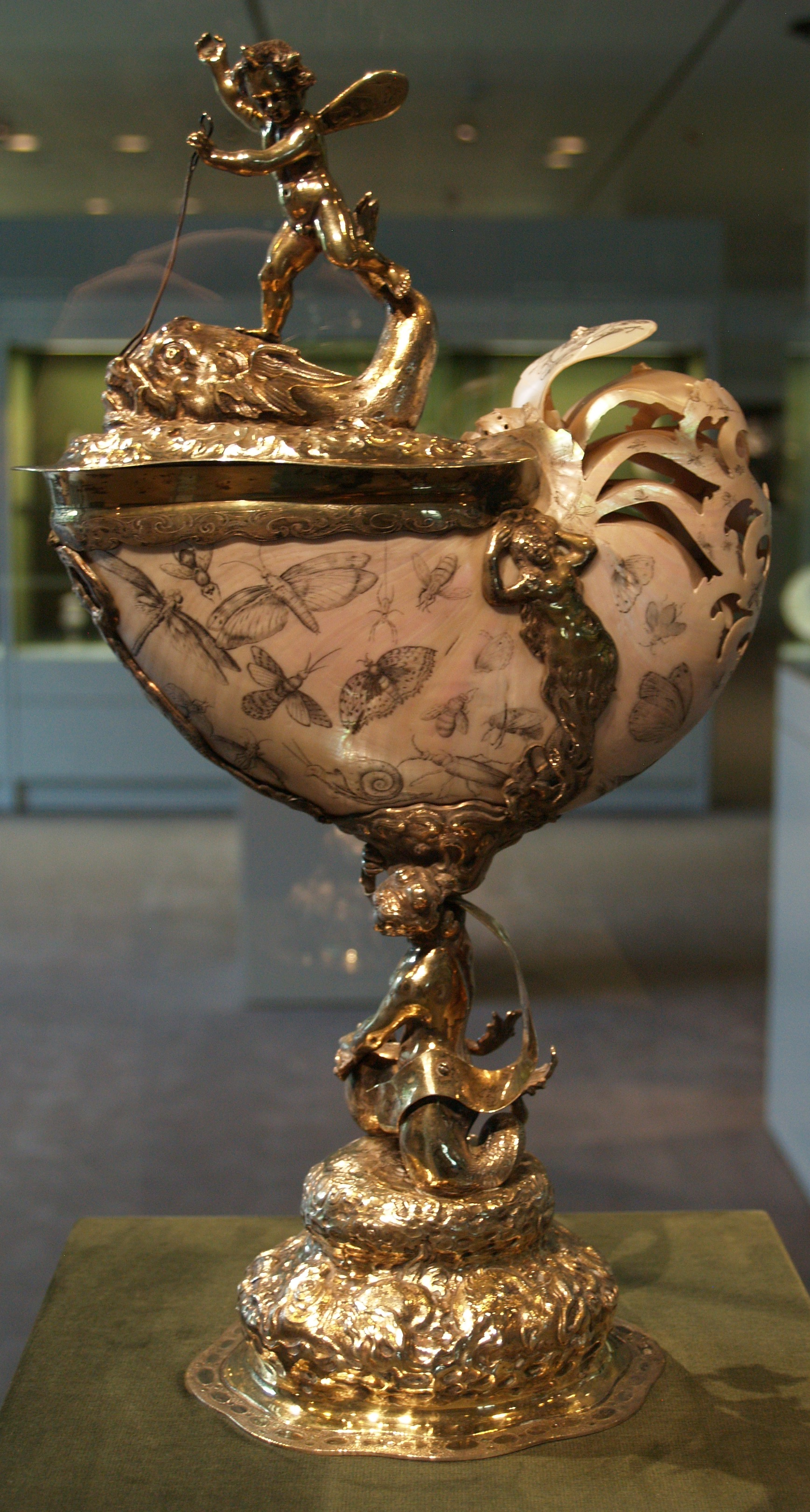
Baroque nautilus cup of Aleksander Kęsowski, abbot of Oliwa, 1643–1667

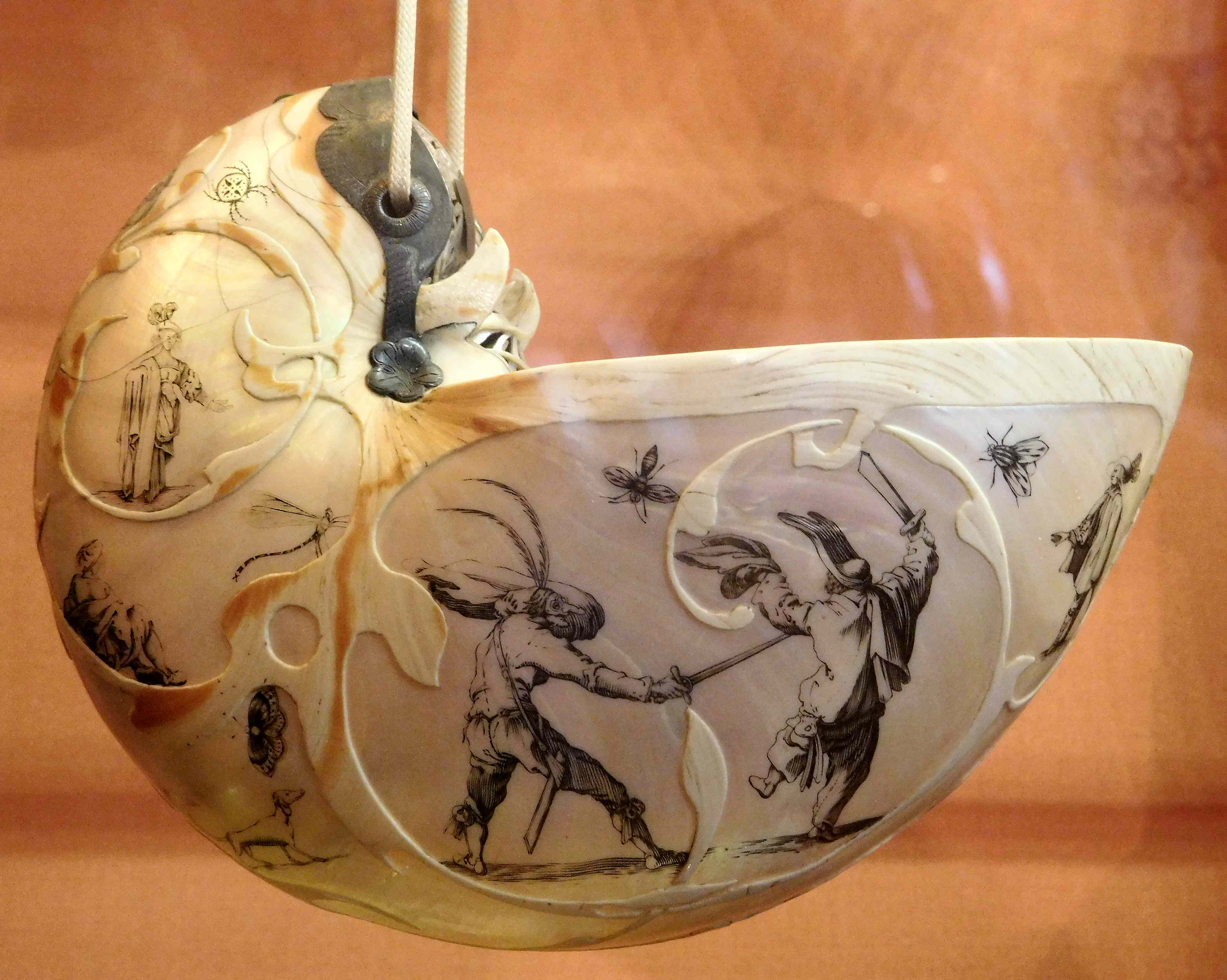
Nautilus shell carved and painted with fanciful scenes of human figures and animals (spider, dragonfly, dog, butterfly, sawfly, fly), bronze pendant mount, nineteenth century. Poldi Pezzoli Museum, Milan

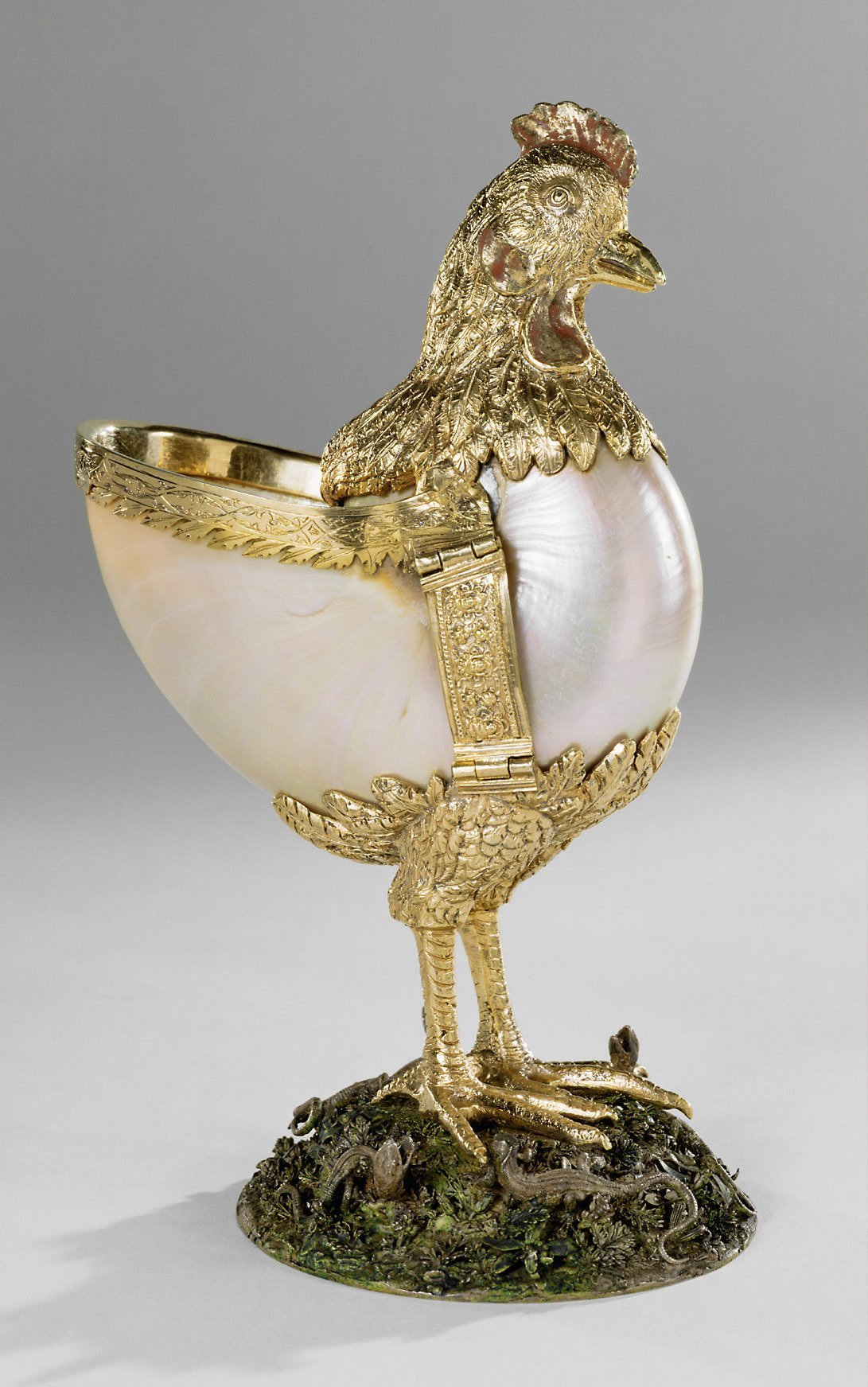
A nautilus shell in the form of a chicken, circa 1550

== In human culture ==
Palauans see nautiluses (Palauan: kedarm) as a symbol of vulnerable or fragile character from a belief that they easily die even from slight bumps on ocean rocks; hence someone who gets quickly angry after being pranked is compared to one (ng ko er a kedarm, el di metirem e metord).

== See also ==
- Cephalopod size, for maximum shell diameters
- Historia animalium by Conrad Gessner, first book with fossil illustrations
- The Nautilus, a malacological journal
- The Chambered Nautilus, a poem of Oliver Wendell Holmes
- Nautilus Pompilius, a Russian rock band
- Nautilus (fictional submarine) from Jules Verne's classic 1870 science-fiction novel Twenty Thousand Leagues Under the Seas, describing the voyage of Captain Nemo's Nautilus submarine.
