= Owen's laminated organ =

Internal organ of the female of the genus Nautilus

Owen's laminated organ, named after the 19th century English biologist Richard Owen, is one of two secondary sexual organs of the female of the genus Nautilus. The other is the organ of Valenciennes. Its exact function is unknown.
