= Organ of Valenciennes =

The organ of Valenciennes, named after the French naturalist Achille Valenciennes, is one of two secondary sexual organs of the female of the genus Nautilus. The other is Owen's laminated organ. Its exact function is unknown.
