= Spadix (zoology) =

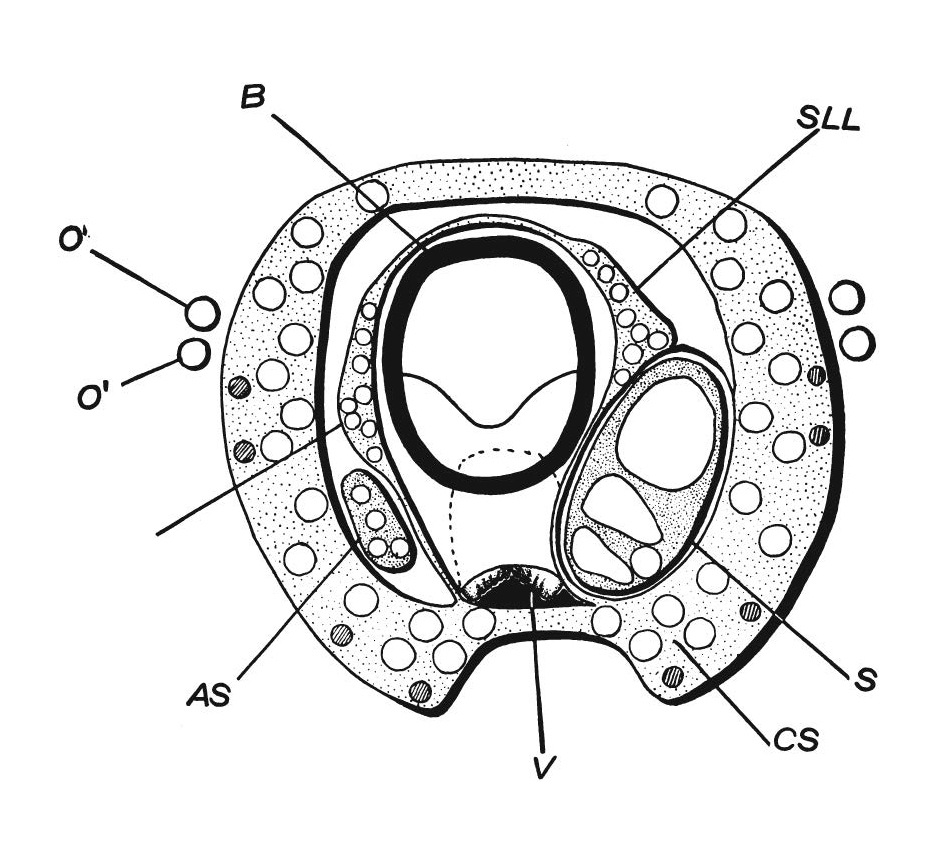
Diagram of the mouth of an adult male Nautilus pompilius. AS, antispadix; B, buccal mass; CS, cephalic sheath composed of the fused sheaths of the digital tentacles; O', preocular tentacle; O'', postocular tentacle; S, spadlx; SLL, superior labial lobe; V, Van der Hoeven's organ.

In the field of zoology, a spadix (pl.: spadices) is a secondary sexual organ found in some cephalopods and hydrozoans. In the genus Nautilus, the spadix is a composite erectile organ in the male located in the oral region which is composed of four highly modified tentacles and which is paired with a somewhat smaller antispadix that is also composed of four tentacles. The spadix is normally a concealed organ but quickly becomes distended upon the animal's death. The exact function of the spadix and antispadix in Nautilus is not yet known.

== See also ==
- Spadix (botany)
