= Periostracum =

Outermost layer of the shell in many shelled animals

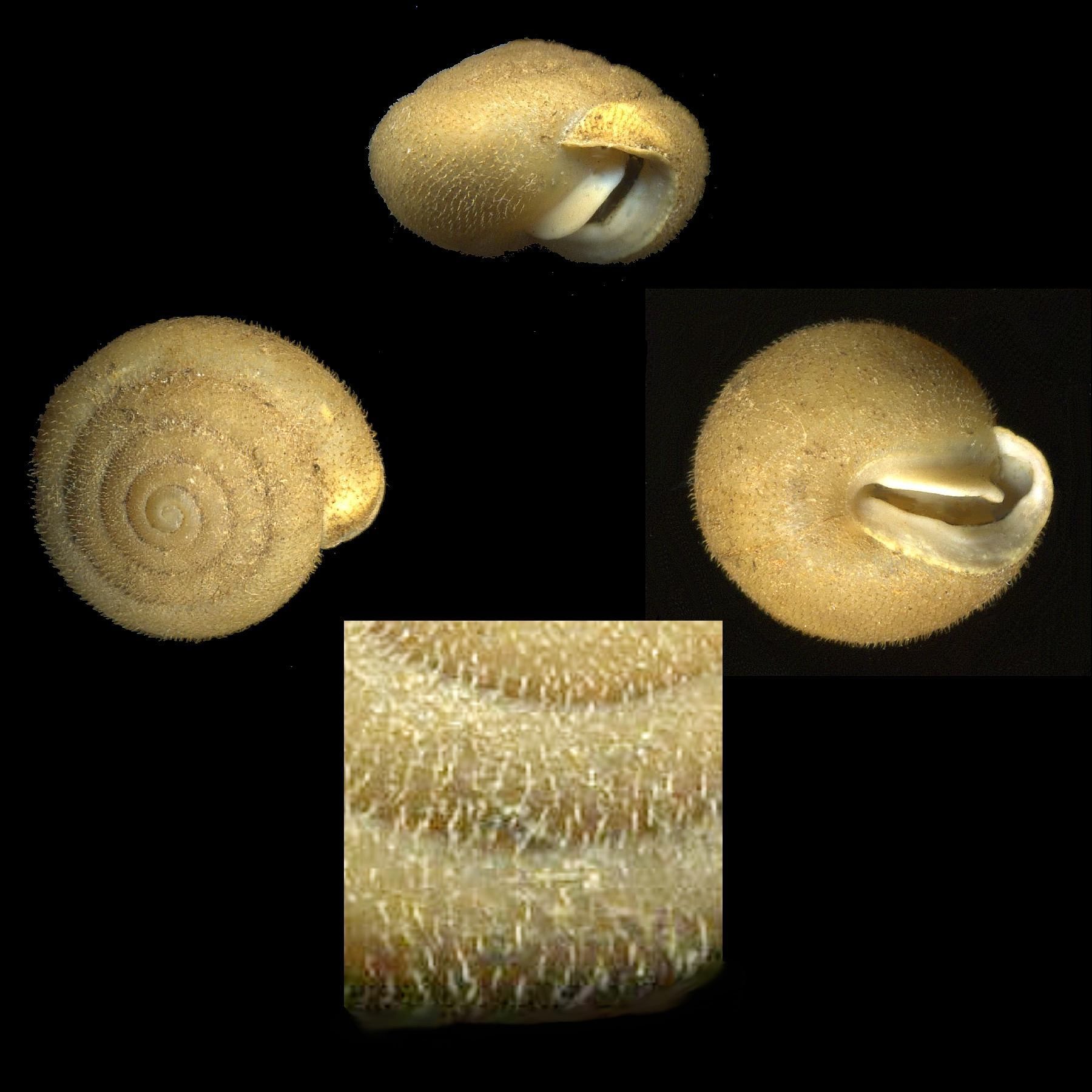
The shell of Stenotrema florida, a land snail or terrestrial gastropod. The periostracum of this species has minute hairs, giving the snail a velvety feel

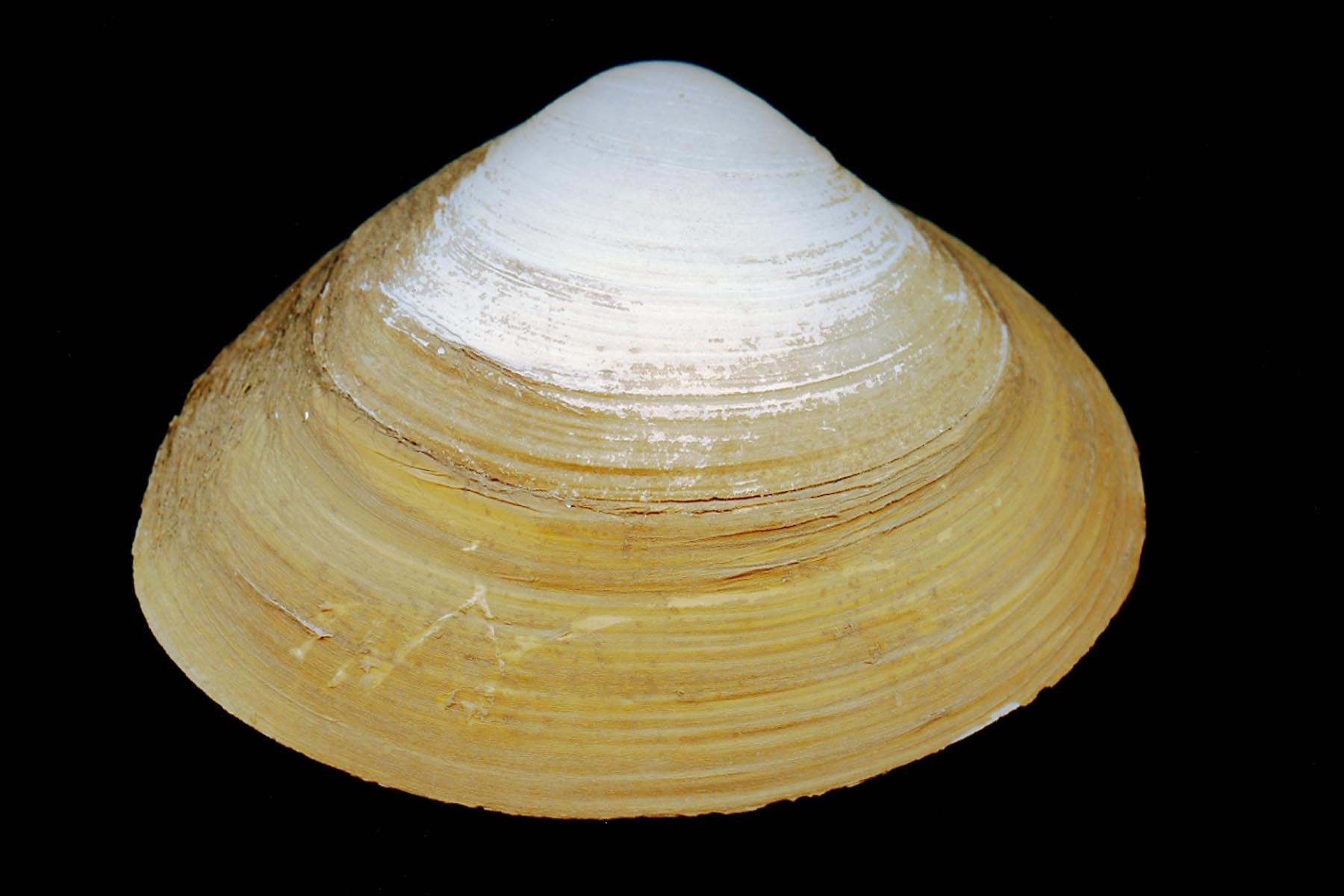
A yellowish tan periostracum is visible on the lower two thirds of this juvenile (8 cm) valve of the marine bivalve Spisula solidissima

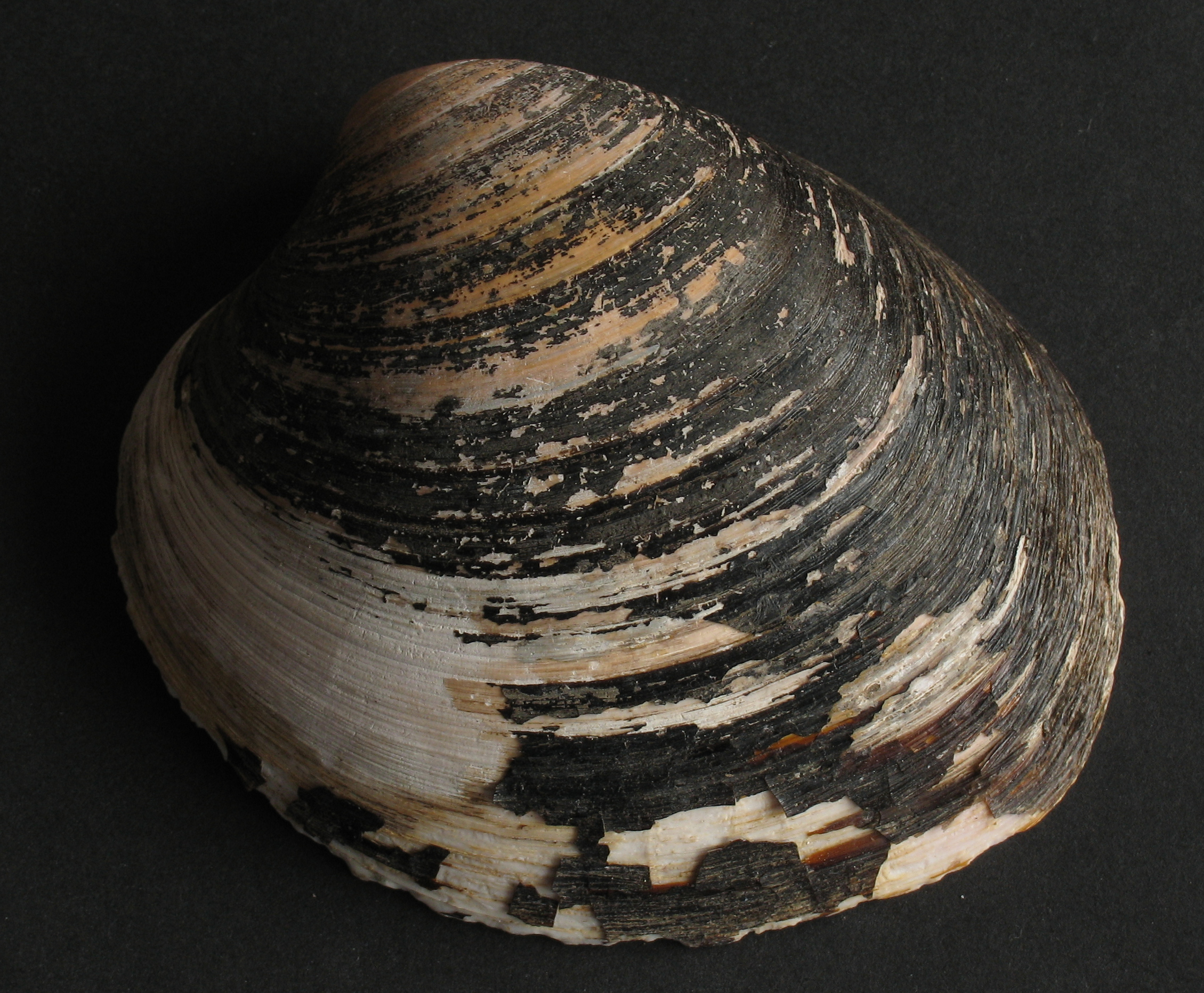
The dark periostracum is flaking off of this dried-out valve of the "ocean quahog", marine bivalve Arctica islandica, from Wales

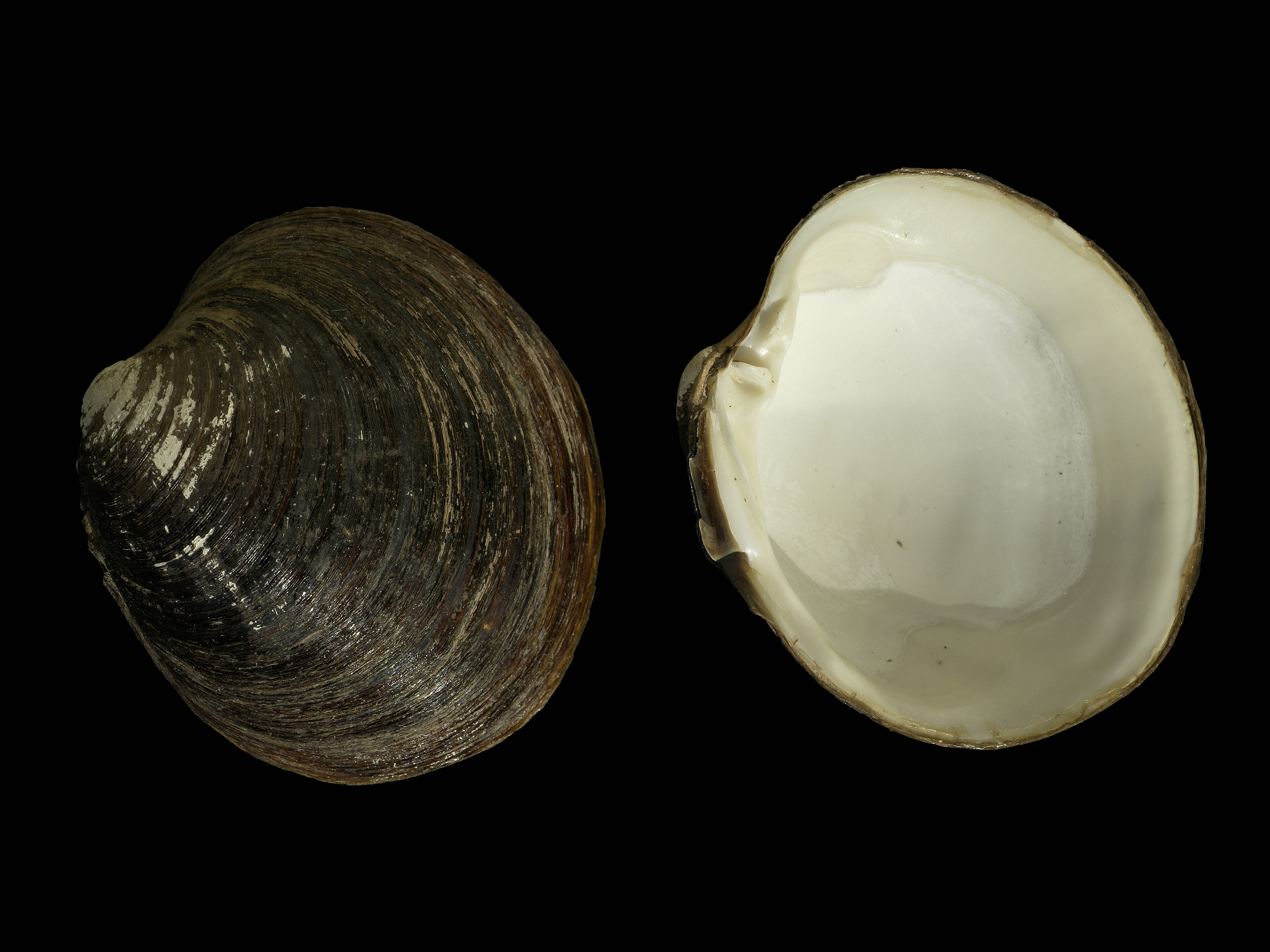
Fresher valves of Arctica islandica with periostracum intact. Note that the periostracum is partially worn off on the umbo, this is because the umbo is older than the rest of the shell and also projects more: it has been exposed to more abrasion during the life of the clam

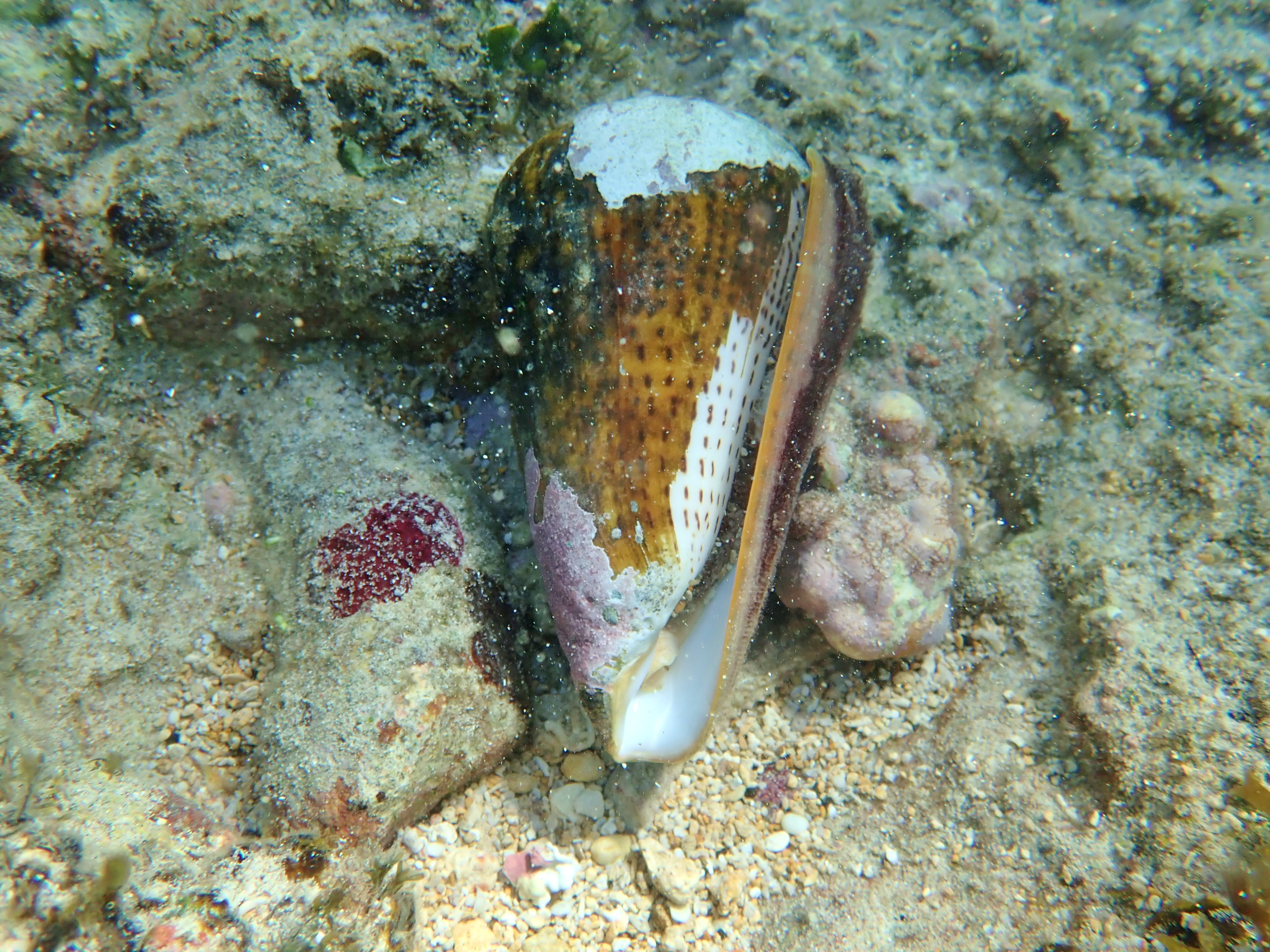
On this Conus leopardus, natural rubbing has eroded the periostracum in some parts of the shell.

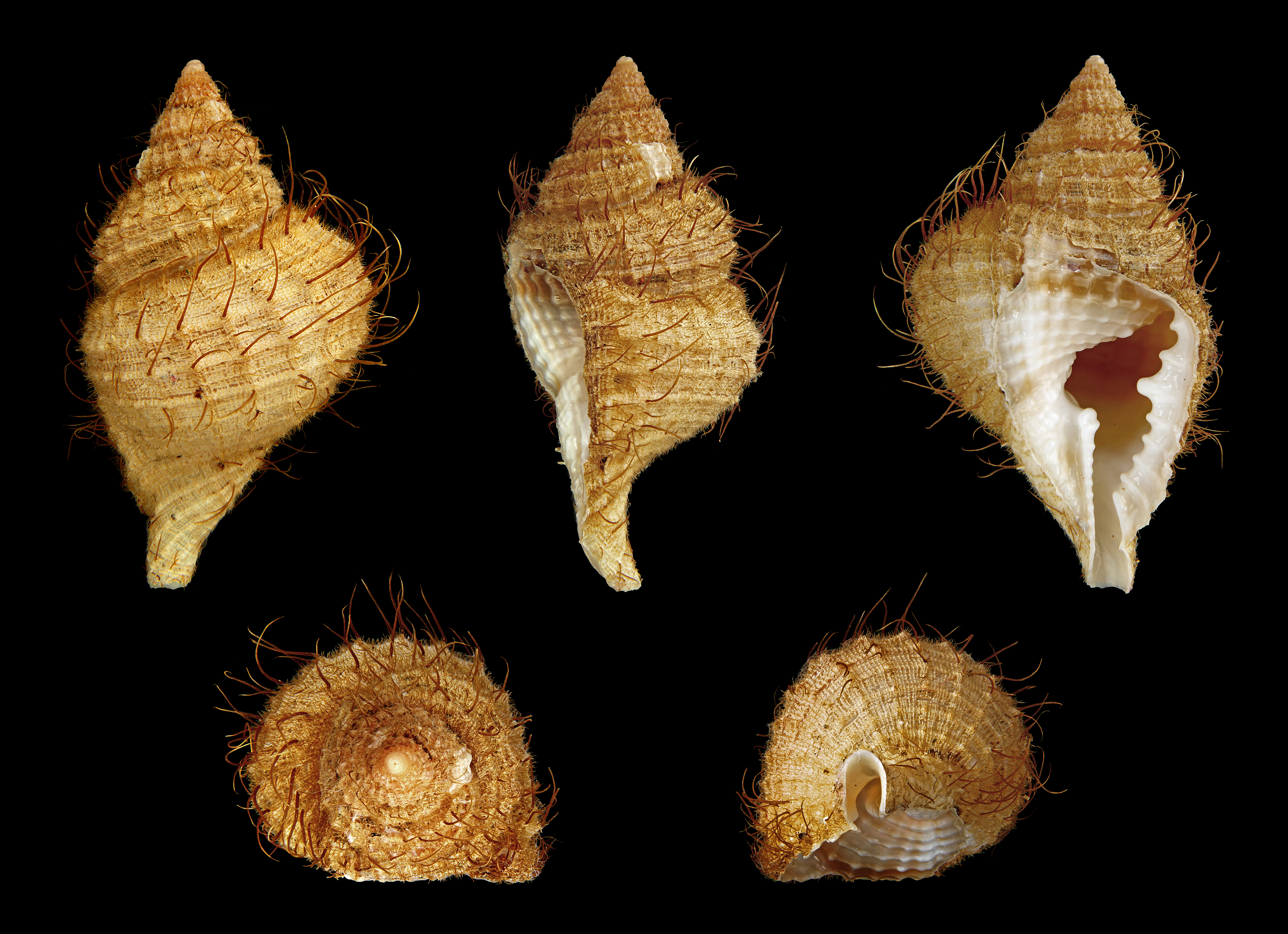
Distorsio ventricosa, an example of "hairy" gastropod.

The periostracum (/ˌpɛriˈɒstrəkəm/ PERR-ee-OS-trə-kəm) is a thin, organic coating (or "skin") that is the outermost layer of the shell of many shelled animals, including molluscs and brachiopods. Among molluscs, it is primarily seen in snails and clams, i.e. in gastropods and bivalves, but it is also found in cephalopods such as Allonautilus scrobiculatus. The periostracum is an integral part of the shell, and it forms as the shell forms, along with the other shell layers. The periostracum is used to protect the organism from corrosion.

The periostracum is visible as the outer layer of the shell of many molluscan species from terrestrial, freshwater, and marine habitats, and may be seen in land snails, river mussels, and other kinds of freshwater bivalves, as well as in many kinds of marine shelled molluscs.

The word periostracum means "around the shell", meaning that the periostracum is wrapped around what is usually the more calcareous part of the shell. Technically, the calcareous part of the shell can (at least in theory) be referred to as the "ostracum", but that term is only very rarely used.

== In molluscs ==
=== Composition ===
This shell layer is composed of a type of protein known as conchiolin. Conchiolin is largely composed of quinone-tanned proteins, which are similar to those found in the epidermal cuticle.

=== Function ===
The formation of a shell requires certain biological machinery. The shell is deposited within a small compartment, the extrapallial space, which is sealed from the environment by the periostracum, a leathery outer layer around the rim of the shell, where growth occurs. This caps off the extrapallial space, which is bounded on its other surfaces by the existing shell and the mantle. The periostracum acts as a framework from which the outer layer of carbonate can be suspended, but also, in sealing the compartment, allows the accumulation of ions in concentrations sufficient for crystallization to occur. The accumulation of ions is driven by ion pumps packed within the calcifying epithelium. The organic matrix forms the scaffold that directs crystallization, and the deposition and rate of crystals is also controlled by hormones produced by the mollusc. The periostracum was probably essential in allowing early molluscs to obtain large size with a single valve.

The periostracum is secreted from a groove in the mantle, termed the periostracal groove. When secreted, it consists of the soluble protein periostracin; this polymer becomes insoluble through a tanning process involving quinone.

=== Description ===
The periostracum is often yellowish or brownish in color. In some species it is black. The periostracum is very often a different color than the underlying layer of the shell.

In the shells of species that have periostracum, this shell layer is quite often physically worn away or chemically eroded in the parts of the shell that are older, thus it may only still be visible in the more recently formed areas of the shell.

Periostracum can in some cases be quite thin, smooth, glossy and transparent, such that it looks almost like a thin yellow varnish, or it can be thicker and more or less opaque. When it is thick it is often relatively rough in texture and dull. In some species the periostracum is tufted, or forms hair-like growths which in some cases can give the fresh shell a velvety feel. In some species the periostracum adheres very tightly to the underlying shell surface, in others the periostracum is less firmly attached.

In certain marine species, such as for example certain species of cone snails, a heavy periostracum obscures the color patterns that exist on the calcareous layer of the shell.

In many aquatic species, once a shell has been removed from the water and has had time to completely dry out, then the periostracum may become brittle and start to flake or peel off of the surface of the shell.

It is not uncommon for shell collectors to deliberately remove a periostracum layer (using household bleach) if they feel that a shell is more attractive without it. However the periostracum is an important part of the shell, and is definitely of interest to malacologists. Details of the periostracum can sometimes be very helpful in identifying a species.

==== Hairs on gastropod shells ====
Haired shells occur in gastropods in several species of the Stylommatophoran families Polygyridae, Helicidae and Hygromiidae. These families are only distantly related, suggesting that this feature has evolved several times independently. Haired shells are almost exclusively observed in species living in moist microhabitats, like layers of fallen leaves, broad-leaved vegetation, damp meadows or wet scree. Such a correlation suggests an adaptive significance of the trait in such a habitat; it was thus speculated that the hydrophobic hairs facilitate the movement in wet environments by relieving surface tension.

These hairs can reach varying densities (up to 20 per squaremilimetre) and lengths (up to three millimetres). In some cases hardly visible, they confer an almost furry impression to the shell in others. These semi-rigid structures are part of the periostracum, a thin protein layer (conchiolin) secreted by the snail to cover the calcareous shell. Building hairs requires the snail to have specialised glandular tissue and complex strategies to form them. Consequently, this trait can be assumed to be costly and should thus present a selective advantage to its bearers in order to be conserved.

Experiments by Pfenninger et al. (2005) on genus Trochulus showed an increased adherence of haired shells to wet surfaces. Haired shells appeared to be the ancestral character state, a feature most probably lost three times independently. The possession of hairs facilitates the adherence of the snails to their herbaceous food plants during foraging when humidity levels are high. The absence of hairs in some Trochulus species could thus be explained as a loss of the potential adaptive function linked to habitat shifts.

== In brachiopods ==
The periostracum of brachiopods is made of chitin. Relatively new cells on the edges of the brachiopod mantle secrete material that extends the periostracum, but are displaced on the upper side of the mantle by more recent cells, and switch to secreting the mineralized material of the shell valves.

== See also ==
- Byssus
- Seashell
  - Bivalve shell
  - Gastropod shell
- Lorica
