= Paleontology in Texas =

Paleontological research in U.S

The location of the state of Texas

Paleontology in Texas refers to paleontological research occurring within or conducted by people from the U.S. state of Texas. Author Marian Murray has said that "Texas is as big for fossils as it is for everything else." Some of the most important fossil finds in United States history have come from Texas. Fossils can be found throughout most of the state. The fossil record of Texas spans almost the entire geologic column from Precambrian to Pleistocene. Shark teeth are probably the state's most common fossil. During the early Paleozoic era Texas was covered by a sea that would later be home to creatures like brachiopods, cephalopods, graptolites, and trilobites. Little is known about the state's Devonian and early Carboniferous life. Evidence indicates that during the late Carboniferous the state was home to marine life, land plants and early reptiles. During the Permian, the seas largely shrank away, but nevertheless coral reefs formed in the state. The rest of Texas was a coastal plain inhabited by early relatives of mammals like Dimetrodon and Edaphosaurus. During the Triassic, a great river system formed in the state that was inhabited by crocodile-like phytosaurs. Little is known about Jurassic Texas, but there are fossil aquatic invertebrates of this age like ammonites in the state. During the Early Cretaceous local large sauropods and theropods left a great abundance of footprints. Later in the Cretaceous, the state was covered by the Western Interior Seaway and home to creatures like mosasaurs, plesiosaurs, and few icthyosaurs. Early Cenozoic Texas still contained areas covered in seawater where invertebrates and sharks lived. On land the state would come to be home to creatures like glyptodonts, mammoths, mastodons, saber-toothed cats, giant ground sloths, titanotheres, uintatheres, and dire wolves. Archaeological evidence suggests that local Native Americans knew about local fossils. Formally trained scientists were already investigating the state's fossils by the late 1800s. In 1938, a major dinosaur footprint find occurred near Glen Rose. Pleurocoelus was the Texas state dinosaur from 1997 to 2009, when it was replaced by Sauroposeidon (Paluxysaurus jonesi) after the Texan fossils once referred to the former species were reclassified to a new genus.

== Prehistory ==
During the Cambrian period, Texas was covered by a sea. Cambrian life in Texas included brachiopods, gastropods, graptolites, and trilobites. Areas of Texas distant from the shore were home to bivalves, brachiopods, sponges, and trilobites. Contemporary graptolites were preserved in the central region of the state. Texan wildlife during the ensuing Ordovician period included brachiopods, cephalopods, corals, gastropods, graptolites, sponges, and trilobites, although apart from the graptolites, these sorts of fossils tend to be poorly preserved. The graptolites were preserved in the Ordovician deposits of western Texas, especially some of the stratigraphic units of the Trans-Pecos region. In some places these graptolite fossils are common. The presence of these marine habitats distant from shore persisted into the Silurian. Few fossils were preserved locally during the former period. Silurian brachiopods and corals fossilized in the Van Horn and El Paso Regions.

Devonian Texas still contained marine habitats distant from shore. However, the state's Devonian rocks are buried below the surface and inaccessible apart from core drilling. Consequently, the contemporary life is not well known. Known life of Devonian Texas includes brachiopods, bryozoans, conodonts, corals, gastropods, radiolarians and trilobites. Contemporary brachiopods were preserved in great abundance, however their fossils tend to be fragmentary. Their remains were preserved in the El Paso, Van Horn, Llano Uplift, and Marathon areas. Contemporary radiolarian fossils are also very common in the El Paso, Van Horn, and Marathon areas, and like the brachiopods, their fossils tend to be fragmentary. Fossils of the other listed taxa were preserved in the Llano Uplift area. Vertebrates included armored fishes, also preserved in the Llano Uplift. Contemporary placoderms were preserved in central Texas.

Like the state's Devonian rocks, those of Early Carboniferous age are buried below the surface and inaccessible apart from core drilling. Consequently, the contemporary life is not well known. Texas was home to brachiopods, cephalopods, crinoids, gastropods, ostracods, trilobites during the Mississippian. Contemporary brachiopods were preserved in the Hueco Mountains of the Trans-Pecos Region and Llano Uplift. They tend to be the most common fossil in the Hueco Mountain sites. Contemporary bryozoan and gastropod fossils were preserved in the Hueco Mountains of the Trans-Pecos Region, but are less common. The other taxa's fossils were preserved in the Llano Uplift.

During the Late Carboniferous many fossils were preserved in the north-central part of the state. Texas had a fauna including algae, brachiopods, corals, crinoids, fusulinids, gastropods, and pelecypods during the Pennsylvanian epoch. Pennsylvanian fossils are widespread in Texas. Pennsylvanian fossils of the listed taxa were preserved in both the Diablo and Hueco Mountains. The Llano Uplift region also preserves Pennsylvanian fossils. The north-central region of the uplift is the best source. Pennsylvanian taxa preserved there included brachiopods, branching bryozoans, lacy bryozoans, horn corals, other corals, crinoids, fusulinids, gastropods, goniatites, nautiloids, and pelecypods. The contemporary vertebrate fauna included sharks, which left behind their teeth. Plant fossils were preserved in abundance in the Llano Uplift, north-central, and Trans Pecos Texas. Plant fossils from the latter two localities tended to be poorly preserved. Very early reptile fossils are also known from the deposits of the Llano Uplift.

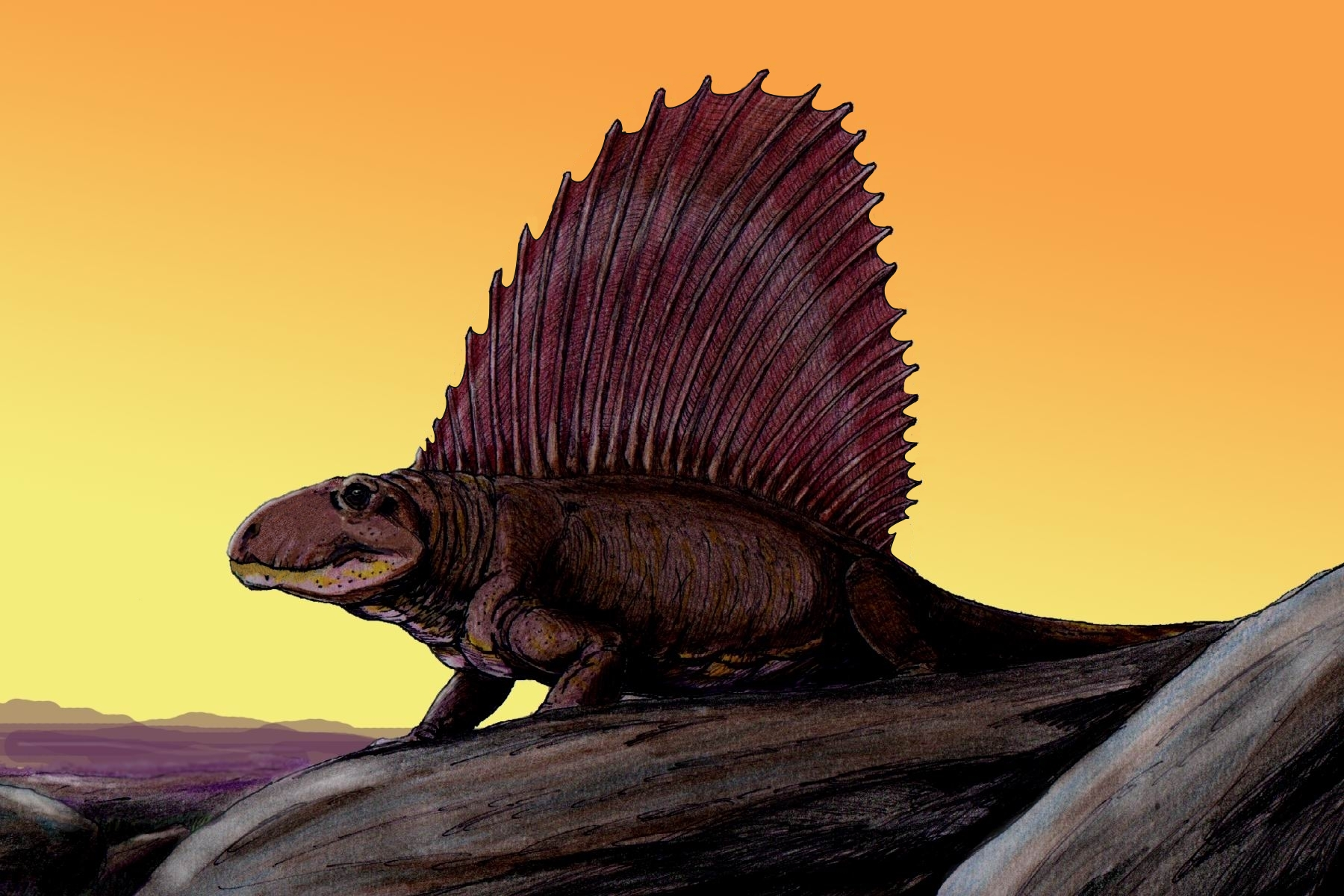
Dimetrodon.

Permian fossils are widespread in Texas. The shallow seas occupying this region began to retreat during the Permian. Coastal lowland environments formed in their place. However, the far western edge of Texas was still covered in sea water. A notable reef system formed there in the area now occupied by the Guadalupe Mountains. A great variety of marine invertebrates lived here. Brachiopods, bryozoans, corals, and mollusks were preserved in what are now the Glass Mountains. Local vertebrate life included sharks. In the North-Central Plains of Texas both marine and terrestrial fossils can be found. Invertebrates, amphibians, and reptiles are all known. Author Marian Murray described the region as "one of the finest collecting areas in the world for marine life". More than 320 kinds of crinoids are known from the region and more than 50 different kinds of blastoids as well. Sharks left behind their teeth to fossilize during the Permian. Amphibians and reptiles were preserved in Archer and Baylor counties during the Permian. The red beds from the region might be the best record of this time period in the world. Seymouria, a twenty inch long transitional form documenting the origin of reptiles was preserved in the Permian sediments of Baylor County. Baylor County and nearby regions also preserve Dimetrodon and Edaphosaurus. During the middle Permian, Texas was hot with dry and wet seasons attested to by playa lake deposits. Fossil footprints left by small reptiles are common in these sediments.

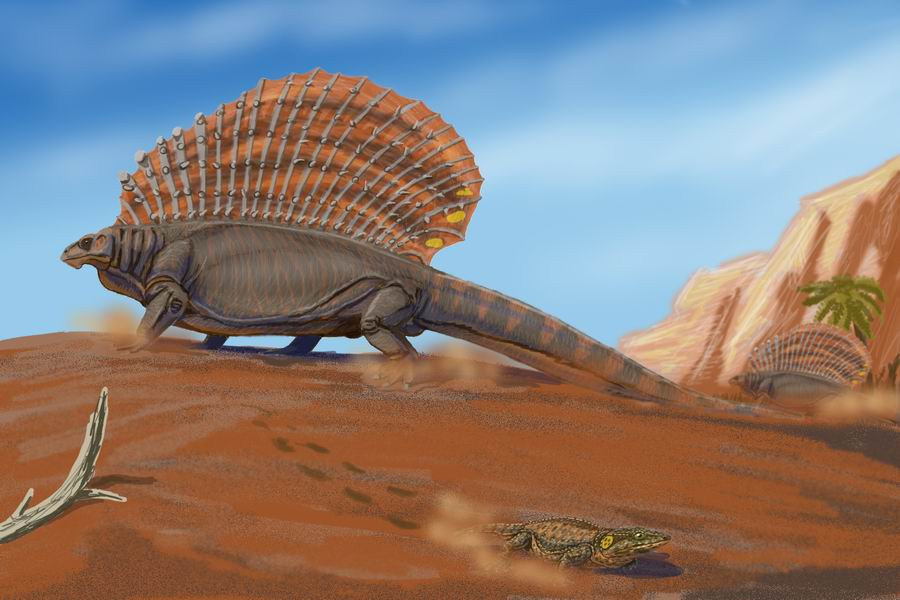
Edaphosaurus.

Texas was home to a massive river system during the Triassic. A variety of local amphibians and reptiles lived nearby. Triassic life in Texas also included plants and invertebrates, although their fossils tend to be poorly preserved. Sharks left behind their teeth to fossilize at this time. Vertebrates included fishes and relatives of modern crocodiles called phytosaurs. Triassic fossils were preserved in areas of western Texas like the Glass Mountains as well as the High Plains. The phytosaur fossils were preserved at the edge of the High Plains. There are very few rocks of Jurassic age in Texas. The only known Jurassic fossils of Texas come from the Malone Mountains which preserve ammonites, gastropods, and pelecypods.

The Cretaceous, by contrast left a rich local fossil record. Due to the alternating rising and falling of local sea levels a variety of life from both land and sea would be preserved in its fossil record. Cretaceous vertebrate life of Texas included amphibians, birds, dinosaurs, fish, and reptiles. Almost a quarter of Texas is covered by Cretaceous rocks and are a good source of fossils. Most of Texas was submerged under the Western Interior Seaway during the Cretaceous. The most common Cretaceous fossils in Texas are cephalopods, echinoids, gastropods, and pelecypods. During the Early Cretaceous Texas was home to the pliosaurid Brachauchenius. Western Interior Seaway researcher Michael J. Everhart has called it a "true 'sea monster'" of its time. Sharks left behind their teeth to fossilize during the Early Cretaceous. The Cretaceous sharks of Texas were similar to those of Kansas. The prehistoric bony fish of Texas are known largely from Cretaceous rocks. Fossils include mostly teeth, vertebrae, and scales, although sometimes well preserved skeletons are found in the Austin Chalk member. During the Turonian Texas was home to the fish Pachyrhizodus leptopsis. Early Cretaceous heart urchins and biscuit urchins. In places fossil sea cucumbers are abundant. During the late Albian, from about 115 to 110 million years ago sauropods and theropods left many footprints in the sediments that would later come to compose the Glen Rose Formation. The widely spaced limbs of the sauropod trackmakers suggest that they were likely brachiosaurids. Most of the tracks were left on an ancient coastal plain bordering the ancient Gulf of Mexico, although some were left in lagoonal sediments or intertidal areas. More than fifty different contemporary sites are known across Texas over. Paleontologists "recogniz[e]" two mega-tracksites in Texas with areas covering thousands of square miles. Texan marine invertebrates during the Late Cretaceous included belemnoids and abundant ostracods. Contemporary vertebrates included mosasaurs (preserved near Austin), short-necked plesiosaurs (preserved near Waco), and some icthyosaurs( Platypterygius) found in the Grayson Formation and Duck Creek Formation. Forty foot Tylosaurus swam over Texas during the Campanian. More sharks left behind their teeth to fossilize during the Late Cretaceous. The terrestrial flora of Late Cretaceous Texas left behind plant fossils in northern Texas.

During the early Cenozoic, Texas was the site of significant volcanic eruptions. Ostracods remained common in the Tertiary seas of Texas. Segments left by ophiuroids are also common in rocks deposited in these marine environments. Other contemporary life included corals, clams, and snails. These Tertiary fossils are known from the Gulf Coastal Plain. Sharks left behind their teeth to fossilize during the Tertiary. During the Oligocene camels were widespread in Texas. Mammals resembling giant pigs were preserved in the Miocene deposits of the Coastal Plain. Camels remained widespread in the state. Sharks left behind fossil teeth during the Miocene, but not during the later epochs of the Cenozoic. Camels maintained a continued presence as significant members of the fauna during the Pliocene. During the Pleistocene Texas was home to camels, horses, mammoths, and other animals. Their fossils are common. Horses in particular were widespread in Texas during the Pleistocene. Camels were also widespread but for the last time in Texas history. Fossils of this age from the Gulf Coast and western part of the state included the remains of creatures like bison, mammoths, and mastodons. Other Cenozoic mammals of Texas included glyptodonts, mammoths, mastodons, saber teeth, giant ground sloths, titanotheres, uintatheres, and dire wolves.

== History ==
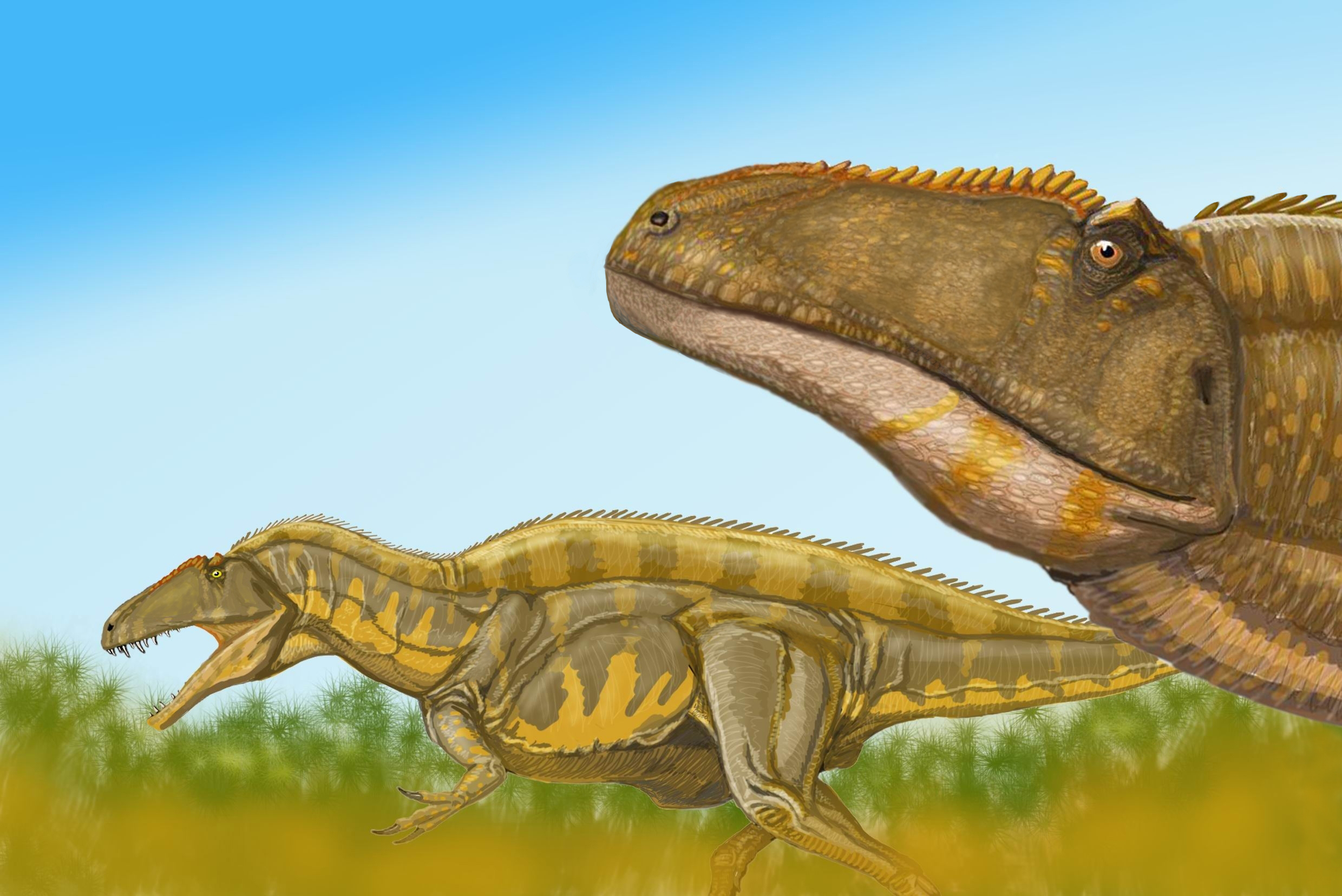
Acrocanthosaurus.

Archaeologist Jack. T. Hughes has found evidence that the paleo-Indians of Texas collected fossils. After the establishment of paleontology as a formal science, in 1878, professor Jacob Boll made the first scientifically documented Texan fossil finds in Archer and Wichita counties while collecting fossils on behalf of Edward Drinker Cope. In 1880 W. E. Cummins began a series of expeditions into Texas and other regions of the American southwest. Like Boll, Cummins was collecting for Cope. C. H. Sternberg also did "very successful" fieldwork in Texas between 1896 and 1917. In 1938, Barnum Brown of the American Museum of Natural History sent Roland T. Bird to Texas in search of dinosaur footprints uncovered by local moonshiners. At the town of Glen Rose he noticed a medium-sized footprint left by a carnivorous dinosaur in a limestone block forming part of the Somervell County courthouse's bandstand. Local residents guided him to yet further carnivorous dinosaur tracks preserved in situ along the Paluxy River. While he was cleaning mud from these footprints, he noticed another kind of footprint, apparently left by a long-necked sauropod dinosaur. Brown was intrigued by the find. At the time, Dr. E. H. Sellards of the University of Texas was organizing the Texas Statewide Paleontological Survey. Brown arranged for a collaborative expedition between the American Museum of Natural History and the Survey. In 1940, Bird resumed his Texas fieldwork with the help of paleontologists from the Survey and labor employed by the Works Progress Administration. Some of the tracks excavated here were sent to the American Museum of Natural History and incorporated into an exhibit featuring Allosaurus and Apatosaurus even though they were 35 million years older than the dinosaurs that left behind the tracks in Texas and aren't even known from the state. Other track fossils uncovered during these excavations were sent to institutions like Baylor University, Brooklyn College, the United States National Museum, Southern Methodist University, and the University of Texas. In 1964 Bob Slaughter found two genera of mosasaurs south of Dallas as well as Miocene and Pleistocene fossils from the Livingston Reservoir basin. In 1994, Bill Sarjeant and Wann Langston published a monograph documenting fossil footprints laid down in the volcanic ash of the Vieja Group 36 to 38 million years ago during the late Eocene. They observed the tracks of six birds, two invertebrates, nineteen mammals, and two turtles. Among the mammals were relatives of camels and tapirs as well as carnivores and insectivores. This monograph was the culmination of almost twenty years of research and its subject the most spectacular known Tertiary-aged fossil tracksite in the western United States.

== Protected areas ==
- Dinosaur Valley State Park
- Big Thicket National Preserve

== Natural history museums ==
- Brazos Valley Museum of Natural History, Bryan
- Centennial Museum and Chihuahuan Desert Gardens, El Paso
- Heard Natural Science Museum and Wildlife Sanctuary, McKinney
- Houston Museum of Natural Science, Houston
- Mayborn Museum Complex, Waco
- Museum of Nature & Science, Dallas
- Naranjo Museum of Natural History, Lufkin
- Texas Science & Natural History Museum, Austin
- Texas Through Time, Hillsboro
- Whiteside Museum of Natural History, Seymour
- Witte Museum, San Antonio

== Notable clubs and associations ==
- Austin - Paleontological Society of Austin (http://www.austinpaleo.org/)
- Dallas Paleontological Society (http://www.dallaspaleo.org/)
- Houston Gem & Mineral Society

== See also ==
- Paleontology in Arkansas
- Paleontology in Louisiana
- Paleontology in New Mexico
- Paleontology in Oklahoma
