= The Mysterious Origins of Man =

Pseudoarchaeological television special

- Genre: Documentary
- Written by: John Cheshire; Bill Cote
- Directed by: Bill Cote
- Narrated by: Charlton Heston
- Composer: Fritz Heede

Production
- Producers: John Cheshire; Bill Cote; Carol Cote
- Cinematography: Bill Cote
- Running time: 46 minutes
- Production company: BC Video Inc.

Original release
- Network: NBC
- Release: February 25, 1996

The Mysterious Origins of Man is a pseudoarchaeological television special that originally aired on NBC on February 25, 1996. Hosted by Charlton Heston, the program presents the fringe theory that mankind has lived on the Earth for tens of millions of years, and that mainstream scientists have suppressed the fossil evidence for this. Some material included was based on Forbidden Archeology, a 1993 book written by Hindu creationists Michael Cremo and Richard L. Thompson about anomalous archeological finds reported mainly in early scientific journals. The film covers topics such as The Paluxy tracks, the Zuiyo-maru carcass, the Missing Link, the Java Man, Lucy, Tiwanaku, Stonehenge, the Giza pyramids, the Piri Reis map, Atlantis, and the Pole shift hypothesis.

== Interviewees ==
- Michael Cremo, co-author of Forbidden Archeology
- Richard Thompson, co-author of Forbidden Archeology
- Virginia Steen-McIntyre, PhD, geologist
- Carl Baugh, anthropologist and young-Earth creationist
- David Hatcher Childress, author
- Richard Milton, author of Shattering the Myths of Darwinism
- Graham Hancock, author of Fingerprints of the Gods
- Robert Bauval, author of The Orion Mystery
- Rand Flem-Arth, co-author of When the Sky Fell

== Reception ==
The program was widely criticized by the scientific community. Donald Johanson said it was "absolutely shameful, and it sort of sets us back 100 years". Jim Foley of TalkOrigins called it a "pseudo-scientific mishmash of discredited claims and crackpot ideas". However, the criticism did not prevent NBC from re-broadcasting the special on June 8, 1996. In response, John Carman wrote in the San Francisco Chronicle, "You'd think the NBC brass would be a touch embarrassed by the program, and eager to let the little furor fritter away into oblivion. But then you really would be a simpleton. NBC, a subsidiary of the science giant General Electric, does not exist to sharpen minds. Science, schmience. If there was money to be made from it, NBC would tell you the Earth is flat because of repeated indentations from space aliens on pogo sticks."

Dave Thomas wrote in Skeptical Briefs that "quality science was nowhere to be found" in the program, as it had people of questionable credentials interviewed and failed to interview the leading researchers in their respective fields. Thomas further explained the show failed to challenge the extraordinary claims.

Creationist Ken Ham criticized the production in the February 1996 Answers in Genesis newsletter in a review titled "Hollywood's 'Moses' Undermines Genesis". Ham attacked fellow creationist Baugh's claims, saying, "According to leading creationist researchers, this evidence is open to much debate and needs much more intensive research. One wonders how much of the information in the program can really be trusted!"

== See also ==
- The Mystery of the Sphinx
