= Footprints in Stone =

- Release date: 1973
- Country: United States
- Language: English

Footprints in Stone is a 1973 (Note: Sources disagree with regard to dating of the publication of the film. Some suggest a late-1972 publication and others put forward early 1973.) American young earth creationist (YEC) documentary created and narrated by Reverend Stanley Taylor. The film puts forward YEC arguments that alleged fossilized footprints of supposedly-human origin found in and around Dinosaur Valley State Park in Texas, alongside those of non-Avian dinosaurs, cast doubt on biological evolution. The film was circulated widely in the United States.

== Premise ==
By the time of the film's development, YECs were fascinated by fossilized footprints pulled from in and around what had then been recently designated as "Dinosaur Valley State Park" near the town of Glen Rose. Preserved dinosaur footprints had been frequently found along the Paluxy River that runs through the site, including some of the earliest known sauropod prints. Many dinosaur prints were colocated with prints resembling those of modern humans, and YECs argued that these findings were evidence against biological evolution.

Some such tracks had been dismissed as forgeries, such as those produced by Tucson YEC Clifford Burdock. To the exclusion of such forgeries, Reverend Taylor filmed only prints "in situ" near the Paluxy.

== Production ==
Footprints was produced by the "Films for Christ association", then of Peoria, Illinois, and headed by Reverend Taylor himself. YEC geologist Berney Neufeld wrote in 1975, that some tracks in the film "can be seen under normal circumstances only with the application of a great deal of imagination." Such tracks were "wet" by the film crew in order to increase their visibility on screen using oil or water. The documentary had a final runtime of around 43 minutes upon release in 1973.

== Plot ==
The documentary opens and closes with the Paluxy River Song. The song was written by Marian Taylor and sung by Sunny Flemming. After the introductory song, Reverend Taylor outlines the "evolutionist" theory for the development of life on Earth and contrasts it with those of YECs, which he refers to as "Special Creation". A number of locals are then interviewed about "mantracks" from the Paluxy site and people of different ages and sizes place their feet in various tracks. The film recruits two unusually tall men from Chicago and New York City to place their feet in larger tracks.

The film includes criticism by old earth creationist skeptics of the "mantracks", including those of a number of individuals presented as "scientists" in the film, and responds to their claims. The attitudes of such skeptics range from partially agreeable to the film's claims to openly dismissive of them.

== Reception ==
Upon its release, Footprints in Stone was circulated widely. It was shown in many schools and churches throughout the United States to the extent that "Paluxy" became a household name among American creationists. The film proved particularly popular among American YEC groups such as the Institute for Creation Research and Creation Research Society.

The film returned to prominence in the early 1980s, owing to the efforts of YEC reverend Carl Baugh. Baugh and other affiliated YECs received substantial media coverage at this time. Baugh later founded the Creation Evidence Museum near the site of the tracks from Footprints in Stone. At that time, YEC efforts began to have an affect on science education in the United States.

== Withdrawal ==
In 1985, Paul Taylor, son of the late Stanley Taylor was shown the site on which Footprints in Stone was filmed by independent investigator Glen Kuban. That same year, Taylor announced that Films for Christ would stop all new distributions of Footprints in Stone. The younger Taylor subsequently withdrew copies of the film from circulation.

== Scientific explanations ==
Biologist Massimo Pigliucci wrote that biologists during the 1980s, when controversy over the Paluxy Petrosomatoglyphs became prominent, had clearly demonstrated that the prints were not made by humans. He suggested that the controversial tracks, commingled fakes not withstanding, represented metatarsal dinosaur tracks. Indeed, researchers from the Seventh-day Adventist-affiliated Loma Linda University determined as early as 1975 that the tracks depicted in Footprints were either of dinosaurian origin or were not animal tracks at all, but rather were the products of erosion.

== Bibliography ==
- Godfrey, Laurie R. (1981). "An Analysis of the Creationist Film, Footprints in Stone". Creation/Evolution. 2 (4): 23–30.
- Hastings, Ronnie J. (September 1988). "The Rise and Fall of the Paluxy Mantracks". Perspectives on Science and Christian Faith. 40 (3). American Scientific Affiliation: 144–154.
- McIver, Tom (3 November 1994). "A Little Bit East of Eden". San Diego Reader.

Moore, Randy (2014). "Did Humans Live with Dinosaurs? Excavating "Man Tracks" along the Paluxy River". The American Biology Teacher. 76 (4): 243–246. doi:10.1525/abt.2014.76.4.5.

- Neufeld, Berney R. (March 1975). "Footprints in Stone". The Ministry. 48 (3): 14–16.
- Pigliucci, Massimo (2002). Denying Evolution: Creationism, Scientism, and the Nature of Science. Sunderland, Massachusetts: Sinauer Associates. ISBN 978-0-87893-659-5.

Platt, Brian F.; Suarez, Celina A.; Boss, Stephen K.; Williamson, Malcolm; Cothren, Jackson; Kvamme, Jacqueline A. C. (2018). "LIDAR-based characterization and conservation of the first theropod dinosaur trackways from Arkansas, USA". PLOS ONE. 13 (1) e0190527. Bibcode:2018PLoSO..1390527P. doi:10.1371/journal.pone.0190527. PMC 5749850. PMID 29293618.

- Schadewald, Robert (1986). "Scientific Creationism and Error". Creation/Evolution. 6 (1): 2–9.
