= Creation Evidence Museum =

Creationist museum in Texas

Coordinates: 32.23028°N 97.80533°W

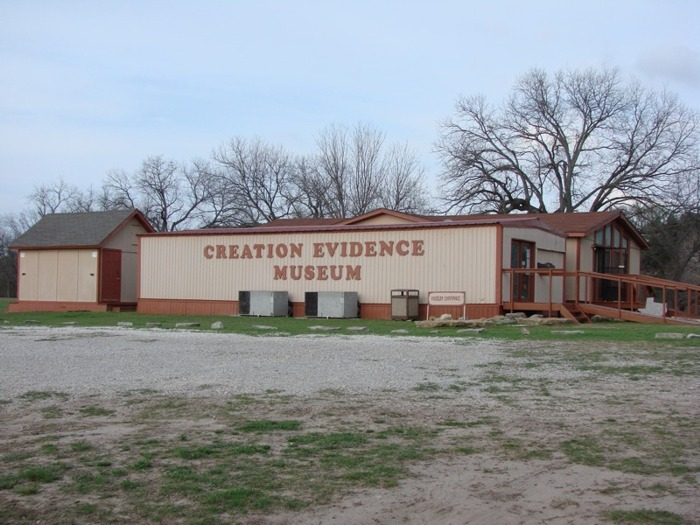
Temporary museum building

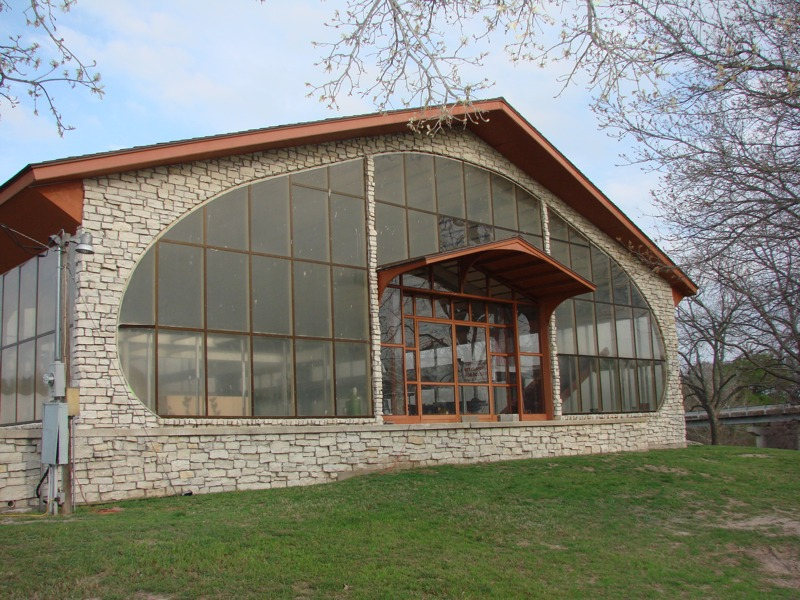
New museum building

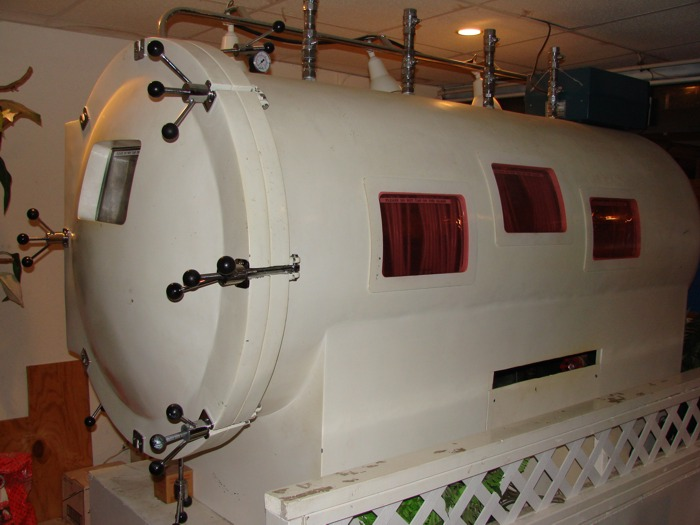
The first hyperbaric biosphere

The Creation Evidence Museum of Texas, originally Creation Evidences Museum, is a creationist museum in Glen Rose in Somervell County in central Texas, United States. Founded in 1984 by Carl Baugh for the purpose of researching and displaying exhibits that support creationism, it portrays the Earth as six thousand years old and humans coexisting with non-avian dinosaurs, disputing that the Earth is approximately 4.5 billion years old and non-avian dinosaurs became extinct 65.5 million years before human beings arose.

== History and projects ==
The Creation Evidence Museum was founded by Carl Baugh, a young Earth creationist, after he came to Glen Rose in 1982 to research claims of fossilized human footprints alongside dinosaur footprints in the limestone banks of the Paluxy River, near Dinosaur Valley State Park. He claims to have excavated 475 dinosaur footprints and 86 human footprints, which form the basis of the Creation Evidence Museum as well as other exhibits. Baugh, who does not have an accredited degree, remains the director and main speaker for CEM.

In 2001 Baugh and Creation Evidence Museum were featured on The Daily Show where Baugh likened human history to The Flintstones and the show poked fun at his claims about the hyperbaric biosphere, pterodactyl expeditions, and dinosaurs.

The Creation Evidence Museum sponsors continuing paleontological and archaeological excavations among other research projects, including a hunt for living pterodactyls in Papua New Guinea, and expeditions to Israel. Materials from the museum have been recommended by the National Council on Bible Curriculum in Public Schools, but the NCBCPS curriculum has been deemed "unfit for use in public school classrooms."

One of the museum's projects is a "hyperbaric biosphere", a chamber which the museum hopes will reproduce the atmospheric conditions that these creationists postulate for Earth before the Great Flood. Baugh says that these conditions made creatures live longer, and get larger, smarter and nicer. He claims that tests under these conditions have tripled the lifespan of fruit-flies, and detoxified copperhead snakes. A much larger version is under construction in the new building.

In 2008, a descendant of a family that provided many original Paluxy River dinosaur tracks in the 1930s claimed that her grandfather had faked many of them, including the Alvis Delk Cretaceous Footprint. Zana Douglas, the granddaughter of George Adams, explained that during the 1930s depression her grandfather and other residents of Glen Rose made money by making moonshine and selling "dinosaur fossils". The faux fossils brought $15 to $30 and when the supply ran low, they "just carved more, some with human footprints thrown in."

In 2015, Baugh said the museum was receiving 15,000 visitors annually.

== Exhibits ==
All of the creationist exhibits have been strongly criticized as incorrectly identified dinosaur prints, other fossils, or outright forgeries. The second floor balcony of the museum features prominently a 12 feet (3.7 m) high statue of Dallas Cowboys football coach Tom Landry.

Displays in the Creation Evidence Museum include:

- The "London Artifact", also known as the "London Hammer", an out-of-place artifact found in 1934 in London, Texas. This is a hammer "of recent American historical style" (18th or 19th century) found in a limestone concretion that has been claimed to be Ordovician period or Cretaceous rock. It was examined by scientists who concluded that the stone had not necessarily been part of the surrounding rock formation but could have formed around the hammer relatively recently: "The stone is real, and it looks impressive to someone unfamiliar with geological processes.... Minerals in solution can harden around an intrusive object dropped in a crack or simply left on the ground if the source rock (in this case, reportedly Ordovician) is chemically soluble."
- The "Burdick Track", a human footprint in Cretaceous rock. Glen J. Kuban and geologist Gregg Wilkerson described anatomical errors in the "footprint", and remains of algae which indicate that it was carved into the bottom of a limestone slab, similar to other tracks that were carved in the Dinosaur Valley State Park area.
- The "Fossilized Human Finger", a finger where tissues appear to have been replaced by Cretaceous stone. The stone was not found in situ and according to Mark Isaak "looks remarkably similar in size and shape to the cylindrical sandstone infillings of Ophiomoipha or Thalassmoides shrimp burrows commonly found in Cretaceous rocks. Although its general shape is fingerlike, it has none of the fine structure one would expect from a finger."
- The "Meister Print", two trilobites in slate that appear to be crushed in a sandal print. The print is "questionable on several accounts" such as the shallowness of the print, spall patterns, striding sequence, and similarities to the Wheeler formation. "In short, the trilobites in the specimen are real enough, but the 'print' itself appears to be due solely to inorganic, geologic phenomena," according to Kuban.
- The "Hand Print in Stone", allegedly a hand print in Cretaceous rock. Baugh has provided no evidence it was in situ in any Cretaceous bed, nor allowed experts to inspect it. Creationists have been critical of it too.
- The "Alvis Delk Cretaceous Footprint", allegedly a human footprint partially overlapped by an Acrocanthosaurus dinosaur footprint, found when a slab supposedly taken from Glen Rose was later cleaned up. The footprint is presented as representing Homo bauanthropus, a species name coined by Baugh but not recognized by anyone else. Biologist PZ Myers described it as a blatant fake. The "human print has toes like tubes and a weirdly dug-in big toe", while "the dino print is even worse — it’s basically a three-pronged flat plate" with no resemblance to a real dinosaur footprint. Kuban described anatomical problems in detail. He notes that the slab was not documented in situ, and there are significant issues with CT scans claimed to authenticate the slab. Other creationists have not supported the claims, and one of those originally promoting the slab has removed the information from his website.

In 1982–1984, several scientists, including J.R. Cole, L.R. Godfrey, R.J. Hastings, and Steven Schafersman, examined Baugh's purported "mantracks" as well as others provided by creationists in Glen Rose. In the course of the examination "Baugh contradicted his own earlier reports of the locations of key discoveries" and many of the supposed prints "lacked characteristics of human footprints." After a three-year investigation of the tracks and Baugh's specimens, the scientists concluded there was no evidence for any of Baugh's claims or any "dinosaur-man tracks".

== Criticism from creationists ==
Young Earth creationist organizations such as Answers in Genesis and Creation Ministries International have criticized Baugh's claims saying he "muddied the water for many Christians ... People are being misled." Don Batten, of Creation Ministries International wrote: "Some Christians will try to use Baugh's 'evidences' in witnessing and get 'shot down' by someone who is scientifically literate. The ones witnessed to will thereafter be wary of all creation evidences and even more inclined to dismiss Christians as nut cases not worth listening to." Answers in Genesis lists the "Paluxy tracks" as arguments "we think creationists should NOT use" [emphasis in original]. The old Earth creationist organization Answers In Creation also reviewed Baugh's museum and concluded "the main artifacts they claim show a young earth reveal that they are deceptions, and in many cases, not even clever ones."

The "Burdick track" and "fossilized finger" were featured on the controversial NBC program The Mysterious Origins of Man, aired in 1996 and hosted by Charlton Heston. Creationist Ken Ham criticized the production in the February 1996 Answers in Genesis newsletter in a review titled "Hollywood's 'Moses' Undermines Genesis." Ham attacked Baugh's claims, saying, "According to leading creationist researchers, this evidence is open to much debate and needs much more intensive research. One wonders how much of the information in the program can really be trusted!"

== See also ==
- Creation Museum, museum in Northern Kentucky
- Dinosaur Adventure Land, bankrupt theme park in Pensacola, Florida by Kent Hovind
- Glen Rose dinosaur-human hoax
- ICR Discovery Center for Science & Earth History
- List of museums in North Texas
- List of museums in Texas
