= Moab Man =

Archaeological find in Utah, United States

The Moab Man (also called "Malachite man") is a find of several human skeletons found after bulldozing in a mine whose rock dated to the Early Cretaceous period, about 140 million years ago. The original discovery of two individuals was made in 1971 by Lin Ottinger in the Keystone Azurite Mine near Moab, Utah, and has been used by creationists as an argument for humans coexisting with dinosaurs. John Marwitt, an archaeologist and the field director for the Utah Archaeological Survey, examined the fossils and concluded that the fossils were probably only hundreds of years old, the result of burials of Native Americans.

== Debated fossil status and age ==
In the 1980s, Paluxy Creationist Carl Baugh purchased a "Moab Man" skeleton from Ottinger; the skeleton was displayed in the Creation Evidence Museum in Glen Rose, Texas, as evidence of humans living at the same time as dinosaurs. The Creation Evidence Museum also housed a collection of supposedly human fossil footprints, vertebrate and invertebrate fossils, and fossils attributed to various dinosaur genera, including a mislabeled pubis and ischium assigned to Acrocanthosaurus and a solitary "Y-shaped" fossil assigned the name "Unicerosaurus" (Armstrong, 1987, identified this fossil as belonging to a fish Xiphactinus). Studies over the years had concluded that the fossil "human" footprints were actually "forms of elongate dinosaur tracks, while others were selectively highlighted erosional markings, and still others (on loose blocks) probable carvings."

Later examination of the "Moab Man" skeletons indicate that they are unfossilized remains that were subject to an intrusive burial, and have been carbon dated to between 210 and 1450 years old (Berger and Protsch, 1989; Coulam and Schroedl, 1995).

== See also ==
- Meister Print
- London Hammer
- Out-of-place artifact
