= Carl Baugh =

American Christian creationist

- Born: Carl Edward Baugh; October 21, 1936 (age 89); Kenedy, Texas, United States
- Known for: Advocate of young Earth creationism
- Website: www.creationevidence.org

Carl Edward Baugh (born October 21, 1936) is an American young Earth creationist. Baugh has claimed to have discovered human footprints alongside non-avian dinosaur footprints near the Paluxy River in Texas. Baugh promoted creationism as the former host of the Creation in the 21st Century TV program on the Trinity Broadcasting Network.

The scientific community considers his claims pseudoscience. The creationist groups Answers in Genesis and Answers in Creation have characterized his claims as incorrect or deceptive. Baugh claims to have multiple doctorates, all of which are from unaccredited schools. He was also the president and a graduate of Pacific International University, an unaccredited university located in Springfield, Missouri.

== Biography ==
Born in Kenedy, Texas, Baugh graduated in 1955 from Abilene High School in Abilene, Texas. He formerly appeared on Trinity Broadcasting Network program Creation in the 21st Century. Baugh was also the president and a graduate of the unaccredited Pacific International University.

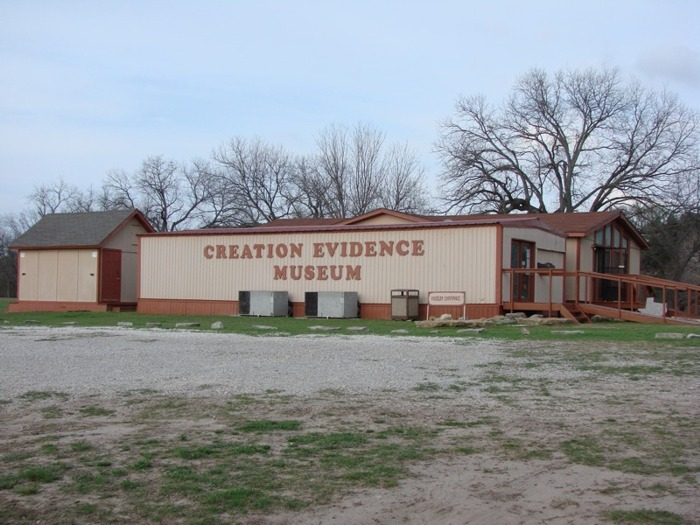
Original museum building

In 1984, Baugh started the Creation Evidence Museum in a double-wide trailer in Glen Rose, Texas, near Dinosaur Valley State Park, to promote creationism. The museum exhibits have been strongly criticized by scientists as incorrectly identified dinosaur prints, other fossils, or outright forgeries. In 2008, a descendant of a family that found many original Paluxy River dinosaur tracks in the 1930s claimed that her grandfather had faked many of them. Others, such as purported dinosaur claws, were identified by University of Texas at Austin paleontologist Wann Langston as crocodile teeth.

In 1996, Baugh presented his "man-tracks" in the widely criticized program The Mysterious Origins of Man. Creationist Ken Ham, of Answers in Genesis, criticized the claims in a review titled "Hollywood's 'Moses' Undermines Genesis," regarding Baugh: "According to leading creationist researchers, this evidence is open to much debate and needs much more intensive research. One wonders how much of the information in the program can really be trusted!" He also has been given television exposure by the tele-evangelist Kenneth Copeland. He has authored several self-published books on such topics as the age of the universe, dinosaurs coexisting with humans and critiques of evolution.

In 2001 Baugh and Creation Evidence Museum were featured on The Daily Show where Baugh likened human history to The Flintstones and the show poked fun at his claims about the hyperbaric biosphere, pterodactyl expeditions, and dinosaurs.

He is a promoter of intelligent design. In 2002 he appeared with William A. Dembski at a conference in Texas and has built his more recent web material around ID and Dembski.

== Claims ==
Both scientists and creationists have criticized Baugh's claims. Between 1982 and 1984, several scientists (including J.R. Cole, L.R. Godfrey, R.J. Hastings, and S.D. Schafersman) examined Baugh's purported "mantracks" as well as others provided by creationists in the Glen Rose Formation. In the course of the examination, "Baugh contradicted his own earlier reports of the locations of key discoveries" and many of the supposed prints "lacked human characteristics." After a three-year investigation of the tracks and Baugh's specimens, the scientists concluded there was no evidence of any of Baugh's claims or any "dinosaur-man tracks".

On September 27, 1984, Al West, a Baugh co-worker for two years, who followed the mantrack claims since 1974, and friend of Glen Kuban, publicly announced that Baugh "never had evidence for manprints as claimed." Gayle Golden, writer for The Dallas Morning News, reported that Baugh "paid $10,000 for his Moab skeleton and confirmed that Baugh knew at their purchase that the bones had already been dated at 200-300 years. However Baugh later claimed that the bones were found in Cretaceous deposits."

One of Baugh's more famous claims, aside from the dinosaur tracks, is the London Hammer, an alleged out of place artifact of an "18th century miner's hammer" found in million-year-old Ordovician rock (he has also claimed it is in Cretaceous rock) found in 1934 from London, Texas. Baugh asserted this as evidence against scientifically known ways that rocks form. However, laboratory tests discounted his claim about the hammer's being formed in the rock. J.R. Cole wrote, "The stone concretion is real, and it looks impressive to someone unfamiliar with geological processes. How could a modern artifact be stuck in Ordovician rock? The answer is that the concretion itself is not Ordovician. Minerals in solution can harden around an intrusive object dropped in a crack or simply left on the ground if the source rock (in this case, reportedly Ordovician) is chemically soluble."

In July 2008, Baugh was in contact with Alvis Delk and James Bishop, who claimed to have found a dinosaur-human print fossil. Baugh bought the "fossil" from Delk who used the money to pay his medical bills. On the authenticity of the claims, reporter Bud Kennedy noted, "since no scientists were involved, about all we really know so far is that the museum has a new rock." This was deemed "not a convincing human footprint in ancient rock" by biologist Glen J. Kuban and called a "blatant fake" by biologist PZ Myers.

Creationist organizations such as Answers in Genesis have criticized Baugh's claims saying he "muddied the water for many Christians. . . . People are being misled." Don Batten, of Creation Ministries International wrote: "Some Christians will try to use Baugh's 'evidences' in witnessing and get 'shot down' by someone who is scientifically literate. The ones witnessed to will thereafter be wary of all creation evidences and even more inclined to dismiss Christians as nut cases not worth listening to." Answers in Genesis (AiG) lists the "Paluxy tracks" as arguments "we think creationists should NOT use" [emphasis in original]. Also Answers In Creation reviewed Baugh's museum and concluded "the main artifacts they claim show a young earth reveal that they are deceptions, and in many cases, not even clever ones."

In his 1992 book Panorama of Creation, Baugh claims that a layer of metallic hydrogen surrounded the early Earth. Furthermore, he professes that hexagonal water, or, "Creation water" as he calls it, is capable of healing. Such claims have been addressed by scientists as pseudoscience.

Baugh has claimed several college degrees, at one point professing to earning three doctorates, when no evidence exists that he even graduated from high school. These claimed doctorates are from unaccredited schools, two of which are widely considered "diploma mills". His claimed 1989 doctorate and master's degrees in archaeology come from the non-accredited Pacific International University, of which Baugh was also the president. His dissertation titled "Academic Justification for Voluntary Inclusion of Scientific Creation in Public Classroom Curricula, Supported by Evidence that Man and Dinosaurs Were Contemporary" was reviewed by Brett Vickers who criticized its "descriptions of his field-work on the Paluxy river 'man-tracks', speculation about Charles Darwin's religious beliefs and phobias, and biblical evidence of Adam's mental excellence." In 2005, Baugh claimed to have completed another doctorate in theology from the unaccredited Louisiana Baptist University. He also claimed to hold an honorary "Doctor of Philosophy in Theology" from the California Graduate School of Theology prior to its accreditation in 1991, but this claim has not been substantiated by the university.

== Bibliography ==
- Dinosaur Promise Publishing (paperback) — 1987, 152 pages, ISBN 0-939497-01-8
- Panorama of Creation Hearthstone Publishing, Ltd. (paperback) — 1992, 91 pages, ISBN 1-879366-01-0
- Jurassic Park: Fact Vs. Fiction (with Bill Uselton) Hearthstone Publishing, Ltd. (paperback) — 1993, 30 pages, ISBN 1-879366-35-5
- Footprints and the Stones of Time (with Clifford Wilson) Hearthstone Publishing, Ltd. (paperback) — 1994, 162 pages, ISBN 1-879366-17-7
- Why Do Men Believe Evolution Against All Odds? Hearthstone Publishing, Ltd. (hardcover) — 1999, 160 pages, ISBN 1-57558-049-7
