= Hindu views on evolution =

Some Hindus have found support for, or religious concepts foreshadowing evolutionary ideas in their scriptures, such as the mytheme of Dashavatara, where the incarnations of Vishnu starts with a fish. According to a 2009 Pew Research Centre report, Hindus were the second most religious group in America to support evolution as the best scientific explanation for life at rates of 80%, behind Buddhists who were the highest at 81%. In another 2014 survey, similar results were found for American Hindu acceptance of the theory of evolution.

In 2023, India removed references to evolution in textbooks and stopped teaching from 10th grade and below and was moved to 12th grade. In 2025, NCERT books also saw exclusion of Darwin's evolution theory.

== Reception in India ==
In India, there were minimal references to Darwinism in the 19th century. While elements of Victorian England opposed the idea of Darwinism, Hindus already had the present notion of common ancestry between humans and animals. While the creation–evolution controversy has seen much debate in US, Middle East and parts of Africa, it is an insignificant issue in India, because of its Hindu-majority population. Most Indian scientists accept biological evolution, and it is taught in Indian universities as a scientific fact.

However in 2023, India had removed references to evolution in textbooks and stopped teaching from 10th grade and below and was moved to 12th grade. This caused 4,500 scientists, teachers and other educators in the nation to sign a petition against the act, deeming the resolution a threat to the technology sector, and that it will discourage students from studying science. Prior in 2018, a similar incident had occurred which caused three major scientific bodies being the Indian National Science Academy (INSA), Indian Academy of Science (IASc) and National Academy of Sciences India (NASI) to issue a joint statement, explaining Darwin's theory is well established.

== Spiritual evolution ==
Many Hindu reformers compare the Samkhya philosophy, specifically the term parinama and the concept of evolutes, with Darwinism. David Lagourie Gosling has suggested that Swami Vivekananda based most of his cosmological and biological ideas on Samkhya. Influenced by western thought and esotericism, Vivekananda and Sri Aurobindo developed a view on reincarnation in which an involution of the Divine into matter takes place, and the person has to evolve over multiple lives until the Divine gains recognition of its true nature and liberation is attained.

== Hindu creationism ==
Hindu creationism, also known as Vedic creationism, is a type of religious old Earth creationism. Historian of science Ronald Numbers has commented that "Hindu Creationists have insisted on the antiquity of humans, who they believe appeared fully formed as long, perhaps, as trillions of years ago." The views of Hindu creationism are based on the Vedas, which depict an extreme antiquity of the universe and history of the Earth.

The emergence of modern Vedic creationism has been linked to Dayananda Saraswati, the founder of Arya Samaj. In his Satyarth Prakash, Saraswati promoted anti-evolutionary views and took a literal reading of the Vedas. He argued that God designed the physical bodies of all species 1.96 billions years ago on Earth and on other planets at the beginning of the present cosmic cycle. He stated that God conjoined the bodies with pre-existing souls and that different species were created and distributed to souls in accord to their karma from the previous cosmic cycle. Saraswati in a public lecture condemned Darwinian evolution but misunderstood common descent by questioning why monkeys no longer evolve into men.

Vedic creationism holds a view of the world derived largely from the Bhagavad Gita. It was promoted by A. C. Bhaktivedanta Swami Prabhupada the founder of ISKCON who referred to Charles Darwin and his followers as "rascals". Vedic creationism was also promoted by ISKCON devotees Michael Cremo and Richard L. Thompson, authors of the 1993 book Forbidden Archeology. They argue that human beings are distinct species that have existed for billions of years. Vedic creationists are known to search for anomalies and reinterpret the fossil record to make it fit with their metaphysical assumptions.

=== Vanara ===
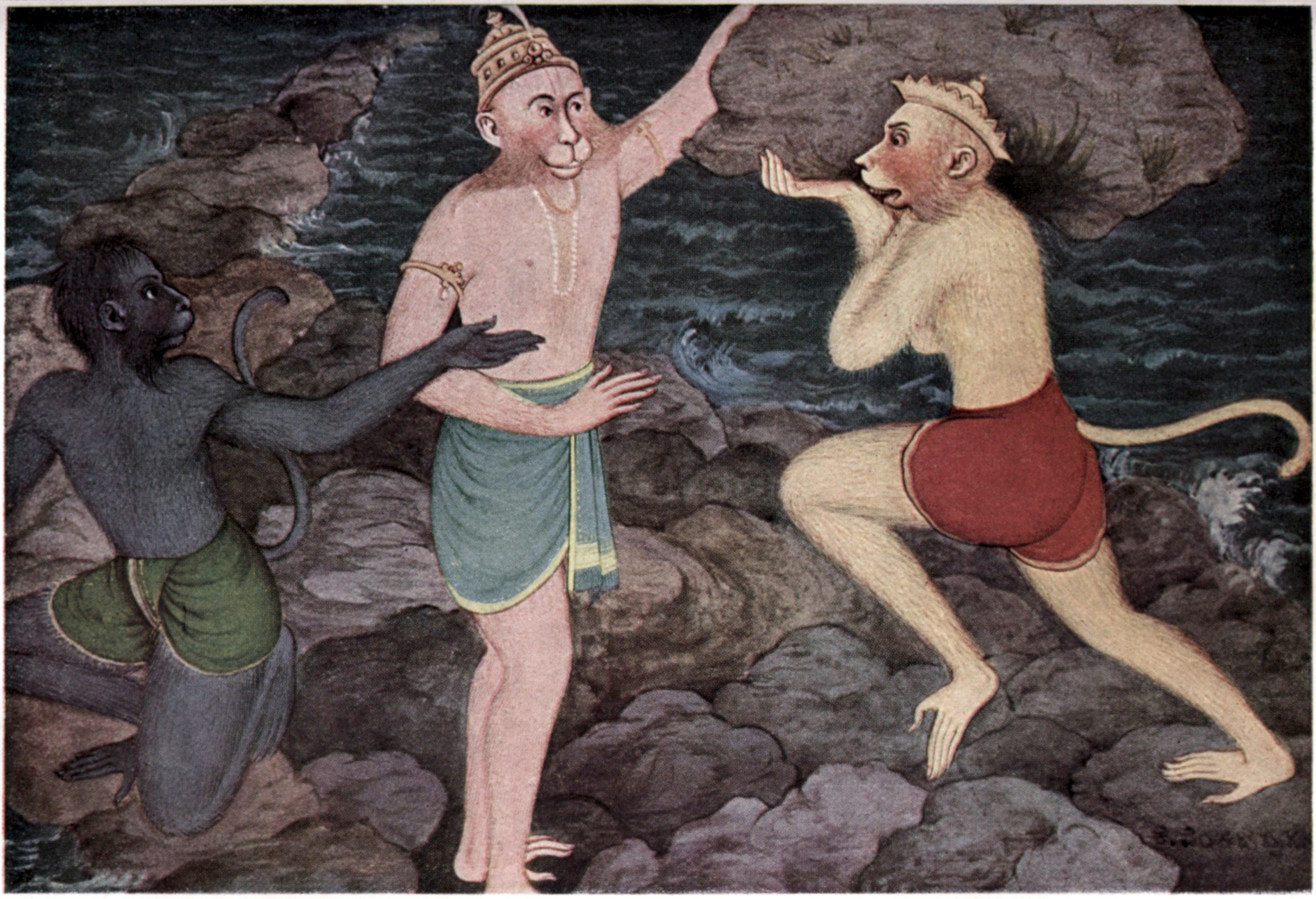
The Hindu epics mention an ape-like humanoid species called the vanaras.

The Sanskrit epics of the Hindus mention several exotic creatures including ape-like humanoids. The Ramayana speaks of the Vanaras, an ape-like species (ape-men) with human intelligence, that existed millions of years ago alongside modern humans. Michael Cremo, a Hindu creationist, states:

The idea of ape-men is not something that was invented by Darwinists of the nineteenth century. Long before that, the ancient Sanskrit writings were speaking of creatures with apelike bodies, humanlike intelligence, and a low level of material culture. For example, the Ramayana speaks of the Vanaras, a species of apelike men that existed millions of years ago. But alongside these ape-men existed humans of our type. The relationship was one of coexistence rather than evolution.

== Dashavatara ==
The order of the Dashavatara (ten principal avatars of the god Vishnu) is interpreted to convey Darwin's evolution. British geneticist and evolutionary biologist J. B. S. Haldane opined that they are a true sequential depiction of the great unfolding of evolution. According to them, like the evolutionary process itself, the first avatar of God is a fish - Matsya, which depicts aquatic life, then comes the aquatic reptile turtle, Kurma, which depicts creatures moving to land, then a mammal - the boar Varaha, then Narasimha, a man-lion being, which is sometimes taken to mean creatures like Okapi, Archaeopteryx, and others, then comes Vamana, the dwarf hominid. Then Parashurama depicts humans when they were in the caveman stage. And then, Rama depicts the rise of civilization and kingdoms. (Sometimes, when Balarama is taken into account, he is taken to represent the growth of agriculture.) Krishna is taken to symbolize the growth of art and crafts. The tenth avatar Kalki is believed to appear in the future, prophesied to end the present age of the Kali Yuga.

== See also ==
- Creation myth
- Epic-Puranic chronology
- Hindutva pseudohistory
- Ichthys
- Relationship between religion and science
- NCERT textbook controversies
- Vedic science

== Sources ==
- Gosling, David (June 2011). "Darwin and the Hindu Tradition: Does What Goes Around Come Around?". Zygon. 46 (2): 345–347–348–353. doi:10.1111/j.1467-9744.2010.01177.x.
- Mackenzie Brown, C., ed. (2020), Asian Religious Responses to Darwinism: Evolutionary Theories in Middle Eastern, South Asian, and East Asian Cultural Contexts, Springer Nature
