= Meister Print =

Alleged out-of-place artifact from Utah

The Meister Print (also known as the Meister Footprint) refers to two trilobites in slate that appeared to be crushed in a human shoe print. The print was cited by creationists and pseudoscience advocates as an out-of-place artifact, but was debunked by palaeontologists as the result of a natural geologic process known as spall formation.

In 1968, William Meister was searching for trilobite fossils in 500-million-year-old strata known as the Cambrian Wheeler Formation near Antelope Springs, Utah. He discovered what looked like a human shoe print with a trilobite under its heel after breaking open a slab. The supposed footprint was used by Melvin A. Cook as evidence against evolution in an article he wrote in 1970. Cook was not a paleontologist and his conclusion was criticized by experts. Upon investigation the print showed none of the criteria by which genuine prints can be recognized, and the shape could best be explained by natural geological processes.

According to Brian Regal "several studies showed the print was, in reality, an example of a common geologic occurrence known as spalling, in which slabs of rock break away from each other in distinctive patterns. This particular case of spalling had created a simulacrum vaguely suggestive of a shoe print."

== See also ==
- Moab Man
