= David Lagourie Gosling =

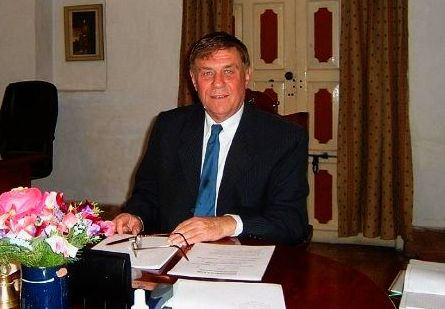
David L Gosling

David L. Gosling is a British academic who is a supervisor in the University of Cambridge. He trained in nuclear physics and has held positions in the universities of Hull, Delhi (St. Stephen’s College), the East-West Center in Hawaii, and at the World Council of Churches in Geneva, where he was director of Church and Society.

From 2006-10 he was principal of Edwardes College in the University of Peshawar; he has taught in the Faculty of Education in the University of Cambridge, where he was also Spalding Fellow at Clare Hall College, Cambridge.

He is a chartered physicist (C Phys), a Fellow of the Royal Asiatic Society (FRAS), a Fellow of the International Society for Science and Religion (FISSR) and has published on ecological and scientific issues in south Asia, and on nuclear power. He was science consultant for the BBC Two Natural History series “Wonders of the Monsoon”.

== Select publications ==
- Gosling, David (1977). Nuclear Crisis: A Question of Breeding. Prism. ISBN 9780904727579.
- Gosling, David (2001). Religion and Ecology in India and Southeast Asia. Routledge. ISBN 9781134551774.
- Gosling, David (2007). 'Science and the Indian Tradition: When Einstein met Tagore. Routledge. ISBN 9781134143337.
- Gosling, David (2016). "India's response to Darwin". In Fehige, Yiftach (ed.). Science and Religion. Routledge. doi:10.4324/9781315659831. ISBN 9781317335245.
- Gosling, David (2016). Frontier of Fear: Confronting the Taliban on Pakistan's Border. Routledge. ISBN 9781784534684.
- Gosling, David (2011). "Pakistan's role in securing a permanent Afghan peace". Archived from the original on July 9, 2019.
- Gosling, David (2020). Science and Development in Thai and South Asian Buddhism. Routledge. ISBN 9780429626845.
