= London Hammer =

Hammer found in London, Texas, in 1936

- London Hammer in 1986
- Material: Iron, wood
- Length: 6 in (15 cm)
- Width: 1 in (25 mm)
- Discovered: 1936; London, Texas; 32.23028°N 97.8053°W
- Discovered by: Max Hahn
- Present location: Creation Evidence Museum

The London Hammer (also known as the "London Artifact") is a hammer made of iron and wood that was found in London, Texas in 1936. Part of the hammer is embedded in a limey rock concretion, leading some to regard it as an anomalous artifact. The tool is identical to late 19th-century mining hammers; one theory for its encasement in rock is that a deposit of highly soluble travertine may have formed and hardened around it within a relatively short time.

== History ==
The hammer was purportedly found by a local couple, Max Hahn and Emma Zadie Hahn, while out walking along the course of the Red Creek near the town of London. They spotted a curious piece of loose rock with a bit of wood embedded in it and took it home with them. A decade later, their son Max broke open the rock to find the concealed hammerhead within.

The metal hammerhead is approximately 6 inches (15 centimeters) long and has a diameter of 1 in (25 mm), leading some to suggest that the hammer was not used for large projects, but rather for fine work or soft metal. The metal of the hammerhead consists of 96.6% iron, 2.6% chlorine, and 0.74% sulfur.

The hammer began to attract wider attention after it was bought in 1983 by the creationist Carl Baugh, who claimed the artifact was a "monumental 'pre-Flood' discovery." He has used it as the basis of speculation of how the atmospheric quality of an antediluvian Earth could have encouraged the growth of giants. Baugh's Creation Evidence Museum purchased the hammer around 1983 and began to promote it as "the London Artifact".

Other observers have noted that the hammer is stylistically consistent with typical American tools manufactured in the region in the late 19th century. Its design is consistent with a miner's hammer. One possible explanation for the rock containing the artifact is that the highly soluble minerals in the ancient limestone may have formed a concretion around the object via a common process (like that of a petrifying well) which often creates similar encrustations around fossils and other nuclei in a relatively short time.
