= Roland T. Bird =

American paleontologist (1899–1978)

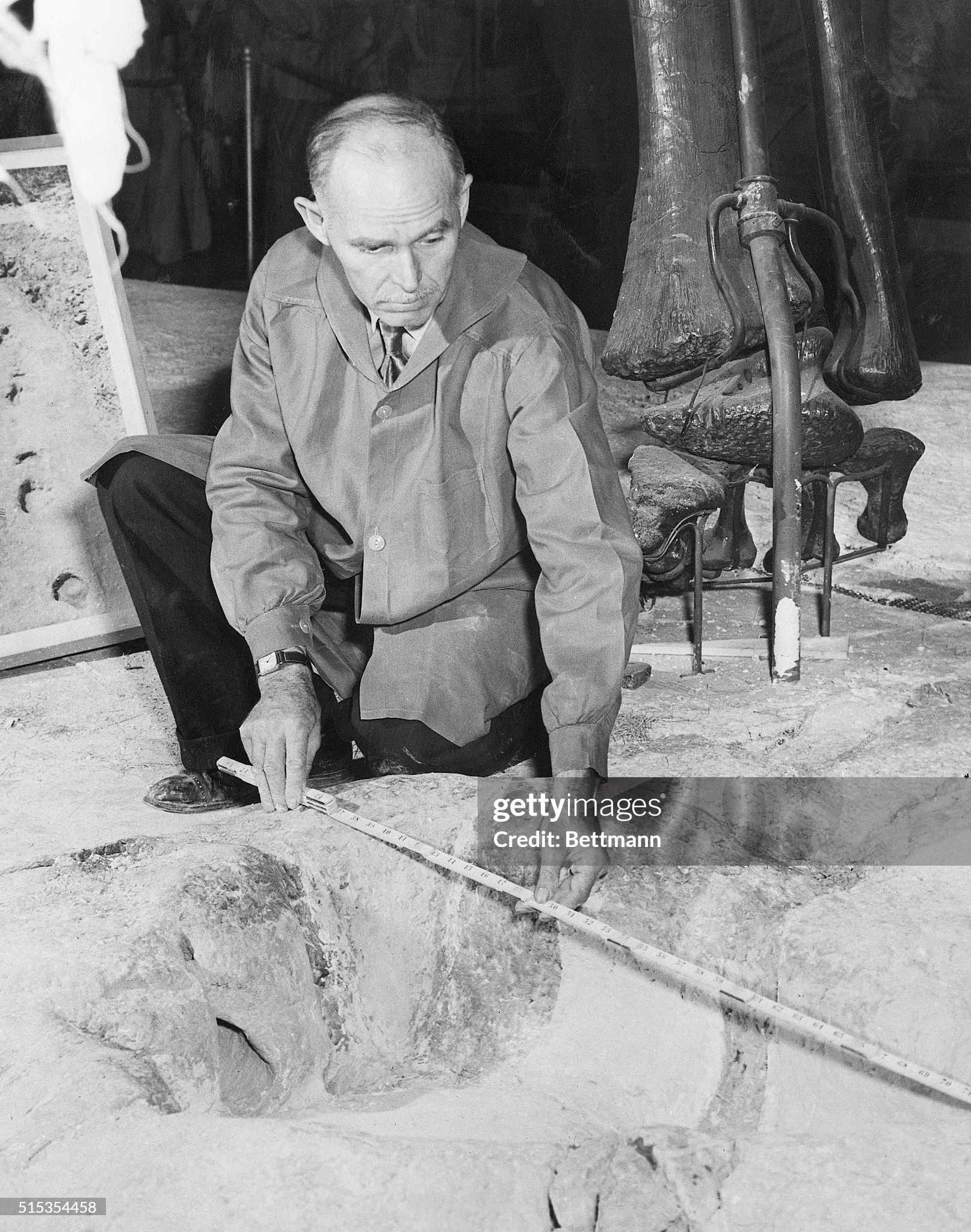
Bird measuring a Brontosaurus impression in 1952

Roland Thaxter Bird (December 29, 1899 – January 24, 1978) was an American palaeontologist. He is best known for his discovery of fossil trackways, including the first scientifically documented sauropod tracks, in the Glen Rose Formation near the Paluxy River in Texas, an area later designated the Dinosaur Valley State Park, and for his work with the American Museum of Natural History.

== Early life ==
Bird was born on December 29, 1899, in Rye, New York. When he was 14, a respiratory condition forced him to drop out of high school, and after his mother died of tuberculosis, a doctor advised him to move to his uncle's farm. In the 1920s and 1930s, he struggled financially due to the Great Depression and traveled throughout the United States on a Harley-Davidson motorcycle working odd jobs, including as a cowboy in Florida.

== Paleontology career ==
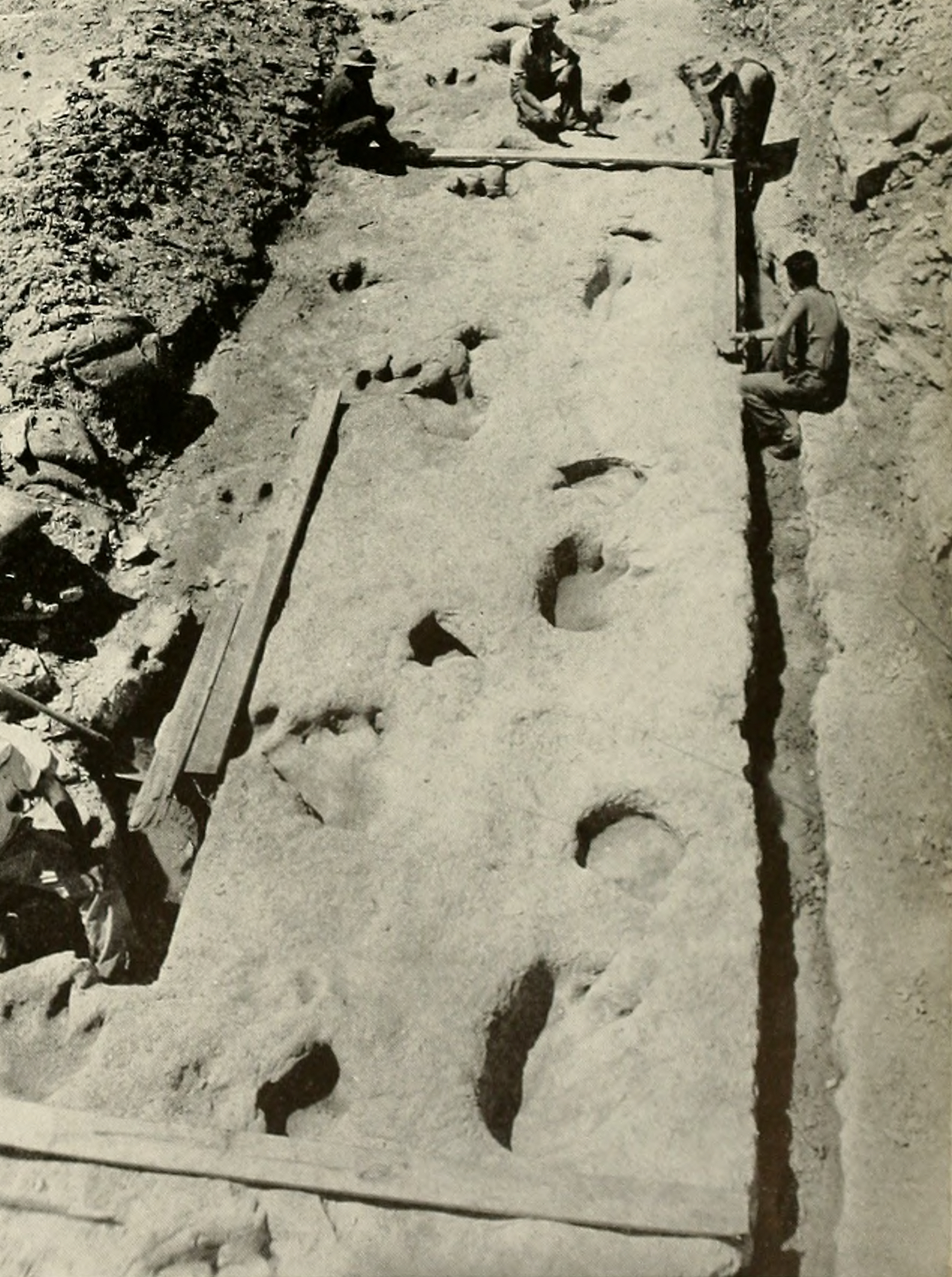
Workers preparing a slab with tracks formed by a Sauropod and another dinosaur for removal from the Paluxy River Basin

Bird discovered one of his first fossils, the skull of an amphibian, in 1932 while camping in Arizona. He sent the skull to his father, an amateur entomologist, who passed it along to Barnum Brown, then a curator of vertebrate paleontology at the American Museum of Natural History. The specimen was a previously undiscovered genus and species, which would later be named Stanocephalosaurus birdi, and the discovery led to Bird's employment at the Museum in 1934, where he worked as a fossil collector for Brown. Bird first learned of possible dinosaur tracks in the area of Glen Rose, Texas, in 1938 from locals in Gallup, New Mexico, and in 1940 he worked alongside crews from the Works Progress Administration to excavate dozens of sauropod and theropod tracks from the Paluxy River Basin. Parts of the excavated trackway were sent to the Texas Memorial Museum, as well as the AMNH.

== Additional reading ==
- Roland T. Bird, V. Theodore Schreiber: Bones for Barnum Brown: Adventures of a Dinosaur Hunter, 1985, ISBN 978-0-87565-007-4
