= Richard L. Thompson =

American mathematician and religious figure

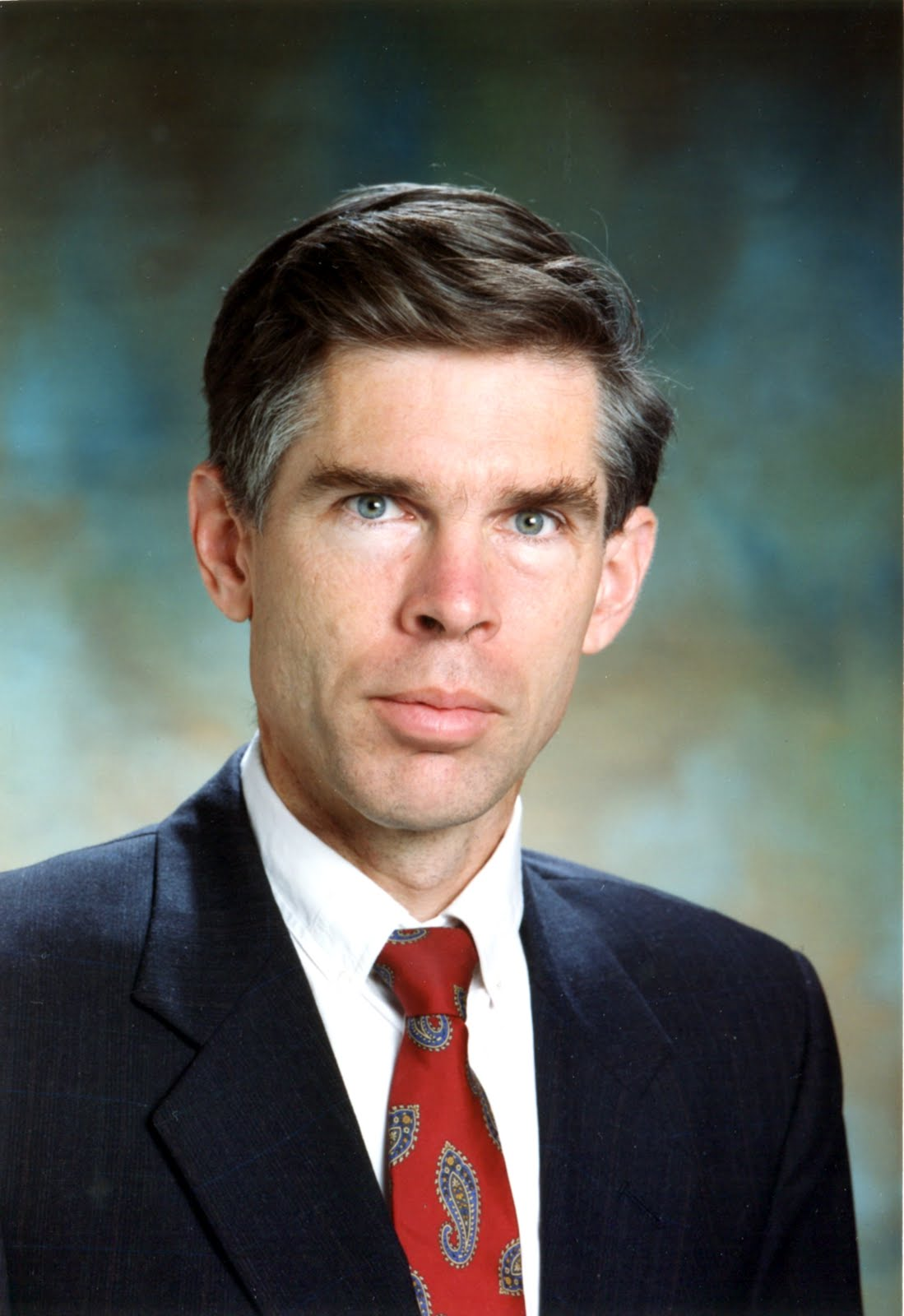
- Born: Richard Leslie Thompson; February 4, 1947; Binghamton, New York, U.S.
- Died: September 18, 2008 (aged 61); Gainesville, Florida, U.S.
- Education: Cornell University

Richard Leslie Thompson, also known as Sadaputa Dasa (IAST: Sadāpūta Dāsa; February 4, 1947 – September 18, 2008), was an American mathematician, author and Gaudiya Vaishnava religious figure. Historian Meera Nanda described him as a driving intellectual force of 'Vedic creationism' as co-author (with Michael Cremo) of Forbidden Archeology: The Hidden History of the Human Race (1993), a work that has attracted significant criticism from the scientific community. Thompson also published several books and articles on the relationship between religion and science, Hindu cosmology and astronomy. He was a member of the International Society for Krishna Consciousness (popularly known as the Hare Krishna movement or ISKCON) and a founding member of the Bhaktivedanta Institute dedicated to examining the relationship of modern scientific theories to the Vaishnava worldview. In the 'science and religion' community he was known for his articulation of ISKCON's view of science. Danish historian of religion Mikael Rothstein described Thompson as "the single dominating writer on science" in ISKCON whom ISKCON has chosen to "cover the field of science more or less on his own". C. Mackenzie Brown, professor of religion at Trinity University, San Antonio, Texas, described him as "the leading figure" in ISKCON's critique of modern science.

== Biography ==
Richard L. Thompson was born in Binghamton, New York, in 1947. In 1974 he received a Ph.D. in mathematics from Cornell University. In the same year he formally became a member of ISKCON, receiving spiritual initiation from ISKCON's founder, A. C. Bhaktivedanta Swami Prabhupada, and adopting the spiritual name Sadaputa Dasa. Thompson carried out research in the fields of statistical mechanics, probability theory, and mathematical biology. He published scholarly articles in refereed journals and series, such as Journal of the International Association for Mathematical Geology, Remote Sensing of Environment, Biosystems, and International Review of Cytology. In 1976 he became a founding member of the Bhaktivedanta Institute, the scientific branch of ISKCON dedicated to examining the relationship of modern scientific theories to Swami Prabhupada’s Vaishnava worldview. Soon after joining ISKCON, Thompson became "ISKCON's dominating figure in science" and "established himself as the leading figure in the movement's critique of modern science in the light of Vedic spiritual (or 'higher-dimensional') science." He formulated ISKCON's view on the concept of "higher-dimensional science" and wrote extensively on scientific subjects from this perspective. In support of ISKCON's theology, he made research and analysis of the relation between the Vaishnava theological worldview and modern science.

Thompson died of a heart attack on September 18, 2008.

== Forbidden Archeology ==
The coauthor Michael Cremo writes in the Preface to the first edition that the work's central claim, that anomalous paleontological evidence dating in many hundreds of thousands of years, with examples such as the Laetoli footprints (generally considered by paleontologists to have been made by bipedal hominins) potentially stretching possibilities toward the low millions, suggests that modern human beings "perhaps ... coexisted with more apelike creatures." It also contends that the scientific establishment, influenced by confirmation bias, has suppressed fossil evidence of extreme human antiquity. These arguments has been criticized by mainstream scholars from a variety of disciplines.

== Selected bibliography ==
=== Books ===
- Thompson, Richard L. (1974). Equilibrium States of Thin Energy Shells. Providence, RI: American Mathematical Society. ISBN 978-0-8218-1850-3.
- Thompson, Richard L. (1981). Mechanistic and Nonmechanistic Science: An Investigation Into the Nature of Consciousness and Form. Lynbrook, NY: Bala Books. ISBN 978-0-89647-014-9.
- Goel, Narendra S.; Thompson, Richard L. (1988). Computer Simulations of Self-Organizations in Biological Systems. London: Croom Helm. ISBN 978-0-02-947922-3.
- Thompson, Richard L. (1989). Vedic Cosmography and Astronomy. Los Angeles: Bhaktivedanta Book Trust. ISBN 978-0892132690.
- Cremo, Michael A.; Thompson, Richard L. (1993). Forbidden Archeology: The Hidden History of the Human Race. San Diego: Bhaktivedanta Institute. ISBN 978-0-9635309-8-1.
- Thompson, Richard L. (1995). Alien Identities: Ancient Insights into Modern UFO Phenomena, 2nd Edition. Alachua, FL: Govardhan Hill Publishing. ISBN 978-0-9635309-4-3.
- Thompson, Richard L. (2003). Maya: The World as Virtual Reality. Alachua, FL: Govardhan Hill Publishing. ISBN 978-0-9635309-0-5.
- Thompson, Richard L. (2006). The Cosmology of the Bhagavata Purana: Mysteries of the Sacred Universe. Delhi: Motilal Banarsidass. ISBN 978-8120819191.
- Thompson, Richard L. (2007). God and Science: Divine Causation and the Laws of Nature. Delhi: Motilal Banarsidass. ISBN 978-81-208-3254-1.

=== Papers and other professional works ===
- Thompson, Richard (1980). "A Measure of Shared Information in Classes of Patterns". Pattern Recognition. 12 (6): 369–379. Bibcode:1980PatRe..12..369T. doi:10.1016/0031-3203(80)90013-8.
- Thompson, Richard (1984). "A Stochastic Model of Sedimentation". Journal of the International Association for Mathematical Geology. 16 (8): 753–778. Bibcode:1984MatG...16..753T. doi:10.1007/bf01036703. S2CID 122598216.
- Thompson, Richard L.; Narendra S. Goel (1985). "A Simulation of T4 Bacteriophage Assembly and Operation". Biosystems. 18 (1): 23–45. Bibcode:1985BiSys..18...23T. doi:10.1016/0303-2647(85)90058-9. PMID 3840704.
- Thompson, Richard L.; Narendra S. Goel (1988). "Movable Finite Automata (MFA) Models for Biological Systems I: Bacteriophage Assembly and Operation". Journal of Theoretical Biology. 131 (3): 351–385. Bibcode:1988JThBi.131..351T. doi:10.1016/s0022-5193(88)80230-3. PMID 3193776.
- Goel, Narendra S.; Richard Thompson (1989). "Movable Finite Automata (MFA): A New Tool for Computer Modeling of Living Systems". Artificial Life: The Proceedings of an Interdisciplinary Workshop on the Synthesis and Simulation of Living Systems, Held September, 1987, in los Alamos, New Mexico, Edited by Christopher Langton: 317–340. ISBN 978-0-201-09346-9.
- Thompson, Richard; Narendra S. Goel (1990). "Biological Automata Models and Evolution II: The evolution of macromolecular machinery". Organizational Constraints on the Dynamics of Evolution, Edited by John Maynard Smith and G. Vida: 33–48. ISBN 978-0-7190-2670-6.
- Thompson, Richard L.; Narendra S. Goel (1998). "Two Models for Rapidly Calculation Bi-direction Reflectance of Complex Vegetation Scenes: Photon Spread (PS) Model and Statistical Photon Spread (SPS) Model". Remote Sensing Reviews. 16 (3): 157–207. doi:10.1080/02757259809532351.

== See also ==
- Hindu views on evolution
- Quantum mysticism
