= Glen Kuban =

American computer programmer and independent investigator

Glen Jay Kuban (born 1957) is an American computer programmer and independent investigator from Brunswick, Ohio. He is known for his work in Paluxy River dinosaur footprints.

Kuban became interested in studying dinosaur footprints in 1980 when he began studying the Paluxy River prints, which he had expected to be human. After studying these prints and conducting field work on them he confirmed the results of an earlier study by creation scientists from Loma Linda University that they appeared to be dinosaurian, not human. One reason he reached this conclusion was that the prints had shallow indentations that corresponded to dinosaurian toes, not human ones, and detailed analysis of the distinctive colorations in each purportedly human print revealed these prints to be dinosaurian. After cleaning and mapping the trails during his field work there, he tried, unsuccessfully, to convince certain creationists to look at them. After carefully studying the tracks, he determined that all of the purportedly human prints there were actually dinosaurian, writing, "I have concluded that no genuine human tracks have been found in the Paluxy riverbed." Kuban was the first to identify the larger imprint as the impression of the metatarsal bones.
