= Forbidden Archeology =

1993 book by Michael Cremo and Richard L. Thompson

Forbidden Archeology: The Hidden History of the Human Race
- Authors: Michael Cremo; Richard L. Thompson
- Language: English
- Subject: History
- Published: 1993
- Publication place: United States
- Media type: Print
- Pages: 914
- ISBN: 978-0892132942

Forbidden Archeology: The Hidden History of the Human Race is a 1993 pseudoarchaeological book by Michael Cremo and Richard L. Thompson, written in association with the Bhaktivedanta Institute of ISKCON. Cremo states that the book has "over 900 pages of well-documented evidence suggesting that modern man did not evolve from ape man, but instead has co-existed with apes for millions of years!", and that the scientific establishment has suppressed the fossil evidence of extreme human antiquity. Cremo identifies as a "Vedic archeologist", since he believes his findings support the story of humanity described in the Vedas. He says a knowledge filter (confirmation bias) is the cause of the supposed suppression.

The book has attracted attention from some mainstream scholars as well as Hindu creationists and paranormalists. Scholars of mainstream archaeology and paleoanthropology have described it as pseudoscience.

== Academic analysis ==
In a twenty-page review in Social Studies of Science, Jo Wodak and David Oldroyd describe the book's argument: Early paleoanthropologists, in the late nineteenth century and early twentieth, interpreted much empirical information as evidence favoring the existence of human beings in the Tertiary period (about 65.5 million to 2.6 million years ago). But starting from about the 1930s, paleoanthropologists turned to the view that human beings first evolved in the next era, the Pleistocene (2.6 million to 11,700 years ago). The older evidence, Cremo and Thompson say, was never shown bad; it was just reinterpreted in such a way as to rule out tertiary humans. So what Cremo and Thompson have done is "comb the early literature in great—indeed impressive—detail" and argue, on the basis of their historical study, "that the old arguments were never satisfactorily disproved and should be reconsidered with open minds".

Ultimately, the book questions the Darwinian evolutionary assumptions underlying modern paleoanthropology.

Anthropologist Colin Groves states that 19th-century finds were generally "found by accident and by amateurs", and were thus generally lacking proper documentation of crucial contextual information, and that the dates assigned were therefore suspect. Cremo and Thompson fail to take account of this, he says, and seem to want to accord equal value to all finds. Groves also states that their discussion of radiometric dating fails to take account of the ongoing refinement of these methods, and the resulting fact that later results are more reliable than earlier ones. He concludes that the book is only "superficially scholarly".

Reviewing the book in the French journal L'anthropologie, paleontologist Marylène Patou-Mathis wrote that the book is "a provocative work that raises the problem of the influence of the dominant ideas of a time period on scientific research. These ideas can compel researchers to publish their analyses according to the conceptions permitted by the scientific community." The evidence Cremo and Thompson bring forward for the very ancient origin of humanity, she wrote, "isn't always convincing (far from it)," but "the documentary richness of this work, more sociological than scientific, isn't to be overlooked."

Different reviewers (for example, Feder and Wodak) compared the book to works by Christian creationists. Writing in the British Journal for the History of Science, Tim Murray wrote, "This is a piece of 'Creation Science,' which, while not based on a need to present a Christian alternative, manifests many of the same types of argument," including accusing opponents of unscientifically trying to defend their biases, alleging they are acting conspiratorially, and explaining "the currently marginal position of your alternative as being the result of prejudice, conspiracy and manipulation rather than of any fault of the theory itself." Murray is head of the archaeology department at La Trobe University in Melbourne, Australia.

Writing in Geoarchaeology, anthropologist Kenneth L. Feder said, "While decidedly antievolutionary in perspective, this work is not the ordinary variety of antievolutionism in form, content, or style. In distinction to the usual brand of such writing, the authors use original sources and the book is well written. Further, the overall tone of the work is far superior to that exhibited in ordinary creationist literature. Nonetheless, I suspect that creationism is at the root of the authors' argument, albeit of a sort not commonly seen before."

Other reviewers also wrote of the book as being doctrinally motivated. Murray wrote that "far from being a disinterested analysis", Forbidden Archeology "is designed to demolish the case for biological and chemical evolution and to advance the case for a Vedic alternative". Wodak and Oldroyd wrote that although the authors don't directly come out with a Vedic alternative, "the evidence is construed in the silent light of Vedic metaphysics."

Some reviewers (Feder and Wodak & Oldryod) have faulted the book for attacking the current picture of human evolution but not offering an alternative paradigm. The book's authors "openly acknowledge the Vedic inspiration of their research" and make what Feder calls the "reasonable request" that the Vedic derivation of their theoretical outlook not disqualify it. But, Feder says, "When you attempt to deconstruct a well-accepted paradigm, it is reasonable to expect that a new paradigm be suggested in its place." The book doesn't do this, instead promising that the paradigm will appear in a forthcoming volume (Wodak & Oldryod). But this, Wodak & Oldryod say, is not of much help to the readers of Forbidden Archeology.

Feder suggests that the authors left their paradigm out of the book because of an ulterior motive: "Wishing to appear entirely scientific, the authors hoped to avoid a detailed discussion of their own beliefs [...] since, I would contend, these are based on a creationist view, but not the kind we are all familiar with [...] Like fundamentalist Christian creationists, they avoid talking about the religious content of their perspective." In 2003, Cremo, writing alone, published the book detailing the Vedic paradigm, Human Devolution (2003). "The reasons for its late appearance", Cremo wrote in the Introduction, "have more to do with the time it takes to research and write such a book rather than any desire to avoid a detailed discussion of a Vedic alternative to Darwinism".

Several reviewers (Murray, Feder, Wodak, & Oldryod) say that Forbidden Archeology proposes a "conspiracy theory" and argue that science in general and paleoanthropology in particular are more open than the book's authors would have us believe: "[Dissenting] voices in the literature evidences the fact that there is not some conspiratorial 'cover-up' in palaeoanthropology."

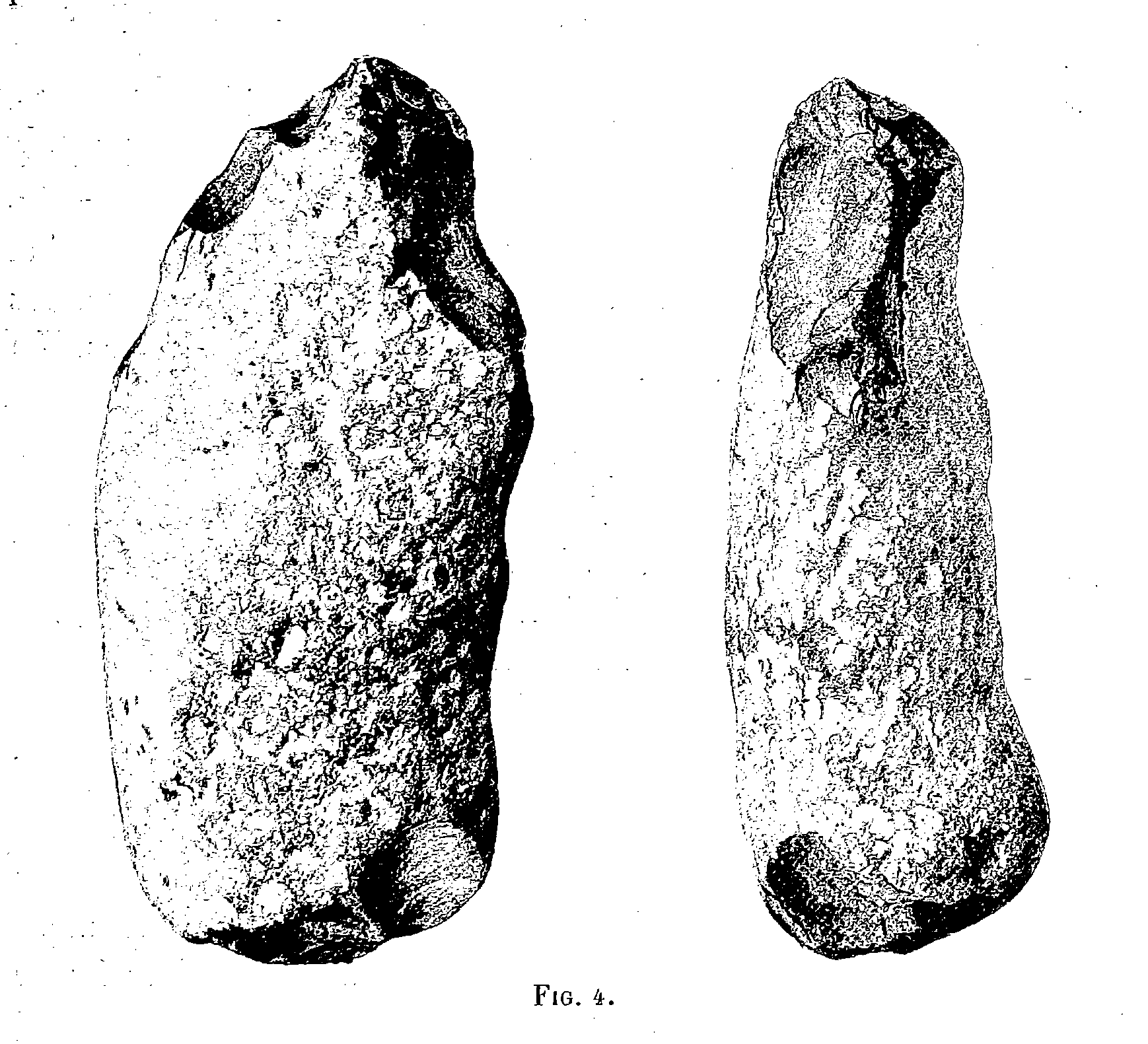
The book's interpretation of eoliths (example pictured) has been criticized.

Feder, in his review, notes that neither Thompson nor Cremo is an archaeologist or paleoanthropologist. He says they fail to give due credit to the advances in technique that distinguish science in recent times from that of the nineteenth century. And he brings forward various objections to their analysis of eoliths, stone artifacts sometimes regarded as tools.

Wodak and Oldryod also criticize the book's discussion of eoliths. Moreover, they say, although granting the book's theory that anatomically modern humans co-existed with more primitive forms would certainly alter our current thinking about human history, it would not invalidate orthodox evolutionary theory.

The book is more than 900 pages long. "[T]he authors go in for overkill in terms of swamping the reader with detail—a strategy which may persuade readers who lack access to the relevant sources and [have] no special expertise in paleoanthropology, and are therefore likely to assume that such a thorough exposition of the historical terrain must signify accuracy and equity".

Wodak & Oldryod say that Forbidden Archeology is "one-sided" because, despite its great length, it does not discuss evidence favorable to the evolutionary model of human origins, nor the work of recent paleoanthropologists.

Murray wrote, "I have no doubt that there will be some who will read this book and profit from it. Certainly it provides the historian of archaeology with a useful compendium of case studies in the history and sociology of scientific knowledge, which can be used to foster debate within archaeology about how to describe the epistemology of one's discipline. On another level the book joins others from creation science and New Age philosophy as a body of works which seek to address members of a public alienated from science, either because it has become so arcane or because it has ceased to suit some in search of meaning in their lives."

== Further writings and impact ==
Cremo continued the theme of Forbidden Archeology in his later books, such as in Forbidden Archeology's Impact (1998). His book Human Devolution (2003), like Forbidden Archeology, claims that man has existed for millions of years, attempts to prove this by citing, as Meera Nanda puts it, "every possible research into the paranormal ever conducted anywhere to 'prove' the truth of holist Vedic cosmology which proposes the presence of a spiritual element in all matter (which takes different forms, thereby explaining the theory of 'devolution')."

The Indian magazine Frontline called Cremo and Thompson "the intellectual force driving Vedic creationism in America".

=== The Mysterious Origins of Man ===
In 1996, Thompson and Cremo appeared on the NBC special The Mysterious Origins of Man, which was based upon the book and which was similarly criticized by the scientific community.
