= Michael Cremo =

American Vedic creationist (1948–2026)

Michael A. Cremo
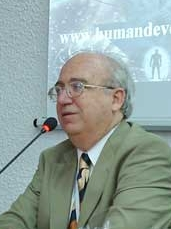
- Cremo in 2003
- Born: July 15, 1948; Schenectady, New York, U.S.
- Died: October 14, 2026 (aged 78); Los Angeles, California, U.S.
- Education: George Washington University
- Occupations: Author, editor
- Website: www.MCremo.com

Michael A. Cremo (July 15, 1948 – October 14, 2026), also known by his devotional name Drutakarmā dāsa, was an American independent researcher who described himself as a Vedic creationist and an "alternative archeologist". He argued that humans have lived on Earth for millions of years. Based on artifacts allegedly found in the Eocene auriferous gravels of Table Mountain, California, and discussed in his book Forbidden Archeology, Cremo argued for the existence of modern humans on Earth as early as 30 to 40 million years ago. Forbidden Archeology, which he wrote with Richard L. Thompson, has attracted criticism from mainstream scholars, who describe it as pseudoscientific.

== Early life and education ==
Cremo was born in Schenectady, New York on July 15, 1948. His father, Salvatore Cremo, was a United States military intelligence officer. Michael Cremo lived with his family in Germany, where he went to high school. They spent several summers traveling throughout Europe. He attended George Washington University from 1966 to 1968, then served in the United States Navy.

== Religious views ==
Cremo was a member of the International Society for Krishna Consciousness (ISKCON) and the Bhaktivedanta Institute. He wrote several books and articles about Hindu spirituality using the pen-name Drutakarmā dāsa. He had also been a contributing editor to the magazine Back to Godhead and a bhakti yoga teacher. Cremo told Contemporary Authors that he decided to devote his life to Krishna in the early 1970s, after receiving a copy of the Bhagavad Gita at a Grateful Dead concert. At the end of the 1990s he authored a paper on the official ISKCON statement on capital punishment. His work on "Puranic Time and the Archaeological Record" was published in ISKCON Communications Journal and Time and Archaeology.

== Forbidden Archeology ==
Cremo's central claim in Forbidden Archeology is that humans have lived on Earth for tens to hundreds of millions of years, and that the scientific establishment has suppressed the fossil evidence of extreme human antiquity. In the case of grooved spheres from pyrophyllite mines of Ottosdal, South Africa, Cremo proposed that they might be man-made artifacts, possibly as far back as 2.8 billion years ago. Forbidden Archeology has been criticized by mainstream scholars from a variety of disciplines.

== Later years and death ==
In his final years, Cremo organized a number of conferences at which ISKCON-associated academics would exchange views and experiences. In March 2009, Cremo appeared in a History Channel television series called Ancient Aliens, and in 2010 in a mini series of the same name.

Cremo died at a hospital in Los Angeles, California, on October 14, 2026, at the age of 78.

== Publications ==
- Thompson, Richard L.; Cremo, Michael A. (1993). Forbidden archeology : the hidden history of the human race (1st ed.). San Diego: Bhaktivedanta Institute. ISBN 9780963530981.
- Cremo, M A. (1999) "Puranic Time and the Archeological Record". In Tim Murray, ed. Time and Archaeology, Routledge, London,
- Cremo, M. A. (2002) "The Later Discoveries of Boucher de Perthes at Moulin Quignon and Their Impact on the Moulin Quignon Jaw Controversy". In Goulven Laurent ed. Proceedings of the XXth International Congress of History of Science (Liege, 20–26 July 1997), Volume X, Earth Sciences, Geography and Cartography. Turnhout, Belgium: Brepols, pp. 39–56
- Cremo, M. A. (2009) "The discoveries of Carlos Ribeiro: a controversial episode in nineteenth-century European archeology", Journal of Iberian Archaeology, vol. 12: 69–89.
- Cremo, M. A. (2008) "Excavating the eternal: an indigenous archaeological tradition in India", Antiquity, 82:178-188.
- Cremo, M. A. (2008) "Some Angles on the Anglo Debate", Archaeologies: Journal of the World Archaeological Congress, 4(1): 164–167.

== See also ==
- Gaudiya Vaishnavism
- Creationism
