= Malone Mountains =

Mountains in Texas, United States

Highest point
- Elevation: 5,062 ft (1,543 m)
- Coordinates: 31.2344°N 105.5641°W

Geography
- Location: Texas

The Malone Mountains are a small mountain chain located in West Texas, 10 miles west of Sierra Blanca. The tallest peak in the chain stands 5,062 feet above sea level. The mountains extend for 6 miles to the northwest.

The mountains are known to be one of the only sites with Jurassic age fossils in Texas.
