= London, Texas =

Unincorporated community in Texas, US

- Unincorporated community
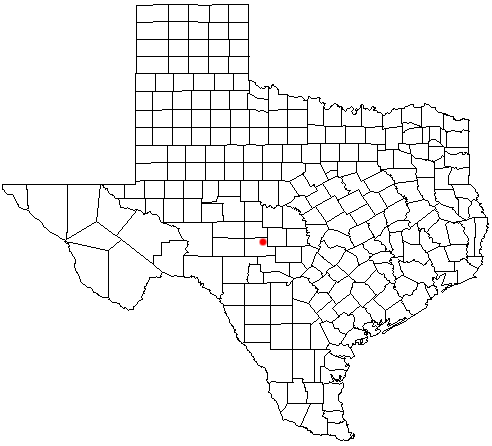
- Coordinates: 30°40′37″N 99°34′35″W
- Country: United States
- State: Texas
- County: Kimble
- Elevation: 1,703 ft (519 m)
- Time zone: UTC-6 (Central (CST))
  - Summer (DST): UTC-5 (CDT)
- Area code: 325
- FIPS code: 48-43540
- GNIS feature ID: 1361636

London is an unincorporated community in northeastern Kimble County, Texas, United States. According to the Handbook of Texas, the community had an estimated population of 180 in 2000.

== History ==
Len L. Lewis, a horse trader and former Union Army officer, helped establish the community in the late 1870s or early 1880s. After marrying a local widow, Lewis purchased a half-section of land and proceeded with plans to build a town and a town square – he hoped that the town would eventually serve as the seat of government for a new county. When a post office was established in 1882, the site was named London.

The community continued to grow, and by 1896, the population had grown to about 100. The number of residents reached an estimated 360 in 1930. The Great Depression caused a brief decline in London, but by 1943, the population had grown to 400. In the years after World War II, the community again suffered a decline in the number of people and businesses. The low point was reached in the early 1970s, when only around 110 people were living in the community. In the latter years of the 20th century, the population rose to around 180.

The London Town Square was designated a Recorded Texas Historic Landmark in 1971, marker number 2988.

Although London is unincorporated, it has a post office, with the ZIP code of 76854.

== Geography ==
London is located approximately 18 miles (29 km) northeast of Junction along U.S. Highway 377 in northeastern Kimble County, at the south end of FM 1221. Big Saline Creek flows past to the south of the community to its confluence with the Llano River approximately four miles to the southeast.

=== Climate ===
The climate in this area is characterized by hot, humid summers and generally mild to cool winters. According to the Köppen climate classification system, London has a humid subtropical climate, Cfa on climate maps.

== Education ==
Public education in the community of London is provided by the Junction Independent School District.

== See also ==
- London Hammer, artifact
