= Paluxy River =

River in Texas, United States

Coordinates: 32°14′51″N 97°43′08″W

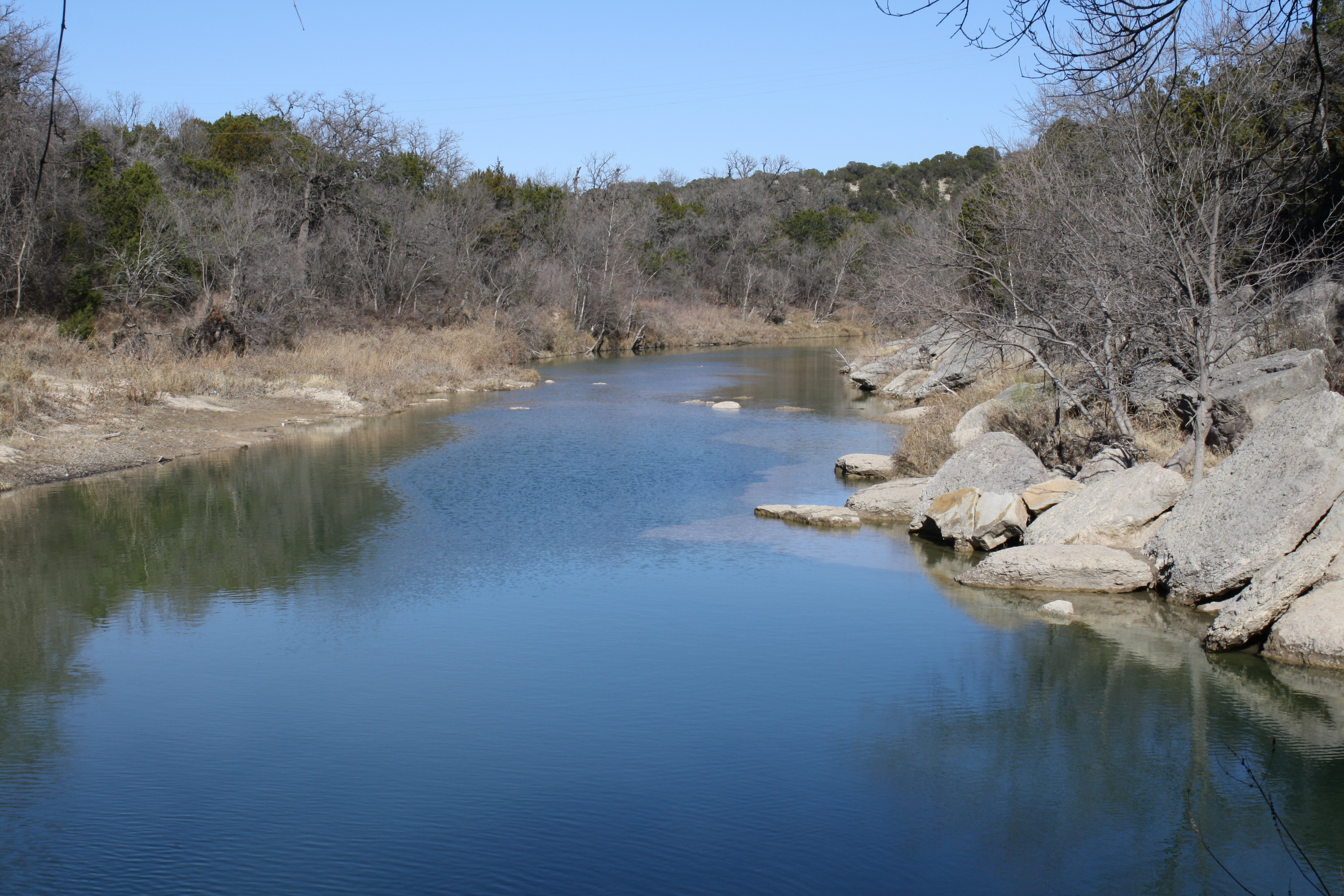
- Part of the river in 2009

Location
- Country: United States

Physical characteristics
- Length: 29 mi (47 km)

The Paluxy River, also known as Paluxy Creek, is a river in the U.S. state of Texas. It is a tributary of the Brazos River. It is formed by the convergence of the North Paluxy River and South Paluxy River near Bluff Dale, Texas in Erath County and flows a distance of 29 miles (47 km) before joining the Brazos just to the east of Glen Rose, Texas in south-central Somervell County.

It is best known for numerous dinosaur footprints found in its bed near Glen Rose at the Dinosaur Valley State Park. The Paluxy River became famous for controversy in the early 1930s when locals found dinosaur and supposed human footprints in the same rock layer in the Glen Rose Formation, which were widely publicized as evidence against the geological time scale and in favor of young-Earth creationism. However, these anachronistic "human" footprints have been determined to be elongated dinosaur tracks, river scour marks, and hoaxes.

== Paluxy trackways ==
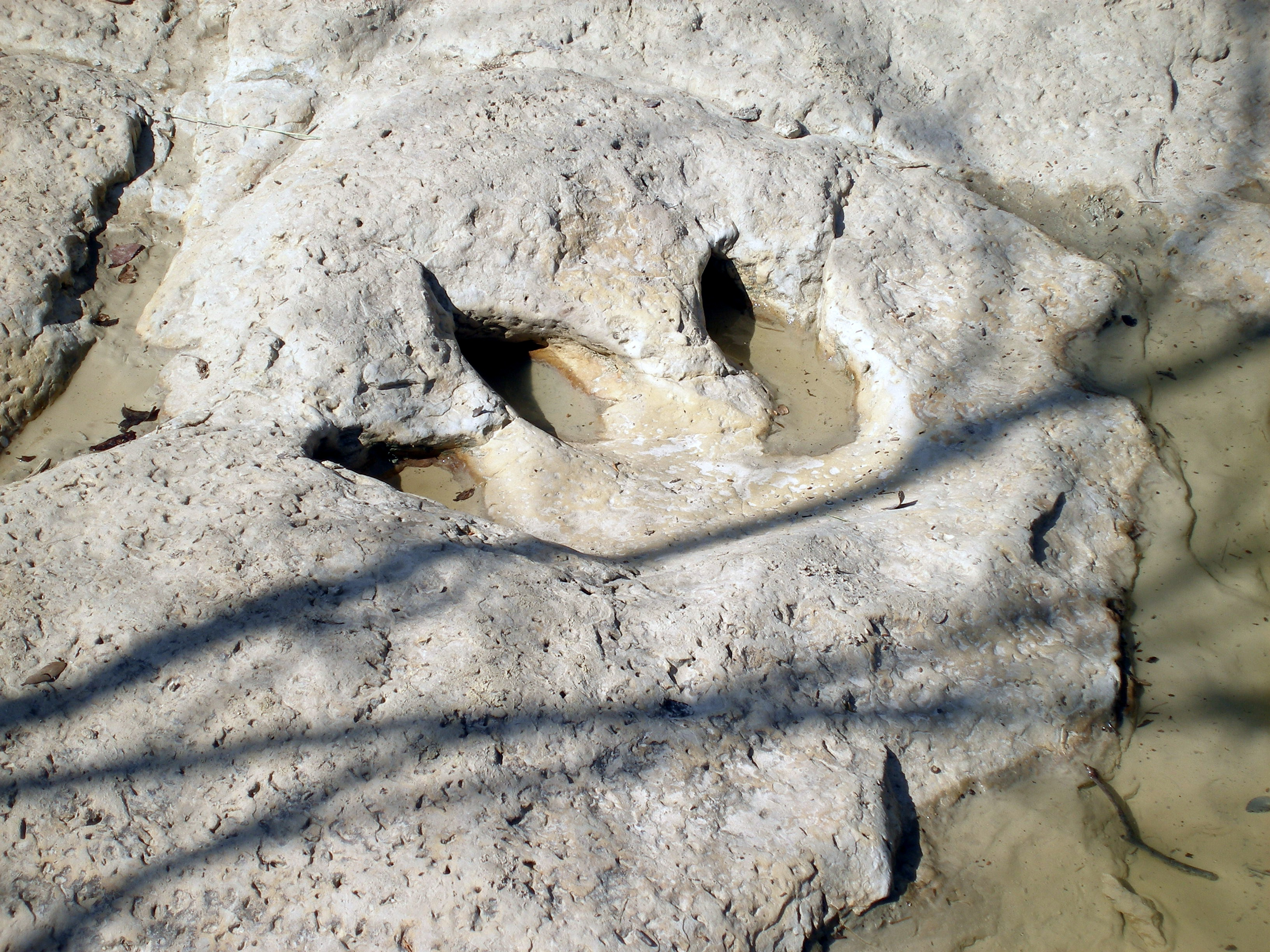
Dinosaur track by the river

Many dinosaur trackways and footprints have been discovered in the riverbed. The tracks were first observed by a local schoolboy (George Adams) at the beginning of the 20th century; the boy's teacher recognized them as dinosaur tracks. Large-scale scientific excavation and documentation were first carried out by paleontologist Roland T. Bird from 1935. The tracks were found in Lower Cretaceous limestone of the Glen Rose Formation.

One of the most well-known discoveries made by Bird was the "chase sequence", which contains the tracks of a herd of sauropods and at least one theropod that appears to follow the herd. These well-preserved tracks were excavated and removed from the riverbed by Bird's team slab by slab; portions of the trackways were then reassembled at the Texas Science and Natural History Museum in Austin, as well as at the American Museum of Natural History in New York City. The tracks have been attributed to dinosaurs similar to Sauroposeidon and Acrocanthosaurus, respectively. Other well-known and studied sites containing similar trackways are the Taylor Site, the Blue Hole Ballroom, and the Blue Hole Parlor.

=== Man track controversy ===
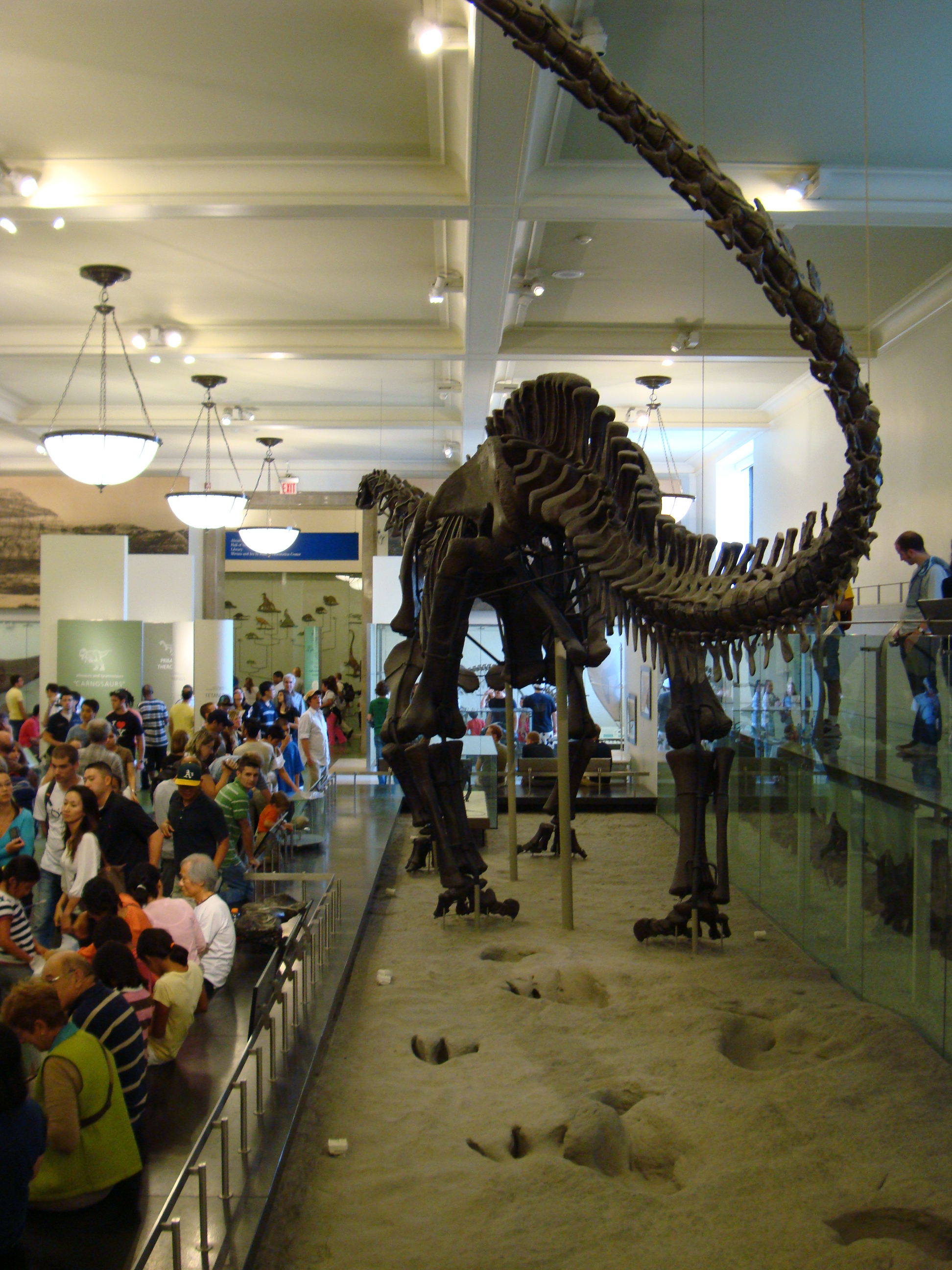
Slab of the trackway mounted at the AMNH, with Apatosaurus in the background

Peculiar indistinct and elongated tracks had long been known to the locals as "man tracks" or "moccasin tracks". Since 1939, young-Earth creationists began to popularize the tracks, claiming that some tracks were made by mythological giant humans, who lived at the same time as the dinosaurs that created the other tracks on the same surfaces. This idea became widely known especially due to the 1970 film Footprints in Stone by Stanley Taylor; one of the most human-like trackways has been dubbed the "Taylor trail". John C. Whitcomb, Henry M. Morris, John D. Morris, and Carl Baugh all are current or former proponents of the human footprint hypothesis. Though some still cite the trackways as evidence against the geological timescale, the general consensus is that all of the human tracks were either fake or interpreted incorrectly.

Some of these tracks were fake, carved by locals to sell during the Great Depression. Other man tracks are scour marks eroded by the river. Other tracks and trackways, however, were genuine tracks but showed features inconsistent with human footprints. Supporters of the human footprint hypothesis claimed that the tracks showed authentic mud "push-ups" and that the time period for the human and dinosaur trackways had to be the same as the trails intersected. In 1986, Glen Kuban found that most tracks are V-shaped, with indentations at the front that indicated the presence of three robust digit impressions, often with sharp claw marks. Kuban determined that the tracks were made by bipedal dinosaurs with three toes. Evidence based in human anatomy also refutes the claim that the footprints are of human origin. The foot length measurements were used to calculate approximate heights of the humans; the pace and stride lengths do not match these calculated heights, making the tracks being of human origin highly unlikely. The measurements, though, do fit the known values for bipedal dinosaurs.

While the dinosaurian origin of the tracks is well-established, their peculiar elongated shape proved to be more difficult to explain. The tracks typically show three-digit impressions that extended from the front end of an elongated trough. Kuban, in 1989, argued that this trough-like depression must have been left by the metatarsal bones of the foot, a part that is typically elevated above the ground in dinosaurs. Kuban observed that this metatarsus impression is usually on the same level with the digit impressions – suggesting that these dinosaurs must have walked with a plantigrade (or "flat-footed") foot posture. Both plantigrade and regular tracks that only consist of digit impressions were found at the sites, indicating that the dinosaurs could switch between both modes of locomotion, depending on behavior.

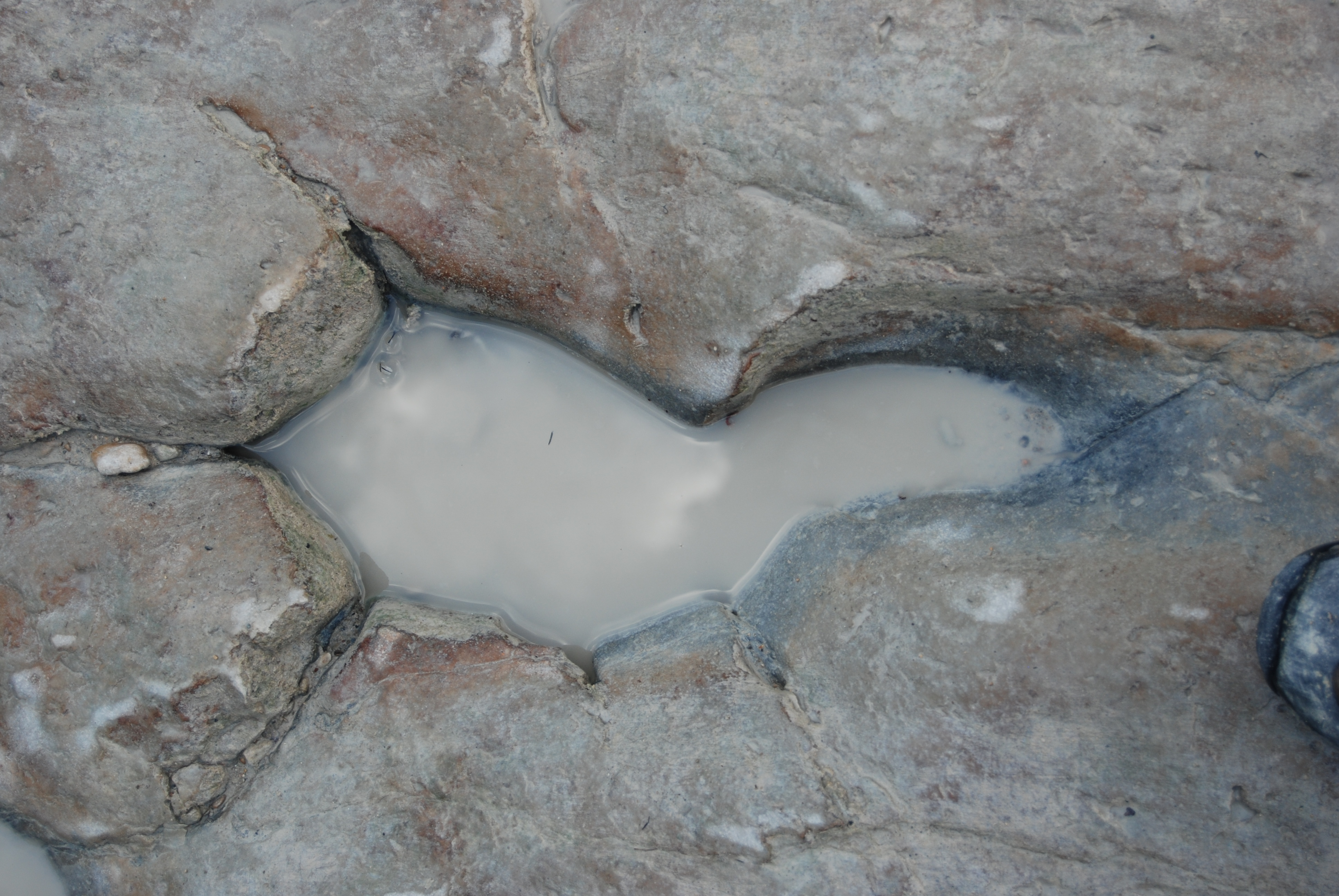
Collapsed track with an elongated shape

In 2021, Lallensack and colleagues confirmed that the elongated shape of the tracks resulted from the metatarsus of the foot contacting the ground, but these researchers argued that the dinosaurs were not walking with a plantigrade foot posture, but instead walked normally, with the metatarsus angled against the digits (and the ground). The metatarsal mark would have been created by deep sinking of the feet into soft mud, leading to partial or full immersion of the digits and metatarsus. The mud would have collapsed above the sinking foot, leaving a shallow track at the surface, sealing the path of the foot, which would have sunk much more deeply. This way, the metatarsal mark can be horizontal to the digit impressions, though the metatarsus itself was angled against the digits at all times. The narrow digit impressions would have collapsed more easily, resulting in their frequent absence in the tracks. The metatarsal mark, however, would have been reopened by the foot when it was finally extracted from the substrate. The hypothesis of a plantigrade locomotion, in contrast, was considered unlikely by these researchers. A plantigrade foot posture would have resulted in an ungainly gait, with short steps and a broad trackway. Trackways consisting of elongated tracks, in contrast, show long steps indicating speeds of locomotion comparable to those of regular trackways at the same sites, and these trackways are typically narrow, with one foot placed directly in front of another. Furthermore, a plantigrade locomotion would have resulted in a highly crouched limb posture while walking, which is unfeasible at large body sizes given the increased stresses on muscles, bones, and tendons.

== Digital recreation ==
Digital flythrough over the trackway

In 2014, a digital model was made of the chase sequence trackways from photographs taken in 1940 by Bird. The photographs were used to create the digital reconstruction of the tracks as they were in 1940, before excavations. Though the reconstruction shows high variations in quality in different parts of the model, it provides a good demonstration of historical photogrammetry used to model deteriorated sites and specimens.

== See also ==
- List of Texas rivers
- List of topics characterized as pseudoscience
- Paluxy, Texas
