= Dinosaur Valley State Park =

State park in Texas, United States

- IUCN category III (natural monument or feature)
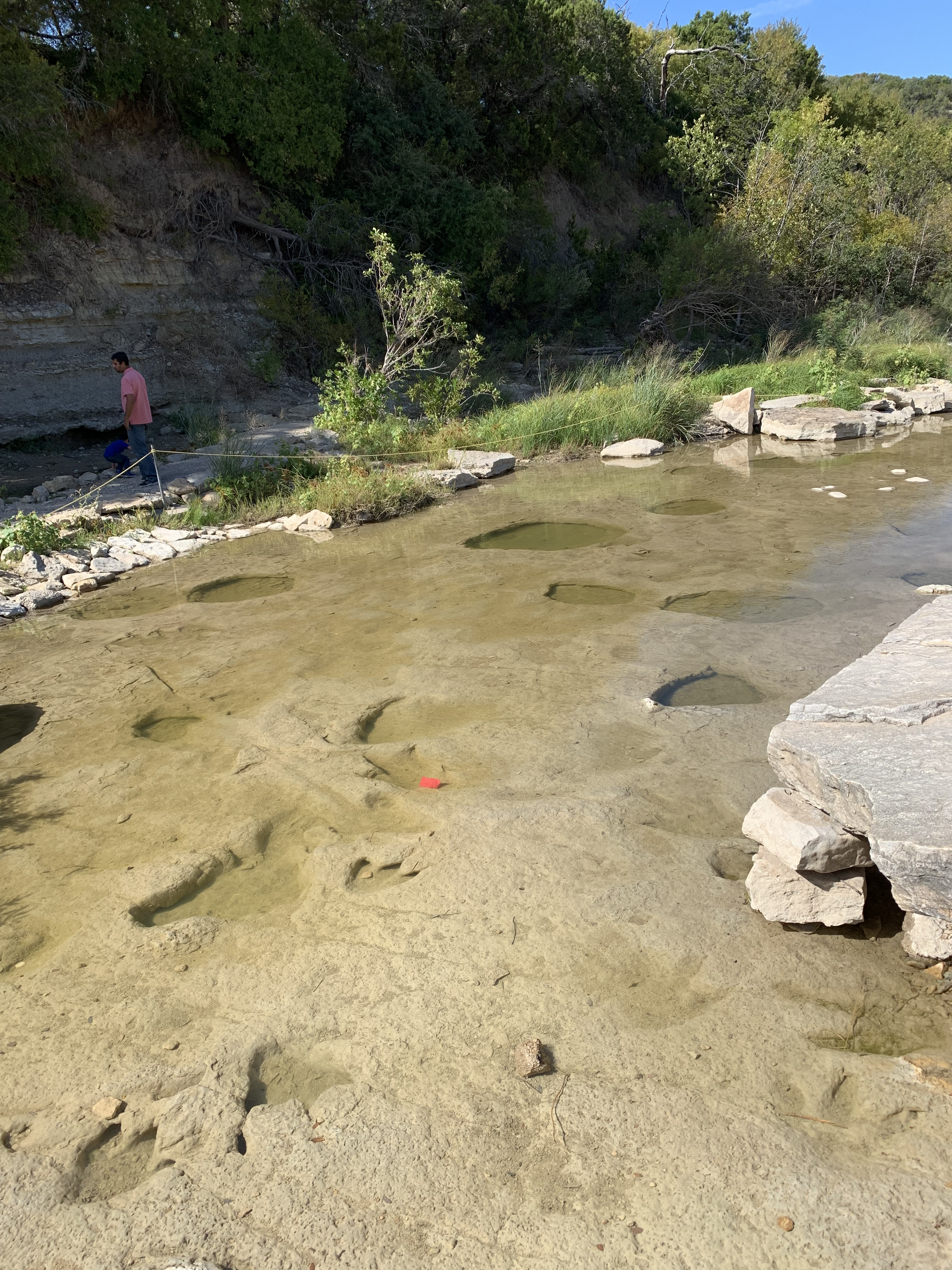
- The Paluxy River with visible dinosaur tracks in Dinosaur Valley State Park

- Location within Texas
- Location: Somervell County, Texas
- Nearest city: Glen Rose, Texas
- Coordinates: 32°15′11.7″N 97°49′6.91″W
- Area: 1,524.72 acres (6.1703 km^{2})
- Established: 1972
- Visitors: 230,424 (in 2025)
- Governing body: Texas Parks and Wildlife Department
- Website: Official site

U.S. National Natural Landmark
- Designated: 1968

Dinosaur Valley State Park is a 1,524.72-acre (617 ha) state park astride the Paluxy River in Somervell County, Texas, United States known for having 113 million-year-old well-preserved theropod and sauropod footprints across five main tracks throughout the park.

The park, managed by the Texas Parks and Wildlife Department, is also known for having two large models by Louis Paul Jonas of a Tyrannosaurus and a Brontosaurus, created for the 1964 New York World's Fair and donated by the Sinclair Oil Corporation after the world's fair closed..

In 2026, proposed construction of power infrastructure and data centers adjacent to the park resulted in public concerns as to their effects on the park's wildlife, tourism industry, watershed, nearby tracksites, as well as local residents' property rights, health, livelihoods, and resources.

Digital fly-through over the Glen Rose trackway, reconstructed from photographs

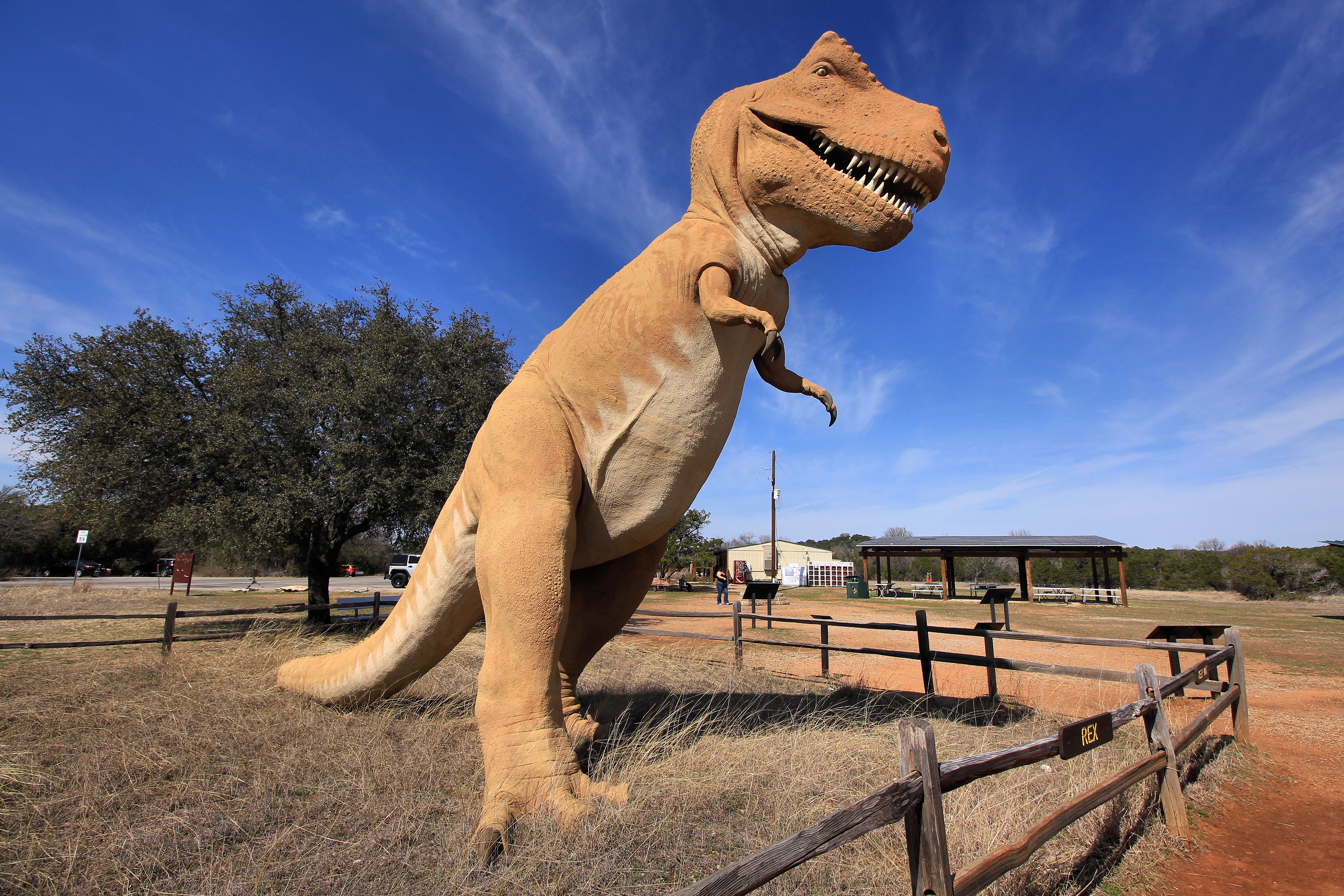
Tyrannosaurus model at Dinosaur Valley State Park in Texas

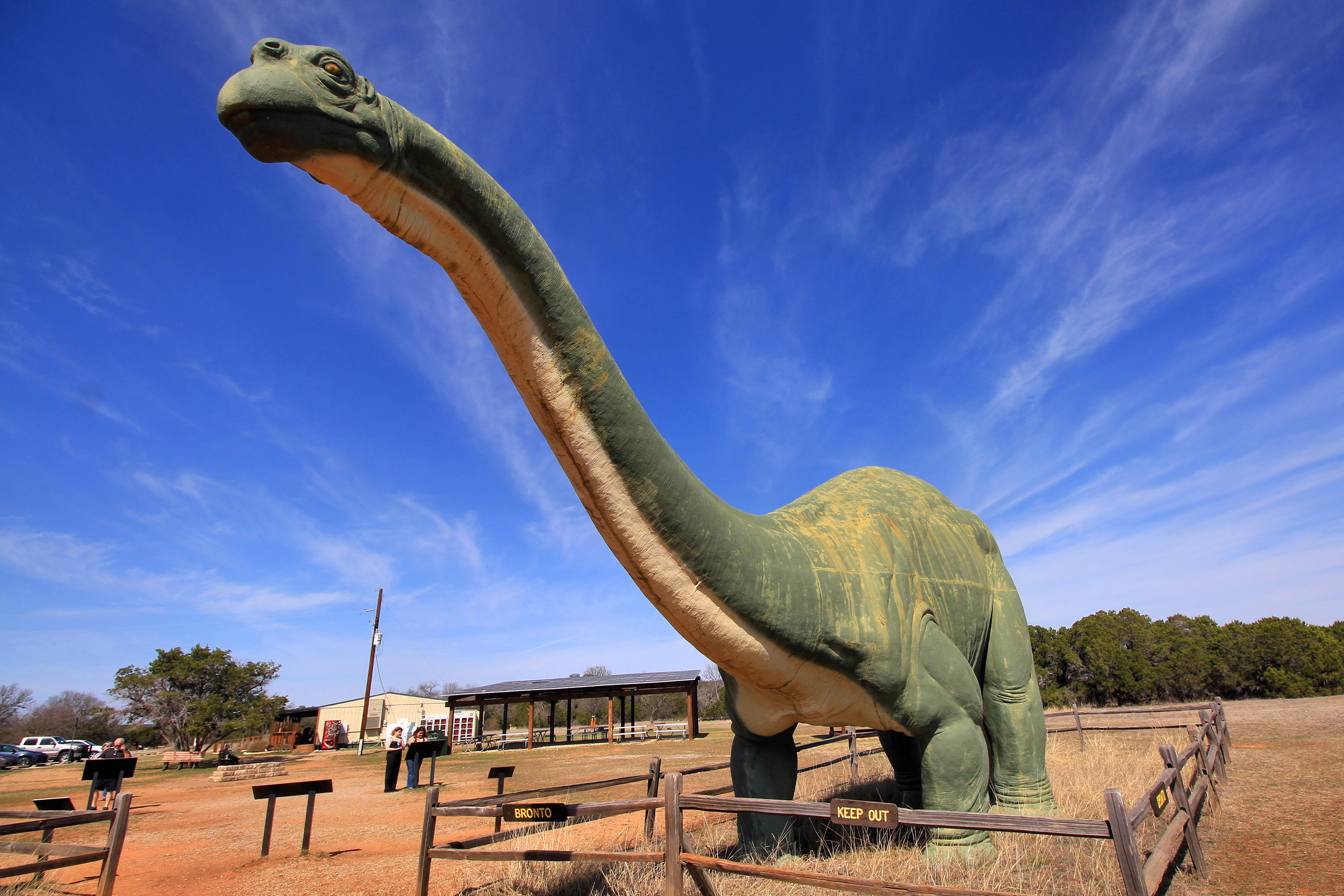
Brontosaurus model at Dinosaur Valley State Park in Texas

== History ==
Eastward-dipping limestones, sandstones, and mudstones of the Glen Rose Formation were deposited during the early Cretaceous Period approximately 113 million years ago along the shorelines of an ancient sea and form the geological setting for the park area. The tracks were formed when dinosaurs stuck their feet into fine-grained limy soft mud and their footprints were perfectly preserved.Over the last million years or so, these layered formations have been eroded, dissected and sculpted by the Paluxy River which, in many places, has cut down to resistant beds and planed off sizable exposures of rock in the river bottom.

In 1909, the area was uncovered when a child discovered "large, three-toed tracks" along the river following a flood on the Paluxy River a year earlier. Around 1928, upon becoming aware of the site, paleontologist R.T. Bird of the American Museum of Natural History in New York, visited the area and discovered sauropod tracks, which was "the first proof that sauropods walked on land".

The land for Dinosaur Valley State Park was acquired from private owners under the State Parks Bonds Program during 1968 and opened to the public in 1972. In addition to being a state park, it is also a National Natural Landmark.

== Purported human footprints ==
Near Dinosaur Valley State Park, in the limestone deposits along the Paluxy River, "twin sets" of tracks were found in the Glen Rose Formation as early as 1908. These footprints were once thought to be evidence that humans and non-avian dinosaurs lived at the same time, but now are identified to be created by dinosaurs. However, young-Earth creationists continue to believe that humans and non-avian dinosaurs lived at the same time, a notion that is contrary to the standard view of the geological time scale. Biologist Massimo Pigliucci has noted that geologists in the 1980s "clearly demonstrated that no human being left those prints", but rather "they were in fact metatarsal dinosaur tracks, together with a few pure and simple fakes".

The family of George Adams, who claimed to have found human footprints in the Glen Rose Formation, later admitted that Adams' and some others' fossil footprints were a hoax. Zana Douglas, the granddaughter of George Adams, explained that during the 1930s' Great Depression her grandfather and other residents of Glen Rose made money by making moonshine and selling "dinosaur fossils". The faux fossils brought $15 to $30 and when the supply ran low, they "just carved more, some with human footprints thrown in".

== Nature ==
=== Animals ===
Mammals include white-tailed deer, Mexican long-nosed armadillo, coyote, bobcat, eastern fox squirrel, Virginia opossum, eastern cottontail, common raccoon, and striped skunk. Birds include black-capped vireo, golden-cheeked warbler, and wild turkey.

=== Plants ===
Trees in the park include American elm, American sycamore, Ashe juniper, black willow, bur oak, cedar elm, eastern cottonwood, eastern black walnut, green ash, honey mesquite, pecan, post oak, sugar hackberry, Texas ash, Texas live oak, and Texas red oak.

== Activities ==
Hiking to find the dinosaur tracks may be the most popular activity in the park, but there is also camping, picnicking, mountain biking, and fishing, swimming and paddling in the Paluxy River.

== Data center controversy ==
In May 2025, Oncor Electric Delivery Company proposed the construction of approximately 250 miles of 765 kilovolt transmission lines in order to “provide safe and reliable electric service in the area”.

If approved as currently proposed, Oncor’s transmission line will run directly adjacent to the eastern and southern borders of Dinosaur Valley State Park. The power lines, 15 to 19 stories tall and 200 feet wide, will also be visible near the northern border of the park. The line is expected to, in part, support the power of nearby proposed data centers. Oncor stated that it “…recognizes the cultural, educational, and ecological importance of Dinosaur Valley State Park…” while a public petition raised concerns about the potential harm to the park and “nearby tracksites” the construction may cause.

The proposed data centers include the conditionally approved Comanche Project, proposed by Sailfish Development (Sailfish Investors). Lobbyists for the data center industry, including Dan Diorio of the Data Center Coalition, claimed that similar data centers have created hundreds of thousands of jobs in Texas and generated billions in tax revenue.

The potential development of related power infrastructure, the Comanche Project, and other nearby data centers concerns ranchers, landowners, and conservationists. The Comanche Project—on its own—would span 2,600 acres, an area greater than the size of the nearby city of Glen Rose. The large data center’s placement and water usage will directly affect the Paluxy River watershed, which feeds Dinosaur Valley State Park. Hood County proposed a 6-month moratorium on the development of the data centers and related power infrastructure in order to assess the local impact on agriculture, private property rights, a strained water supply, the local tourism industry, safety, public health, wildlife, taxpayer concerns on quality of life, and to potentially address outdated development laws.

Eight hours into a packed public hearing on the moratorium, a letter arrived from state Sen. Paul Bettencourt, R-Houston, chair of the Senate Committee on Local Government; whose financial donors include a range of energy and commercial development firms. Bettencourt's letter effectively forbid the moratorium based on legislative grounds passed shortly before, and thereby encouraged attorney general Ken Paxton to investigate any county commissioners implementing such a moratorium. The letter conditionally green-lit the data center and related projects and ultimately led the county commission to vote against the moratorium in a 3-2 vote. Commissioner Dave Eagle commented: “I think it’s interesting to get this letter today, don’t you…This isn’t a coincidence, right?...You’ve got to wonder what kind of backroom stuff was going on…This is just a threat letter to us.”

County Judge Ron Massingill stated that: “…data centers in the pipeline still have hurdles to overcome, including access to water. The Upper Trinity Ground Water District will have to approve providing the water…”

In response, The Sierra Club Lone Star Chapter launched an effort seeking to stop the construction of the transmission lines and data center via public petition. The Sierra Club provided concerned citizens with a petition template and instructions on how to “Protect the Paluxy Valley…help to stop the Comanche Circle project and help save Dinosaur Valley State Park” by contacting the Public Utility Commission of Texas and the Texas Commission on Environmental Quality, respectively.

== See also ==
- List of Texas state parks
- Trace fossil
- Sedimentary structures
