= Ica stones =

Decorated andesite stones found in Ica Province, Peru

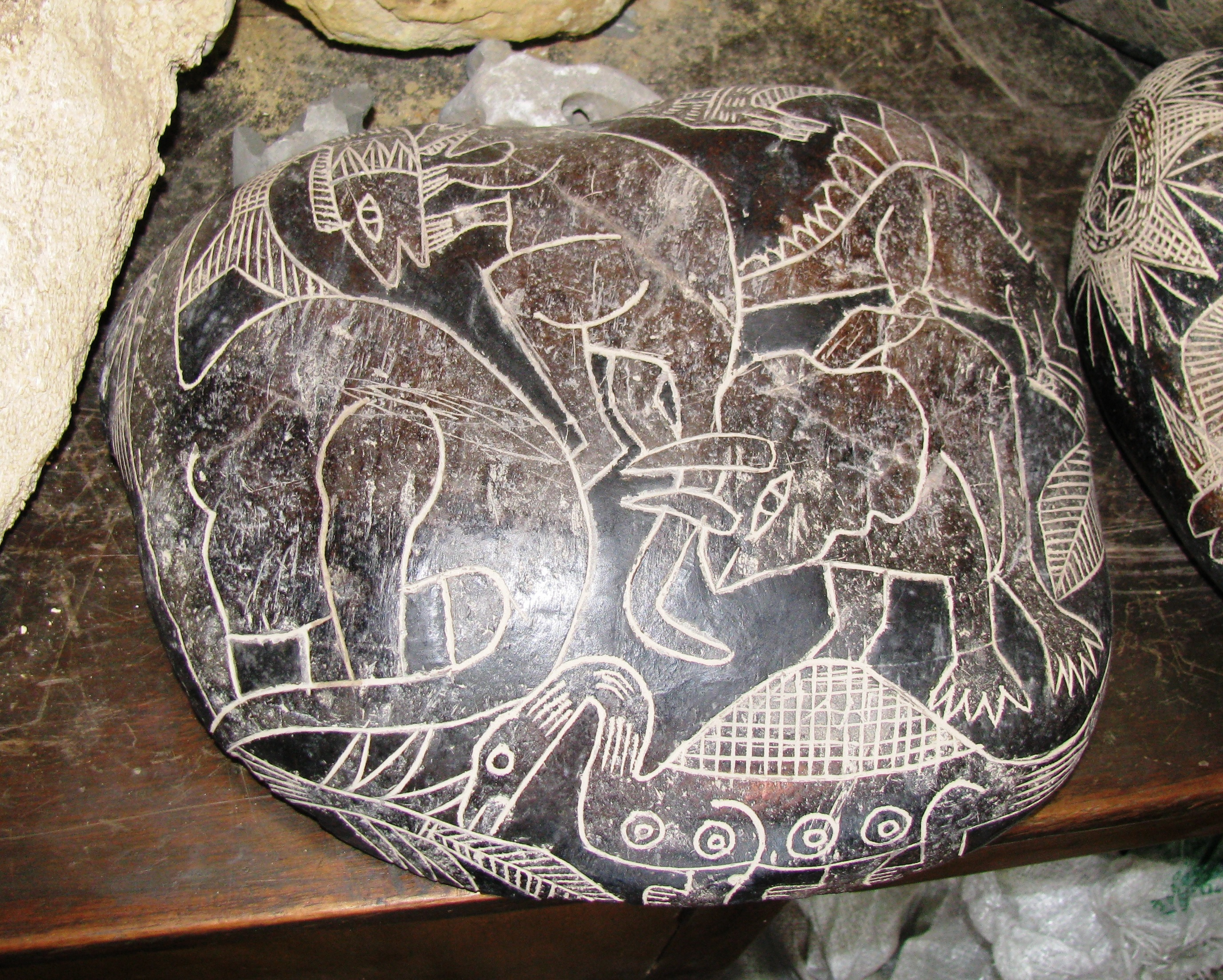
One of the Ica stones, featuring depictions of various different dinosaurs

The Ica stones are a collection of andesite stones with engraved motifs created as a work of art in the 1960s by Peruvian farmer Basilio Uchuya and others in the Ica Province. The artifacts, many of which notably depict non-avian dinosaurs and modern technology in a style imitating Mesoamerican art, were originally sold as having genuine pre-Columbian origin, before Uchuya and other farmers admitted to having created them for profit, leading some to describe the stones as hoaxes.

Stones with engraved artwork were first reported in Peru in the middle sixteenth century during the Spanish conquest. Subsequent archaeological finds have been next to non-existent, though huaqueros (grave robbers) at some point prior to the 1960s began selling stones similar to the Ica stones. The modern set of stones was first popularized in the 1960s and 1970s. The most widely known collection of stones, numbering around 20,000 individual objects, belonged to the physician Javier Cabrera Darquea. Cabrera purchased the majority of his stones from Uchuya, before the latter admitted the forgery, and believed them to represent evidence of an ancient interstellar civilization that once existed in Peru for hundreds of millions of years.

Even though the forgery was admitted and the artworks depict species of dinosaurs not known to have lived in South America with outdated notions of their anatomy, some groups such as Young Earth creationists and ancient astronaut proponents have cited the stones as evidence for their claims. It is possible that some of the Ica stones without fantastical depictions are genuine pre-Columbian artifacts, a possibility that is mainly maintained for stones not part of Cabrera's collection and with more conventional pre-Columbian motifs.

== Description ==
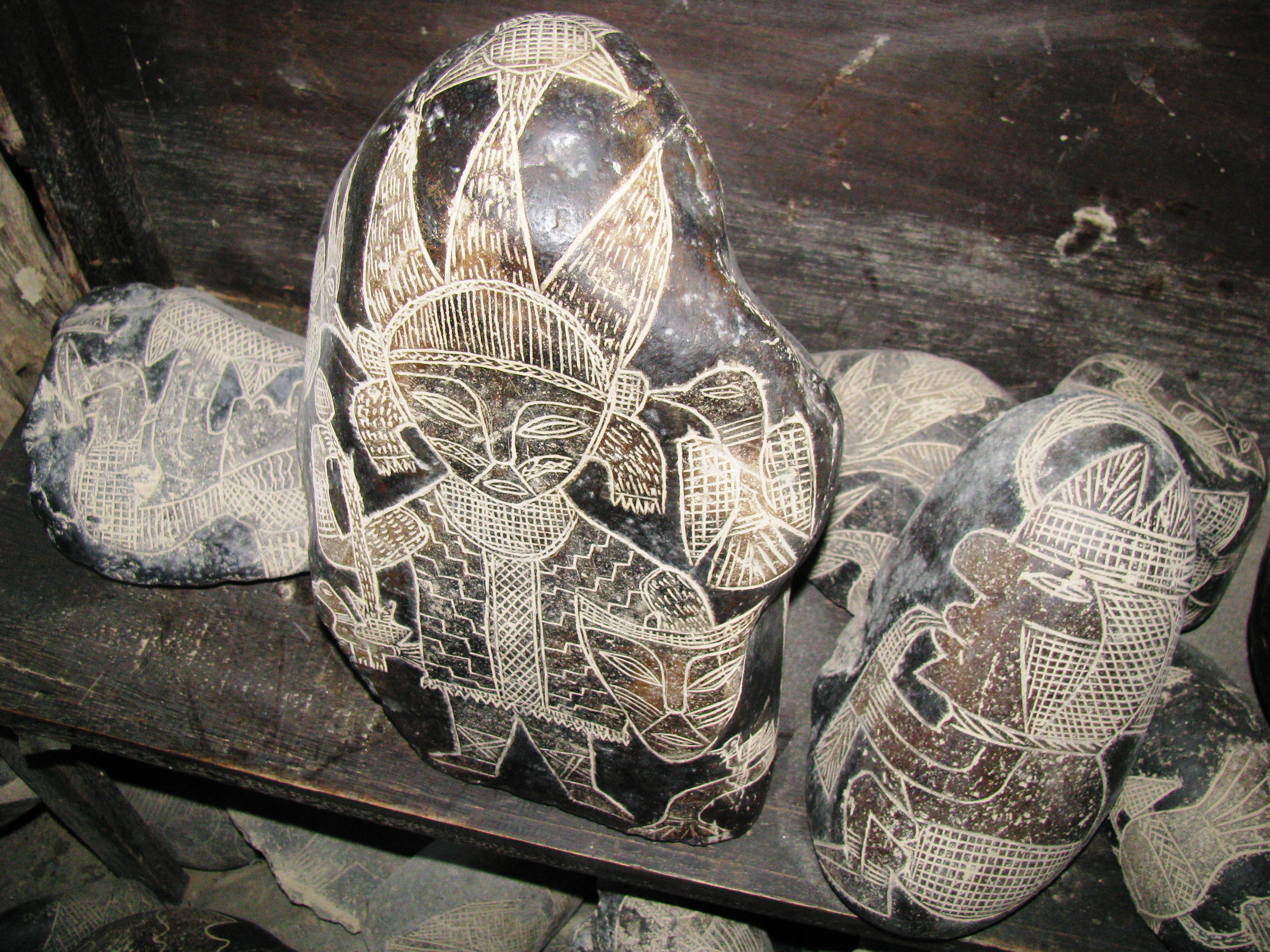
Two stones depicting human figures

The Ica stones have all been reported from the Ica Province in Peru. The stones are composed of grey andesite, a type of volcanic rock. They vary considerably in size, from very small (a few centimetres across) to boulders over half a metre across. The majority of the stones are relatively small.

All of the stones possess a dark patina on which the various motifs are engraved, scratched through the oxidized surface. Supposedly as a result of weathering, the patina is relatively thin, consisting of a weathering rind in which weathering has turned some of the feldspar into clay, resulting in a softer material, rated 3 to 4 on the Mohs scale of mineral hardness, soft enough to be scratched.

== History ==
=== Background ===
Archaeological discoveries show evidence of Peruvian cultures going back for several thousand years. At some later stages, the whole of modern Peru was united into a single political and cultural unit, culminating in the Inca Empire, followed by the Spanish conquest. At other stages, areas such as the Ica Valley, a habitable region separated from others by desert, developed distinctive cultures of their own.

Engraved stones have been known from the region since long before the Ica stones were reported. The earliest known reports of similar artifacts are records by the Jesuit missionary Padre Simón, who travelled Peru during the Spanish conquest of the Inca Empire in the early and middle sixteenth century. Examples of these stones were reportedly sent back to Spain in 1562.

Early archaeological excavations in the Ica Province in the late nineteenth and early twentieth century by scholars such as Max Uhle, Julio C. Tello, Alfred Kroeber, William Duncan Strong and John Howland Rowe did not result in any reports of the finding of engraved andesite stones. Nevertheless, engraved stones which had been looted by huaqueros (grave robbers) at some point began to be offered for sale to tourists and amateur collectors.

An extraordinary amount of Ica stones are known today, with the total number estimated to be around 50,000–100,000.

=== Cabrera's collection ===
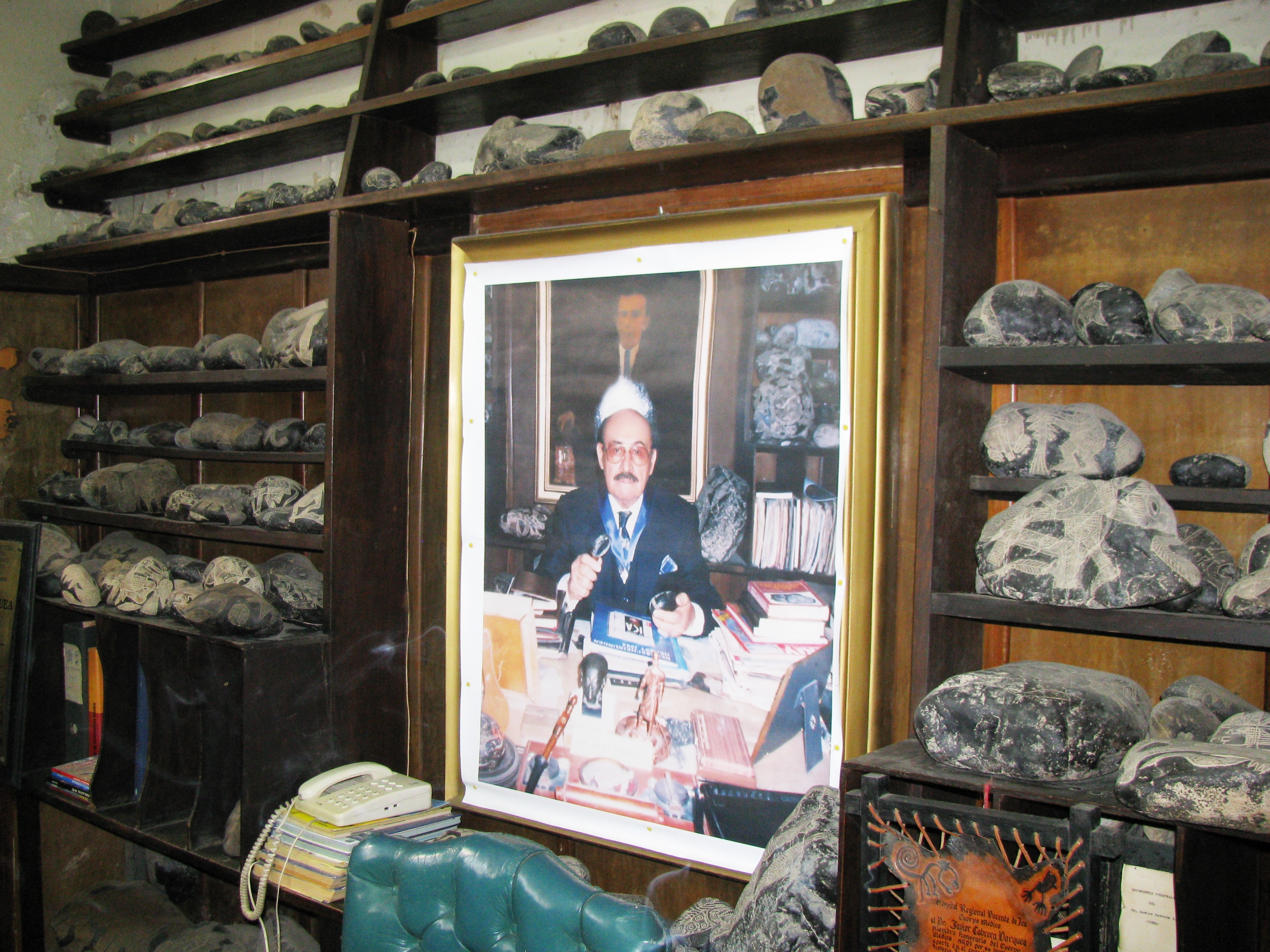
A collection of Ica stones surrounding a portrait of Javier Cabrera Darquea

The most widely known collection of Ica stones is that of the physician Javier Cabrera Darquea (1924–2001). According to Cabrera's own account, his interest in the stones was first triggered on 13 May 1966, when he was given one of the engraved stones as a birthday present by his friend Felix Llosa Romero. Possessing a keen interest in Peruvian prehistory, Cabrera identified the motif of the stone as a type of prehistoric fish. Cabrera never explained what particular fish species he believed the stone to depict or why he thought it was a prehistoric one.

In order to expand his collection Cabrera reached out to the brothers Carlos and Pablo Soldi, collectors of pre-Inca Peruvian artifacts. The Soldis reportedly had a large collection of similar engraved stones, according to them found in the Ocucaje region, and sold 341 of them to Cabrera. The Soldis claimed to have begun collecting the engraved stones in 1961, when a large number of them were supposedly uncovered through a flood of the Ica River.

Further stones were acquired by Cabrera through being purchased from the farmer Basilo Uchuya, who provided him with many thousands of them. In addition to his own set of acquired stones, Cabrera also kept a collection of similar stones supposedly found by his father, Bolivia Cabrera, at their plantation in the 1930s. By the late 1970s, Cabrera's collection contained over 11,000 engraved stones. While serving as a medical professional (including a tenure as the chief of the University of Lima's Department of Medicine) Cabrera initially kept his collection and interest a secret. By 1970 the stones and Cabrera's ideas concerning them were becoming well known.

In 1996, Cabrera stopped practicing medicine and opened a museum, the Museo de Piedras Grabadas ("Museum of Engraved Stones"), to showcase his collection. The museum is organized by the subject of the motif and the stones are lined up along the walls. By the end of his life, Cabrera's collection reportedly contained around 20,000 stones, many of which remain exhibited at his museum. The National Chamber of Tourism of Peru lists the museum as a tourist destination and leaves the question of their authenticity open.

Cabrera referred to the stones as "gliptoliths" and put forth his own hypothesis on their origins, published in his book The Message of the Engraved Stones of Ica. According to Cabrera, the stones were made by an ancient type of human which he called "Gliptolithic Man", who had larger brains than modern humans and could use their psychic energy to influence events in outer space. Gliptolithic Man supposedly appeared on Earth at least 405 million years ago and left the planet before the Cretaceous–Paleogene extinction event 66 million years ago to travel to a planet among the Pleiades. The extinction event was supposedly caused by two of the Earth's three moons colliding with the planet and also resulted in the sinking of Atlantis. Cabrera suggested that Gliptolithic Man left onboard electromagnetic spacecraft from the area that includes the Nazca Lines, which he thought was an "ancient spaceport". Before leaving, they had supposedly been a global civilization, among other things responsible for building the pyramids of Egypt. Due to a lack of evidence, Cabrera's interpretation has found little acceptance even among pseudohistorians.

=== Calvo's collection ===
Stone with an abstract or flower design reportedly found in 1966 by Santiago Agurto Calvo in a Paracas culture tomb

Ica stones were also collected by the architect Santiago Agurto Calvo, rector of the National University of Engineering in Lima. In addition to reportedly purchasing many such stones from locals, Calvo organized searches in ancient cemeteries and in August 1966 reported the finding of an engraved stone in the Toma Luz sector, Callango district, in Ica Valley. The context of the find reportedly corresponded to the Tiwanaku culture. Calvo believed that the engraved stones were part of some ancient burial ritual.

Calvo reported his discovery to the Regional Museum of Ica, and was accompanied on further expeditions by its curator, the archaeologist Alejandro Pezzia Assereto. In September 1966 in Uhle Hill cemetery, De la Banda sector, Ocucaje District, they reportedly found an engraved stone in a tomb of the Paracas culture. On the small stone, a few centimetres across, was engraved a design which might be abstract, or could be taken as a flower with eight petals. Calvo published the discovery in a Lima newspaper. Pezzia continued to search. In the San Evaristo cemetery in Toma Luz, he reported the find of an engraved stone of similar size to the previous one, depicting a fish. The context reportedly dated the tomb to the Middle Horizon (c. 600–1000 A.D.). In a nearby grave in the same cemetery, Pezzia reported the find of a stone depicting a llama. Pezzia published his findings in 1968, including drawings and descriptions.

In 1968, Calvo donated some of the stones of his collection to the Regional Museum of Ica, and also unsuccessfully sought to have the region where they had been found made into a special preserve so that ancient objects could not be removed illegally. The stones were exhibited at the museum, labelled as "pre-Inca burial art", until they were removed in 1970 once Cabrera's collection and ideas concerning similar stones began to be publicized, the museum now believing them to be hoaxes.

== Imagery ==
The Ica stones are engraved with various types of images. Some images are directly incised whereas others have been made by removing the background, leaving the image in relief. The images vary from simple pictures on one side of a pebble to designs of great complexity. Some of the designs are in styles reminiscent of the historical Paracas, Nazca, Tiwanaku, or Inca cultures.

=== Dinosaurs ===
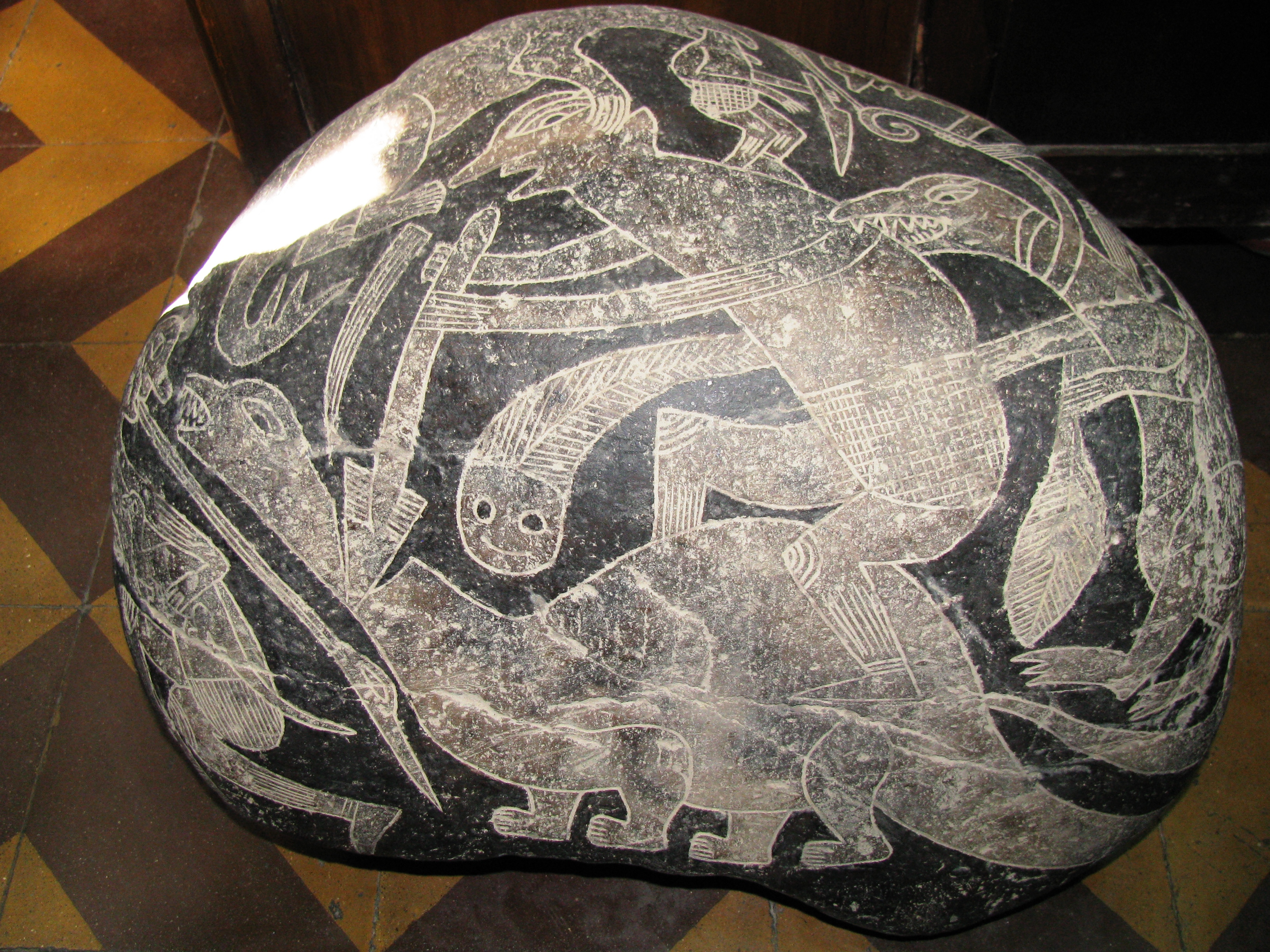
Stone depicting a human killing a sauropod, while being attacked by a tail-dragging theropod

Several of the stones are engraved with depictions of various extinct animals, mostly different types of dinosaurs. Among the dinosaurs depicted are different theropods, sauropods, ceratopsians and stegosaurs. Also present among the stones are depictions of pterosaurs. The stones only depict extinct animals that were already known to science at the time of the stones being "discovered". The animals depicted do not correspond to fossil finds in the region surrounding Ica; no dinosaur remains are known from the area and several groups shown (such as ceratopsians) are not known from South America at all.

In some cases, the dinosaurs are depicted as being hunted or domesticated by humans. Some scenes appear to depict humans engaged in something akin to pitched battles with the dinosaurs and some of the depictions of hunting allegedly show humans chopping at critical nerves in the dinosaurs' spines, supposedly showing advanced knowledge of their anatomy.

Many of the dinosaurs depicted on the Ica stones reflect now outdated ideas of dinosaur life appearance, corroborating that the stones are hoaxes. One of the stones for instance shows a Tyrannosaurus-like theropod dinosaur with a nearly upright posture and dragging its tail behind it on the ground; this is accurate to depictions of Tyrannosaurus in the 1960s but does not reflect the current scientific understanding of the animal. Additionally, some depictions of theropods on the stones show them as having five fingers and five toes, inconsistent with fossil evidence. Some of the images appear to show a dinosaur lifecycle in which larvae hatched from dinosaur eggs before undergoing a form of metamorphosis to grow into the various adult forms; highly inconsistent with real dinosaur lifecycles. One of the stones shows a human riding on a Pteranodon-like pterosaur, an impossible scene given that the animal likely could not have supported the weight of a human in flight.

=== Humans and technology ===
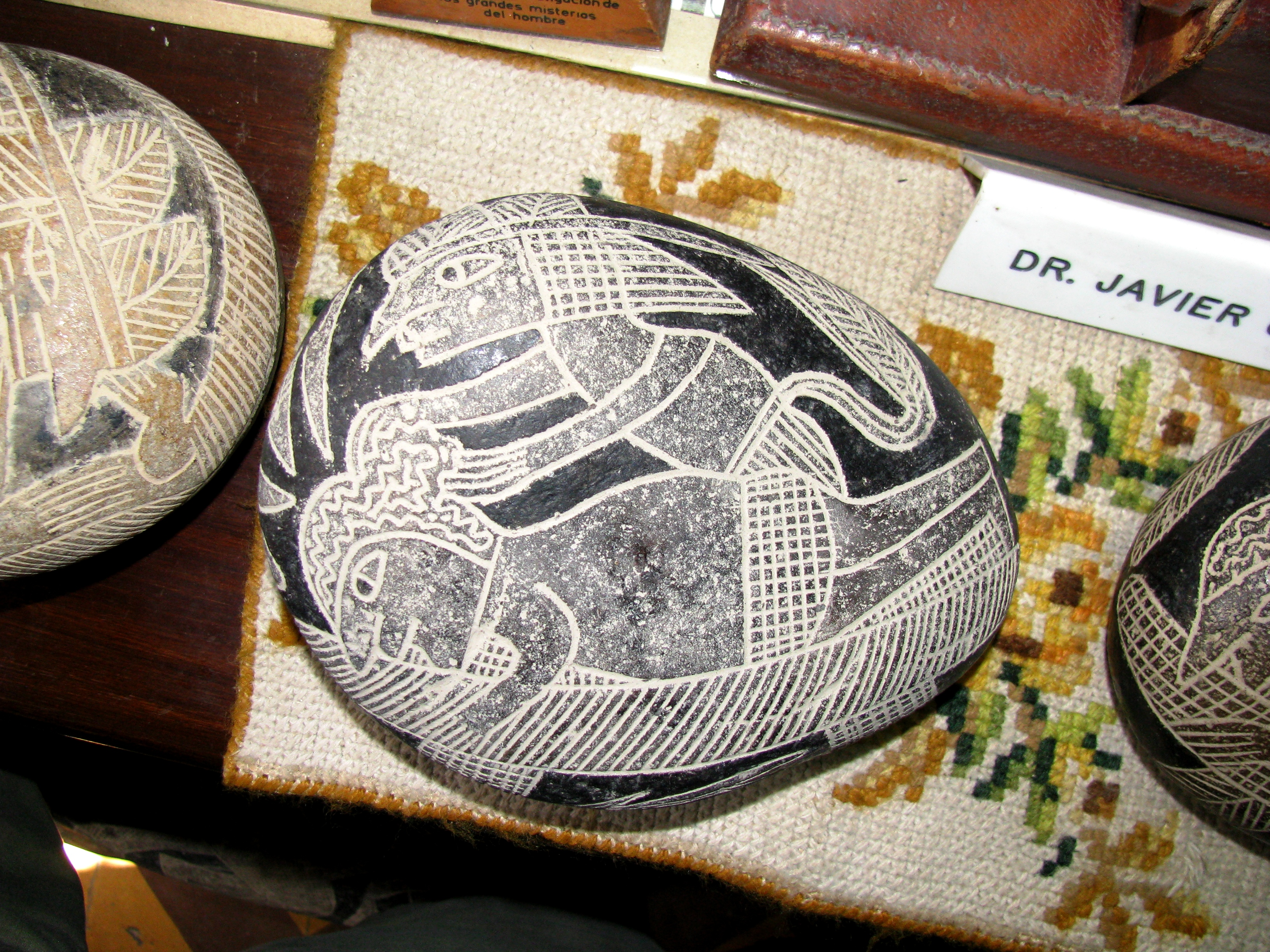
Stone supposedly depicting brain surgery

The humans depicted on the stones, supposedly belonging to some unknown ancient Peruvian culture, are reminiscent of Incas or Aztecs. Some stones have been suggested to depict anachronistic and highly advanced technology, including medical professionals performing complex surgeries, acupuncture, genetic engineering, humans observing the heavens through telescopes, flying machines, and spaceships. Among the surgeries depicted are heart and brain surgeries, caesarean sections, and transplants of hearts, livers, and kidneys.

Most human figures are stylized with big heads and long noses. They appear to differ from all of the well-known ancient cultures in the area. The figures are depicted as wearing loincloths and feather headresses and when shown in scenes of warfare they carry axes and spears as weapons, despite the advanced technology shown otherwise. Those who believe the stones to be authentic defend the apparent contradiction between the clothing and tools and the advanced technology by suggesting that all cultures may not progress through the same technological path or that the stones might depict sports or rituals.

If a society as advanced as the one alleged to be depicted on some of the stones existed in the region it is highly unlikely that the only trace uncovered of them would be the artwork on the Ica stones. Other expected finds that could corroborate such a civilization having existed would for instance include ruins of advanced structures, garbage, as well as graves and bones, none of which has been found.

=== Other designs ===
Some stones are engraved with depictions of maps of the land or the stars. There are stones depicting acts of bestiality, some of which have been referred to as "pornographic". Some stones feature images are of flowers, fish, or extant animals of various sorts; in some cases the depicted extant life is out of place in Peru, such as depictions of kangaroos.

== Impact and investigation ==
=== Interpretation ===
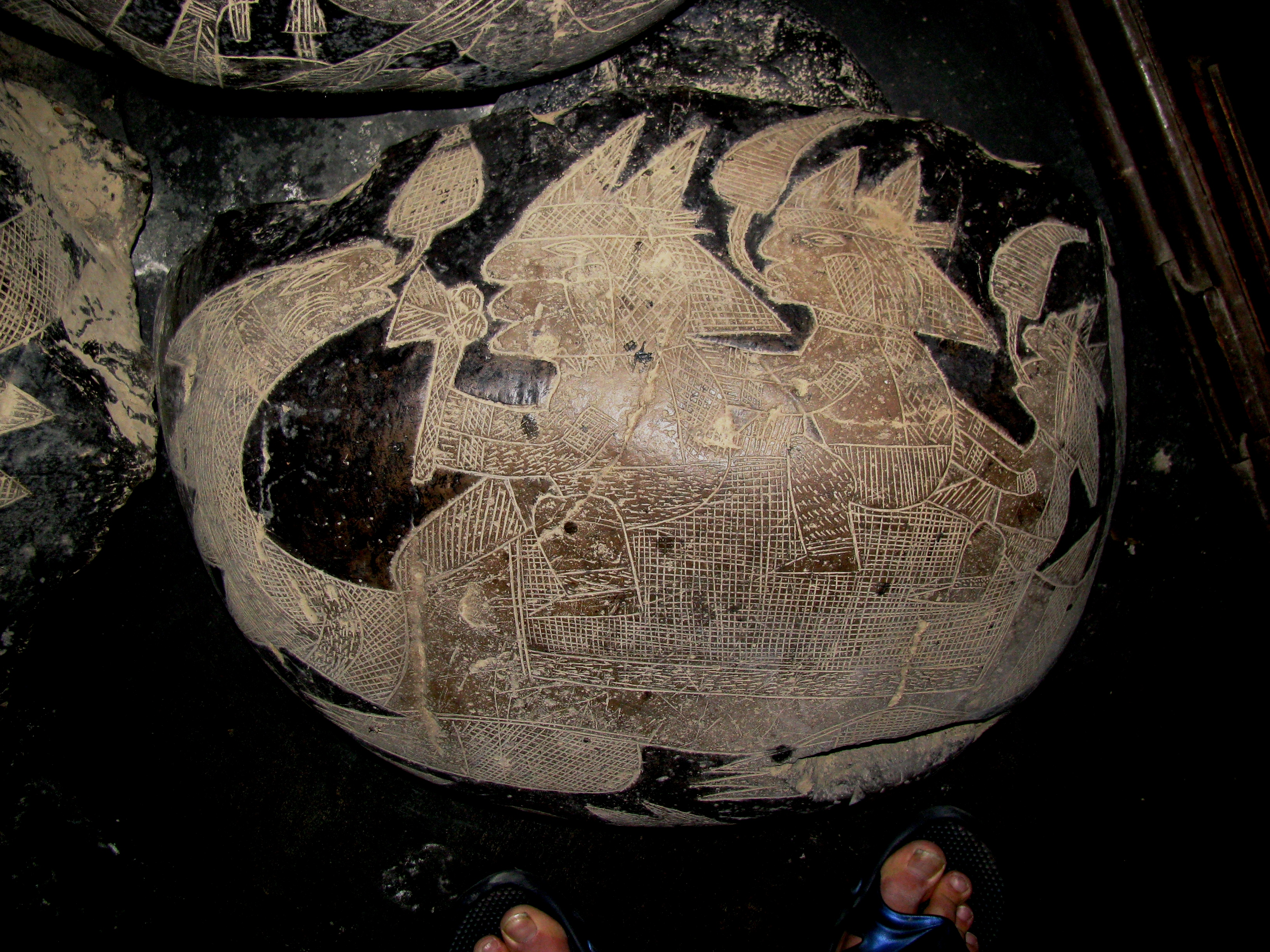
Stone appearing to depict humans riding on a dinosaur

The Ica stones are generally considered by historians and archaeologists to have been thoroughly exposed as forgeries and to be hoaxes created for the purpose of earning money off of tourist buyers. Selling artifacts is a profitable business; even replicas of the Ica stones tend to fetch high prices online. In his Encyclopedia of Dubious Archaeology, the archaeologist Ken Feder commented that the Ica stones were "one of the most transparent and absurd archaeological hoaxes ever perpetrated" and that they were "not the most sophisticated of the archaeological hoaxes discussed in this book, but they certainly rank up there as the most preposterous." Current scientific understanding separates non-avian dinosaurs (dinosaurs other than birds) from humans by 66 million years and it is consequently considered highly unlikely that humans and dinosaurs could have coexisted in the manner depicted on the Ica stones. No non-avian dinosaur fossil has even been dated to an age contemporary with humans.

The Ica stones were popularized by Cabrera internationally and became publicized in magazines and newspapers throughout the world. Some pseudoscientific communities enthusiastically accepted the Ica stones as evidence for various ideas. As supposed "out-of-place artifacts", the stones have become staples of pseudoarchaeological literature. The popularization of the stones made Cabrera famous in pseudoscientific circles but also ruined his professional credibility and family life and brought him ridicule in the press and the contempt of scientists.

The stones came to the attention of proponents of the ancient astronauts hypothesis (the idea of extraterrestrial visitors to Earth in the ancient past) such as Erich von Däniken and Robert Charroux and were extensively publicized in books during the 1970s, claimed to present evidence of an advanced civilization before the extinction of the dinosaurs. The stones have also been used as evidence by Young Earth creationists for the idea that dinosaurs and humans coexisted in relatively recent times, fitting with their idea of an Earth only a few thousand years old. Replicas of the Ica stones are sometimes showcased internationally in exhibitions by creationist institutions. The stones are also sometimes presented as evidence by "mytho-historians" who believe that some ancient myths should be understood as accurate and literal historical accounts. Some previous supporters of the stones' authenticity, including von Däniken, have since concluded that the stones are most likely fake.

=== Analysis ===
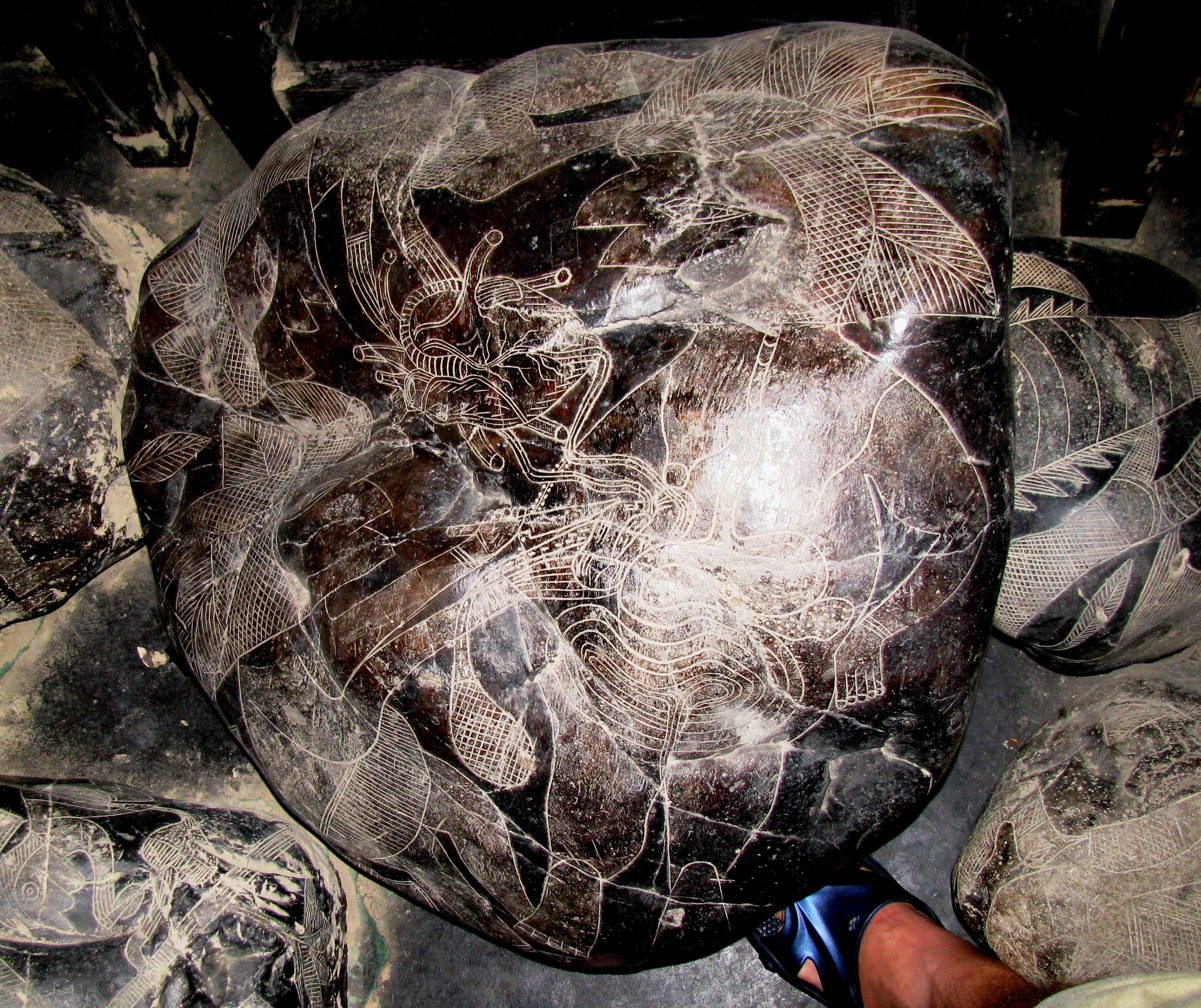
Stone supposedly depicting a heart transplant

Cabrera claimed to promote scientific analysis of the stones and claimed to have sent individual specimens to researchers at the universities of Bonn and Lima. Both a researcher at Bonn and the mining engineer Eric Wolf, a personal friend of Cabrera, supposedly confirmed that the stones are made of andesite and that they seem to be of significant age due to their oxidized patina. No evidence for these results or for the analyses ever having taken place has ever been presented. Even if these unverified assessments of significant age for the stones is true, it would not confirm an ancient age for the engravings since there is no patina in the grooves. The lack of a patina covering the sharp engravings instead suggests that they are recent.

In 1977, a BBC team visited Ica as part of the filming of the Horizon episode "The Case of the Ancient Astronauts". Cabrera provided the team with one of the small stones, which was later analyzed in London. The stone itself was found to possibly be Mesozoic in age but the engravings were determined to be recent since the clean edges of the incisions were unlikely to stay that way for long due to erosion. The engraving was thus determined to have been carried out after the oxidation process. In 1993 and 1994, some Ica stones were examined in Barcelona and evidence was found for the engravings having been made recently with tools such as saws, acids, and sandpaper.

In 2003, the Dating and Radiochemistry Laboratory at the Autonomous University of Madrid conducted absolute thermoluminescence dating of carbonate deposits from the “Cerro La Peña” site in Ocucaje (Ica Department, Peru), published by Félix Arenas Mariscal and María del Carmen Olázar in 2007, which yielded a very broad dating range of 100,000 to 60,000 years BP for some engraved stones depicting surgical procedures and covered by caliche. In March of the same year, the Rocasolano Institute of Physical Chemistry of the CSIC performed carbon-14 dating on a textile associated with another stone engraved with a bird at Cerro Blanco (La Peña), dating it to between the 6th and 7th centuries CE.

=== Identification as hoaxes ===
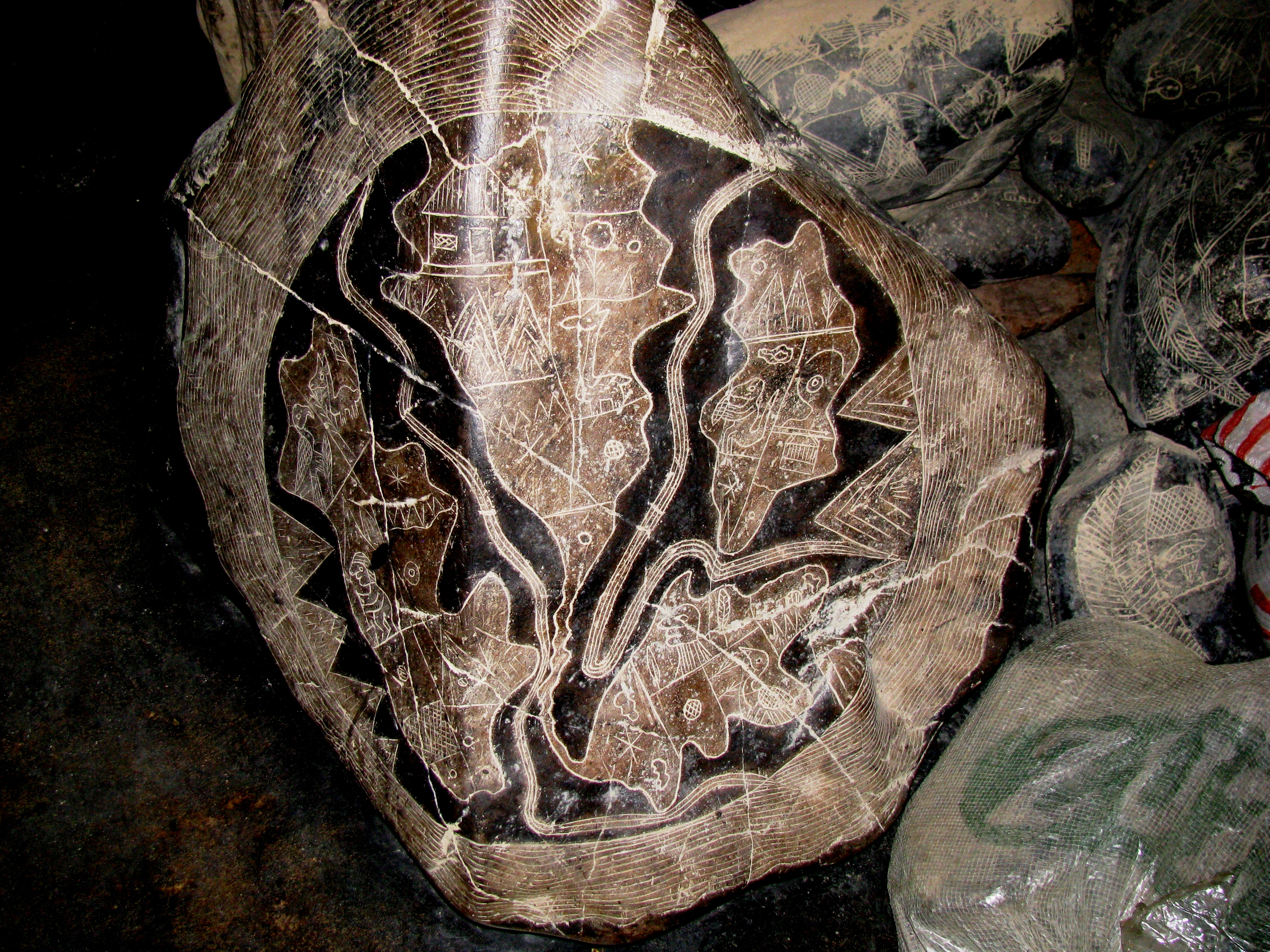
Stone appearing to depict a map

After the stones were publicized in a critical BBC documentary, they began to draw the attention of the Peruvian authorities and press. The sale of Peruvian cultural heritage is illegal and the authenticity of the stones thus became a legal matter. After being arrested and interrogated, Uchuya admitted that the stones were hoaxes that he and his wife Irma Gutiérrez had engraved themselves and sold to Cabrera. Their stated motive had been to make money from tourists and to inspire pseudohistorians such as von Däniken. The inspiration for the different engravings had supposedly been comic books, textbooks, and magazines. After he was let go, Uchuya continued to make and sell similar stones, though no longer passed them off as genuine.

Uchuya reportedly produced the dark patina of the stones through baking them in donkey and cow dung and massaging them with boot polish. The engravings were made using a dentist's drill, knives, and chisels. At another time, Uchuya claimed that after he had etched the artwork on the stones, he placed them in his poultry pen and "the chickens did the rest". He reportedly made stones for Cabrera over a period of ten years. The process of making the stones has been documented by several TV crews and can reportedly take as little as 15 minutes.

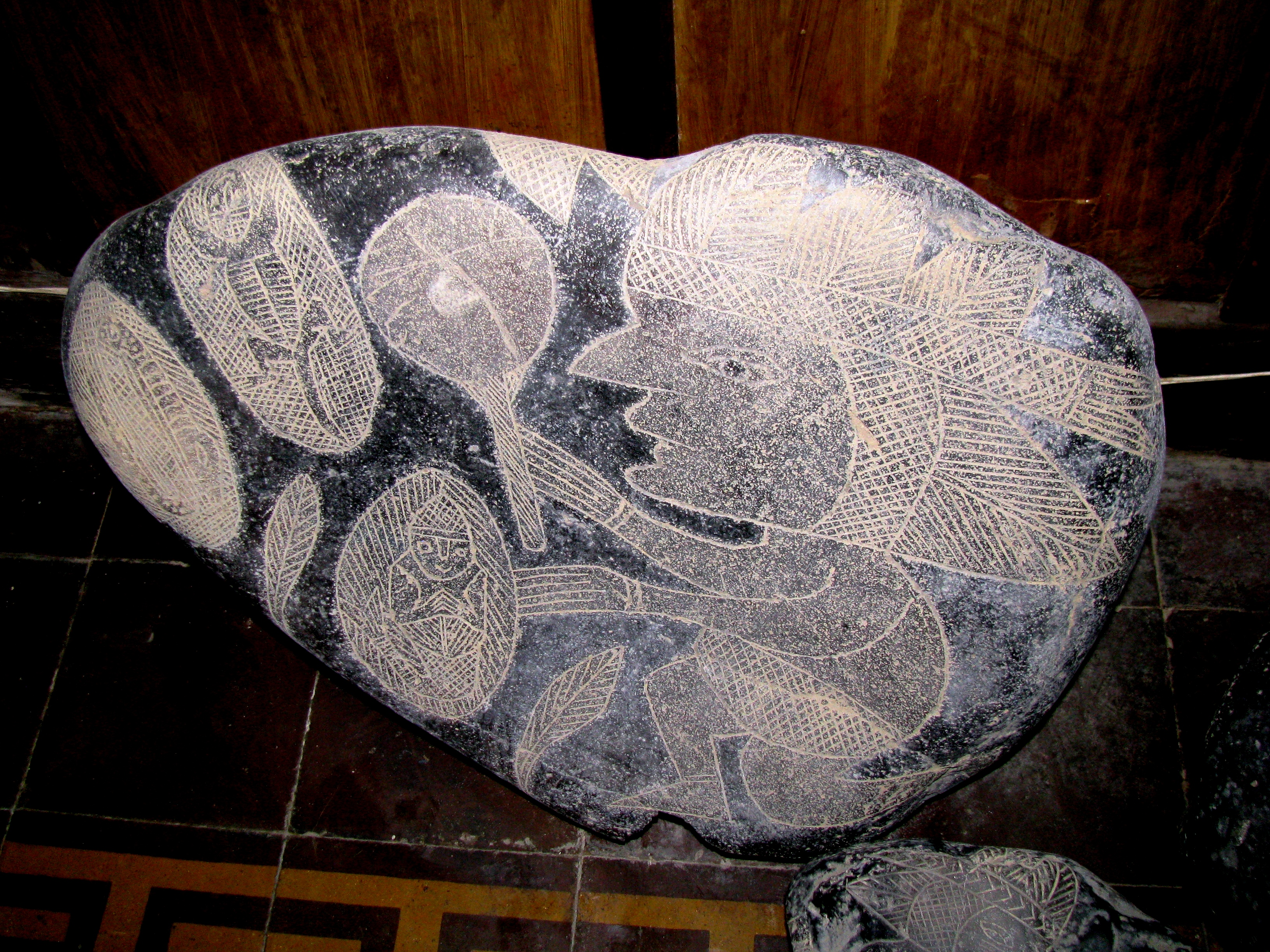
Stone depicting a human engaged in an unclear activity

Despite Uchuya's confession, supporters of the stones' authenticity were not convinced that they were fakes. Doubt was cast both on his confession, suggested to have been done simply to avoid prison time, and on the idea that a poor farmer without a formal education could have made tens of thousands of stones. Uchuya is far from the only farmer known to have made such stones. In addition to Uchuya and Gutiérrez, other self-admitted makers of Ica stones include Pedro Huamán, Aparicio Aparcana, and others. In later interviews, Uchuya has contradictingly corroborated that he faked the stones or stated that he simply claimed to have done so to avoid prison. In a 1995 interview for the NBC documentary The Mysterious Origins of Man, Uchuya again admitted to the hoax but also claimed that Cabrera in his collection had "about 5000 genuine stones", either real artifacts or made by someone else.

There is no evidence that Cabrera colluded with Uchuya to produce fake stones or that his motivation was any other than to preserve what he thought were genuine artifacts and try to generate archaeological interest. Cabrera being a medical professional and supposedly medical scenes being common on the stones has led some to suggest that Cabrera was also involved in their creation. Despite Uchuya's confession, Cabrera continued to maintain that the stones were real. His explanation for this was that the stones made by Uchuya were copies or replicas of original, real, stones so that they could be sold to tourists legally. According to Cabrera, the number of fake Ica stones was very small, only about 20–40 specimens. Cabrera has also stated that there existed genuine hoards of stones at a secret location guarded by "Uchuya and others", including in a secret cave near the Ica River. No evidence has been presented for the supposed cave's existence and the story is by skeptics presumed to have been made up by Cabrera. Von Däniken claimed in his book Gold of the Gods to at one point have been taken to the cave by Cabrera but later admitted to have made this up when the story was disputed by Cabrera.

In some cases, the designs on the stones clearly reflect cultural sentiments around the time of their "discovery". Around the time of the AIDS epidemic in the 1980s and 90s, "newly discovered" stones for instance appeared to warn of homosexual promiscuity as a risk factor for weakening the immune system.

=== Possibly authentic stones ===
It is possible that some of the Ica stones are authentic artifacts, a notion for instance supported by the early Spanish records of similar stones. The large number of stones has been used as an argument both for and against the idea that some are authentic. The number of stones could for instance be interpreted as evidence against their authenticity since it might indicate large amounts of them having been made for the purposes of selling them to tourists. Modern "Ica artists" have allegedly followed in Uchuya and Gutiérrez's footsteps in producing new forged stones, some based on their designs.

No studies have been made attempting to distinguish possible genuine stones in the collections. Even if some of the more outlandish stones were genuine artifacts, their motifs could plausibly depict less anachronistic scenes than what has been claimed; the images are all highly stylized and what precisely is being depicted is in many cases not clear. It is for instance possible that scenes interpreted as showing advanced surgery in reality show acts of mutilation and some supposed flying machines could alternatively be interpreted as birds.

It is possible that the stones donated to the Regional Museum of Ica by Calvo are genuine. In contrast to those in Cabrera's collection, Calvo's stones supposedly have shallower cuts, show finer workmanship, and do not depict any extinct animals, unconventional humans, or advanced technology. The motifs of Calvo's stones are typical of pre-Columbian artwork, for instance depicting flowers and birds. If Calvo's stones were to be verified as genuine, it would not imply that the more outlandish stones in Cabrera's collection are also genuine.

In order to defend the assertion that the stones were made by an advanced civilization, Cabrera stated that andesite is a hard stone that is difficult to carve, particularly using stone tools. Contrary to Cabrera's assessment, the stones are not carved but engraved; the engravings were made through scratching away the surface layer of oxidation. Furthermore, many pre-Columbian cultures, including the Aztec, Inca, and Maya, had advanced metallurgy and were not limited to stone tools.

== See also ==
- Acámbaro figures
- Out-of-place artifact
- Rock art
