= Out-of-place artifact =

Artifacts purported to challenge historical chronology

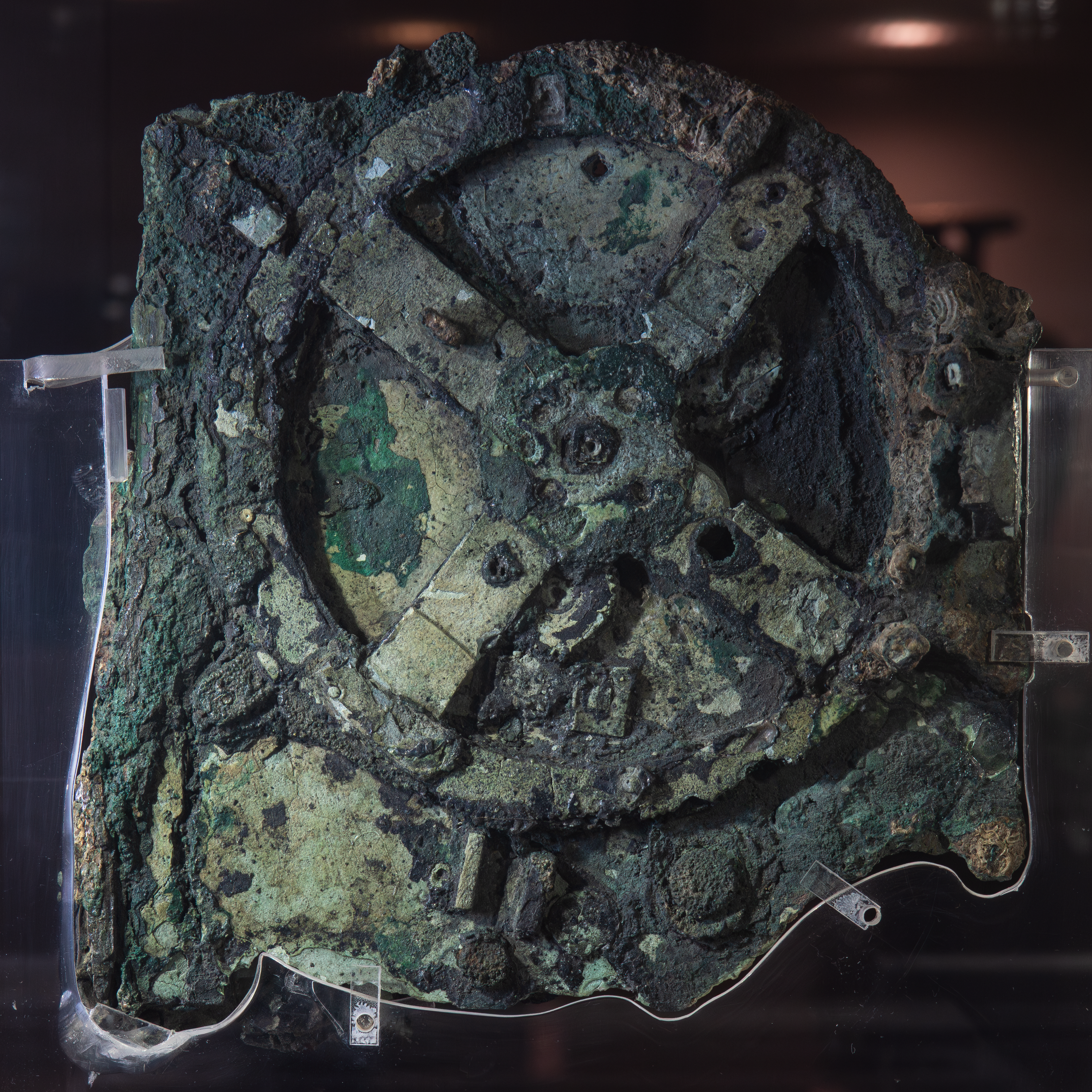
Gear of the Antikythera mechanism, a mechanical computer from the 2nd century BCE showing a previously unknown level of complexity

An out-of-place artifact (OOPArt or oopart) is an artifact of historical, archaeological, or paleontological interest to someone that is claimed to have been found in an unusual context, which someone claims to challenge conventional historical chronology by its presence in that context. Some people might think that those artifacts are too advanced for the technology known to have existed at the time, or that human presence existed at a time before humans are known to have existed. Other people might hypothesize about a contact between different cultures that is hard to account for with conventional historical understanding.

This description of archaeological objects is used in fringe science such as cryptozoology, as well as by proponents of ancient astronaut theories, young Earth creationists, and paranormal enthusiasts. It can describe a wide variety of items, from anomalies studied by mainstream science to pseudoarchaeology to objects that have been shown to be hoaxes or to have conventional explanations.

Critics argue that most purported OOPArts which are not hoaxes are the result of mistaken interpretation, objects being physically moved to another geographical point, or wishful thinking, such as a mistaken belief that a particular culture could not have created an artifact or technology due to a lack of knowledge or materials. In some cases, the uncertainty results from inaccurate descriptions. For example, the cuboid Wolfsegg Iron is not a perfect cube, nor are the Klerksdorp spheres perfect spheres. The Iron pillar of Delhi was said to be "rust proof", but it has some rust near its base; its relative resistance to corrosion is due to slag inclusions left over from the manufacturing conditions and environmental factors.

Supporters of fringe archeology regard OOPArts as evidence that mainstream science is overlooking huge areas of knowledge, either willfully or through ignorance. Many writers or researchers who question conventional views of human history have used purported OOPArts in attempts to bolster their arguments. Creation science often relies on allegedly anomalous finds in the archaeological record to challenge scientific chronologies and models of human evolution. Claimed OOPArts have been used to support religious descriptions of prehistory, ancient astronaut theories, and the notion of vanished civilizations that possessed knowledge or technology more advanced than that known in modern times. Proponents of OOPArts also hint at the existence of an "alternative history" and authors whose works provide such explanations are popular within conspiracy circles.

== Unusual artifacts ==
- Antikythera mechanism: A form of mechanical computer created between 150 and 100 BCE based on theories of astronomy and mathematics believed to have been developed by the ancient Greeks. Its design and workmanship reflect a previously unknown degree of sophistication and engineering.
- Maine penny: An 11th-century Norwegian coin found in a Native American shell midden at the Goddard Site in Brooklin, Maine, United States, which some authors have argued is evidence of direct contact between Vikings and Native Americans in Maine. The coin may not imply actual exploration of Maine by the Vikings, however; mainstream belief is that it was brought to Maine from Labrador or Newfoundland (where Vikings are known to have established colonies as early as the late 10th century) via an extensive northern trade network operated by indigenous peoples. If Vikings did indeed visit Maine, a much greater number and variety of Viking artifacts might be expected in the archaeological record there. Of the nearly 20,000 objects found over a 15-year period at the Goddard Site, the coin was the sole non-native artifact.

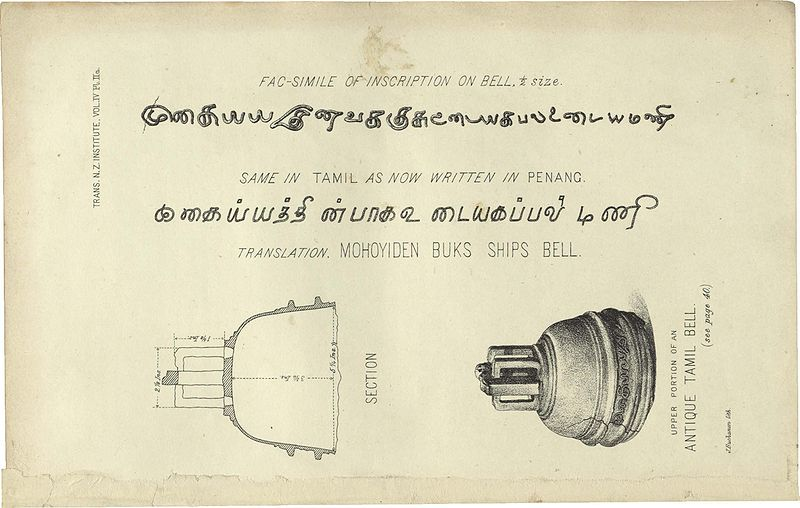
The Tamil Bell is a broken bronze bell used as a cooking pot by Māori women of New Zealand.

- The Tamil bell is a broken bronze bell with an inscription of old Tamil. The bell is a mystery due to its discovery in New Zealand by a missionary. Although nobody knows for certain how the bell came to New Zealand, one possible theory suggests that it was left by Portuguese sailors who had acquired it from Tamil traders. Prior to being discovered by the missionary, local Māori had used it as a cooking pot. Given that it was supposedly discovered generations earlier, the artifact's exact origins could not be identified. The bell is now located at the National Museum of New Zealand.
- Coins from Marchinbar Island: Five coins from the Kilwa Sultanate on the Swahili coast discovered on Marchinbar Island in the Northern Territory of Australia in 1945 alongside four coins from 18th century Netherlands. The inscriptions on the coins identify a ruling Sultan of Kilwa, but it is unclear whether the ruler was from the 10th century or the 14th century. A similar coin, also thought to be from the Medieval Kilwa sultanate, was found in Australia in 2018 in Elcho Island.
- Traces of cocaine and nicotine found in Egyptian mummies, which have been variously interpreted as evidence of contact between Ancient Egypt and Pre-Columbian America or as the result of contamination.

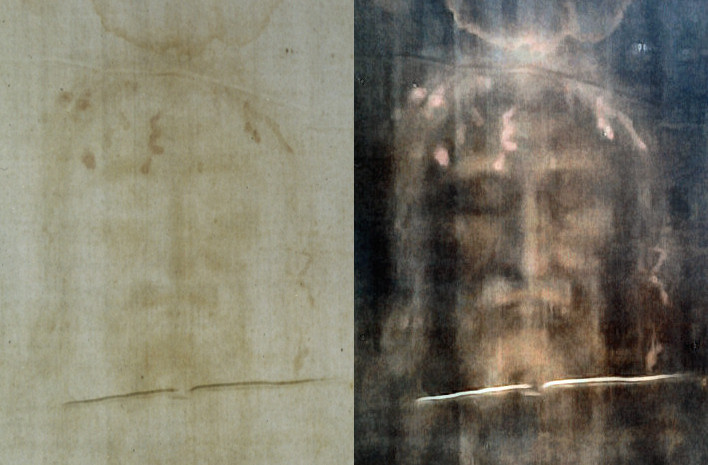
The Shroud of Turin: modern photo of the face, positive left, digitally processed negative image right

- The Shroud of Turin: a cloth traditionally identified as the burial shroud in which Jesus of Nazareth was wrapped after crucifixion. The shroud contains an image that resembles a sepia photographic negative, established by radiocarbon dating to have been produced between the years 1260 and 1390, roughly between 600 to 450 years before the invention of photography. Mention of the shroud first appeared in historical records in 1357. The fact that the image on the shroud is much clearer when it is converted to a positive image was not discovered until Secondo Pia photographed it in 1898. The actual method that resulted in this image has not yet been identified; hypotheses about a medieval proto-photographic process, a rubbing technique, natural chemical processes or some kind of radiation have not convinced many researchers. All hypotheses put forward to challenge the radiocarbon dating have been scientifically refuted, including the medieval repair hypothesis, the bio-contamination hypothesis and the carbon monoxide hypothesis.
- A Native American arrowhead likely originating from Labrador was found at Sandnæs farm in Greenland. This has led to suggestions that the Norse in Greenland continued to trade with mainland North America.

== Fringe interpretations ==
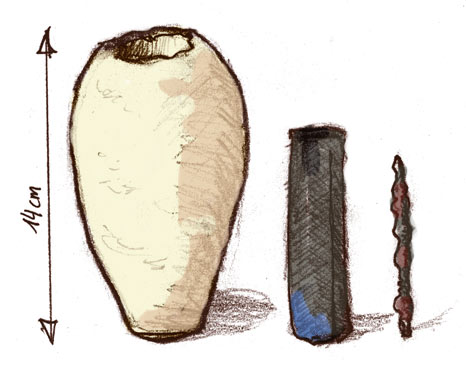
The three components of the Baghdad Battery

- Baghdad Battery: A ceramic vase, a copper tube, and an iron rod made in Parthian or Sassanid Persia, discovered in 1936. Fringe theorists have hypothesized that it may have been used as a galvanic cell for electroplating, though no electroplated artifacts from this era have been found. The "battery" strongly resembles another type of object with a known purpose – storage vessels for sacred scrolls from nearby Seleucia on the Tigris.
- Dorchester Pot: A metal pot claimed to have been blasted out of solid rock in 1852. Mainstream commentators identify it as a Victorian-era candlestick or pipe holder.
- Kingoodie artifact: A Scottish object resembling a corroded nail, said to have been encased in solid rock. It was handled a number of times before being reported and there are no photographs of it.
- Lake Winnipesaukee mystery stone: Originally thought to be a record of a treaty between tribes, subsequent analysis has called its authenticity into question.
- Sivatherium of Kish: An ornamental war chariot figurine discovered in the Sumerian ruins of Kish, in what is now central Iraq, in 1928. The figurine, dated to the Early Dynastic I period (2800–2750 BCE), depicts a quadrupedal mammal with branched horns, a nose ring, and a rope tied to the ring. Because of the shape of the horns, Edwin Colbert identified it in 1936 as a depiction of a late-surviving, possibly domesticated Sivatherium, a vaguely moose-like relative of the giraffe that lived in North Africa and India during the Pleistocene but was believed to have become extinct early in the Holocene extinction event. Henry Field and Berthold Laufer instead argued that it represented a captive Persian fallow deer and that the antlers had broken over the years. The missing antlers were indeed found in the Field Museum's storeroom in 1977. After restoration in 1985, it was conclusively identified as a depiction of a Caspian red deer (Cervus elaphus maral).
- Tecaxic-Calixtlahuaca head: A terracotta offering head seemingly of Roman appearance found beneath three intact floors of a burial site in Mexico and dated between 1476 and 1510. There are disputed claims that its dating is older. Ancient Roman or Norse provenance has not been excluded.
- The Westford Knight: A pattern, variously interpreted as a carving or a natural feature, or a combination of both, located on a glacial boulder in Westford, Massachusetts in the United States. Pseudohistorical interpretations have labeled it as evidence of pre-Columbian contact with Medieval Europe.
- Nimrud lens; 8th-century BCE piece of rock crystal which was unearthed in 1850 by Austen Henry Layard at the Assyrian palace of Nimrud in modern-day Iraq. which may have been used as a magnifying glass or as a burning-glass to start fires by concentrating sunlight, or it may have been a piece of decorative inlay. Giovanni Pettinato speculated that it may have been a telescope, although experts remained unconvinced.
- Sabu disk: a disk of notable precision apparently from ancient times in Saqqara. Its purpose is unknown. It has been described as an out-of-place artifact by fringe theorists.

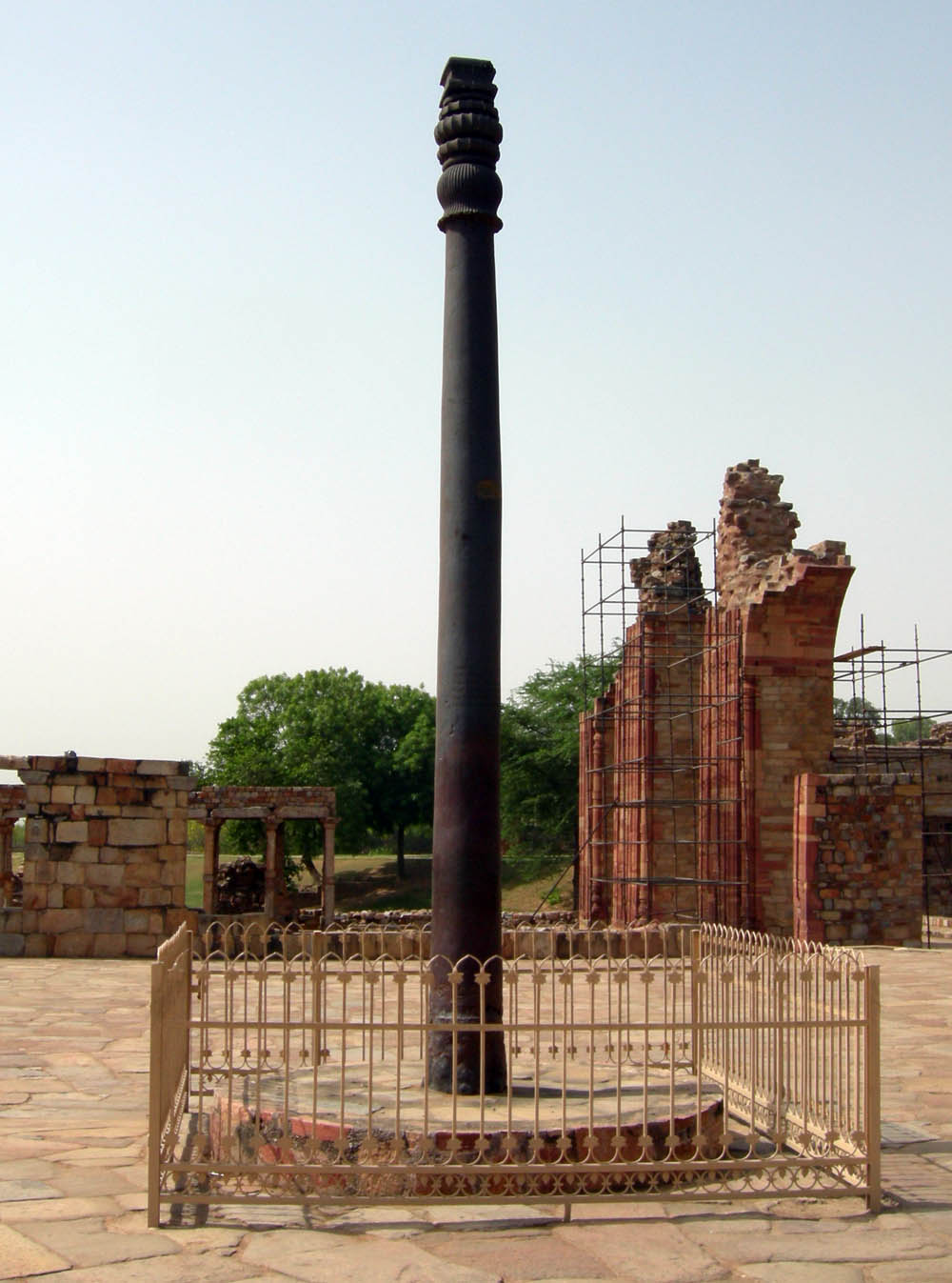
The iron pillar of Delhi

- Abydos helicopter: A pareidolia based on palimpsest carving in an ancient Egyptian temple.
- Dendera Lamps: Supposed to depict light bulbs, but made in Ptolemaic Egypt, debunked by the analysis of the epigraphic text. The motif actually represents a lotus flower.
- Iron Man (Eiserner Mann): An old iron pillar, said to be a unique oddity in Germany, but consistent with medieval methods of ironworking.
- Iron pillar of Delhi: A "rust-proof" iron pillar which supposedly demonstrates more advanced metallurgy than was available in India before 1000 CE.
- London Hammer: Also known as the "London Artifact", a hammer made of iron and wood that was found in London, Texas, in 1936. Part of the hammer is encased in "400-million-year-old" ("Ordovician era") rock. In 1985, anthropologist John R. Cole hypothesized that the stone surrounding the hammer is a recent carbonate soil concretion.
- Meister Print: A supposed human footprint from the Cambrian period, long before humans existed, which has been debunked as the result of a natural geologic process known as spall formation.
- Pacal's sarcophagus lid: Described by Erich von Däniken as a depiction of a spaceship's cockpit.
- Piri Reis map: Several authors, such as pseudohistorian Gavin Menzies and pseudoscientist Charles Hapgood, have suggested that this map, compiled by the Turkish admiral Piri Reis, showed Antarctica long before it was discovered (cf. Terra Australis).
- Quimbaya airplanes: Golden objects found in Colombia and made by the Quimbaya civilization, which have been alleged to represent modern airplanes. In the Gold Museum, Bogotá, they are described as figures of birds and insects. Some of the artifacts have also been debunked as forgeries.
- Saqqara Bird: Supposedly depicts a glider, but made in Ancient Egypt.
- Shakōkidogū: Small humanoid and animal figurines made during the late Jōmon period (14,000–400 BCE) of prehistoric Japan, said to resemble extraterrestrial astronauts.
- Stone spheres of Costa Rica: Inaccurately described as being perfectly spherical, and therefore demonstrating greater stone-working skill in pre-Columbian times than has previously been known.
- Fuente Magna, a large stone vessel that was discovered in Bolivia in 1950, with many engravings on its inside that have been compared to Sumerian cuneiform writing. Archeologist and historian of the Near East Alexander H. Joffe has described the patterns as "geometric filler or deliberate gibberish" and thought the face on the interior resembles local Tiwanaku culture. He suggested it could be a fake or a local oddity.

== Natural objects mistaken for artifacts ==
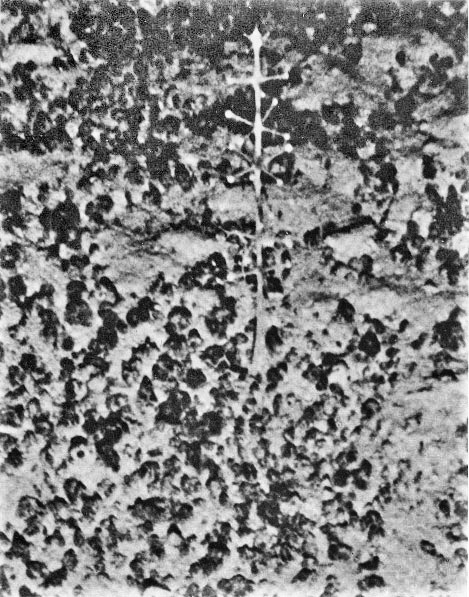
Eltanin Antenna

- Aix-en-Provence petrified tools: Likely petrified tree remains.
- Ararat anomaly: The Ararat anomaly is a structure appearing on photographs of the snowfields near the summit of Mount Ararat, Turkey, initially believed by some Christian believers to be the remains of Noah's Ark. Located on the northwest corner of the Western Plateau of Mount Ararat, approximately 15,500 ft high, it was first filmed during a U.S. Air Force aerial reconnaissance mission in 1949. The Defense Intelligence Agency later indicated that the anomaly represents linear facades in the glacial ice, rather than an ancient structure.
- Baigong pipes: Their natural origins have been challenged.
- Baltic Sea anomaly: Natural geological formation purported to be a sunken UFO due to its unusual shape.
- Bosnian pyramid complex: Unproven claim that there is a pyramid complex in the vicinity of town of Visoko in Bosnia, made by ancient Bosnians.
- Eltanin Antenna: Actually a sponge.
- Eoliths: Miocene knapped flint nodules mistaken in the 19th century for extremely primitive stone tools, which helped back the authenticity of Piltdown Man.
- Face on Mars: A pareidolia of a rock formation on Mars caused by the poor resolution of early orbital photography of the planet.
- Klerksdorp spheres: Actually pre-Cambrian concretions.
- Gunung Padang pyramid: megalithic site built on the slopes of an ancient volcano which has been misidentified as a 20,000 year old pyramid.
- Paluxy River tracks: Identified as giant humanoid footprints found alongside dinosaur tracks. Actually tracks of theropod dinosaurs, and 1930s forgeries.
- Yonaguni Monument: An unusual underwater rock formation near the southern Ryukyu Islands. Was considered a man-made monolith because of the even cracks.

== Erroneously dated objects ==
- Aiud object: An aluminum wedge found in 1974 in the Mureș River in central Romania, near the town of Aiud; it has been claimed by Romanian ufologists to be of ancient and/or extraterrestrial origin, yet it is more likely a fragment of modern machinery lost during excavation work.
- Coso artifact: Claimed to be prehistoric; actually a 1920s spark plug that had become encased in a concretion.
- Malachite Man: Thought to be from the early Cretaceous; actually a post-Columbian burial.
- Nampa figurine: Was a clay fired doll found in Nampa, Idaho during a well drilling. Early dating attempts believed the artifact to be 2 million years old due to the rock layer it was found in. Later assessments found that the artifact was either only a few thousand years old or a 19th-century Native American doll. Many have criticized the object as a likely hoax.
- Wolfsegg Iron: Thought to be from the Tertiary period; actually from an early mining operation. Inaccurately described as a perfect cube.

== Modern-day creations, forgeries and hoaxes ==
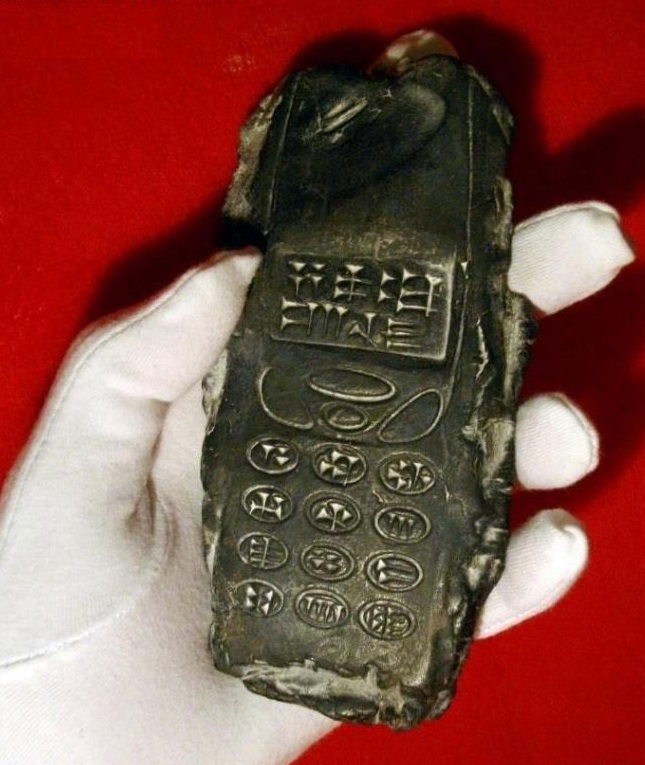
Babylonokia

- Babylonokia: A clay tablet shaped like a mobile phone and created as an artwork in 2012. Fringe scientists and alternative archaeology proponents subsequently misrepresented a photograph of the artwork as showing an 800-year-old archaeological find. The story was popularised in a video on the YouTube channel Paranormal Crucible and led to the object being reported by some press sources as a mystery.
- Acámbaro figures: Mid-20th-century figurines of dinosaurs, attributed by Waldemar Julsrud to an ancient society.
- Calaveras Skull: A human skull found by miners in Calaveras County, California, which was purported to prove that humans, mastodons, and elephants had coexisted in prehistoric California. It was later revealed to be a hoax.
- Cardiff Giant: A 19th-century hoax of a ten-foot-tall supposedly petrified man exhibited as a giant from biblical times. Quickly debunked by experts, and by the confession of the forger, it was nonetheless a popular marvel of the day.
- Crystal skulls: Supposedly demonstrate more advanced stone-cutting skill than was previously known from pre-Columbian Mesoamerica. Appear to have been made in the 19th century.
- Gosford Glyphs: A collection of Egyptian hieroglyphs on the Central Coast, Australia, that have been dismissed as a hoax by authorities and academics after their discovery in the 1970s.
- Ica stones: Depict Inca dinosaur-hunters, surgery, and other modern or fanciful topics. Collected by Javier Cabrera Darquea, who claimed them to be prehistoric. Later revealed to be a forgery created by a local farmer.
- Japanese Paleolithic hoax: Perpetrated by discredited amateur archaeologist Shinichi Fujimura.
- Kensington Runestone: A runestone purportedly unearthed in 1898 in Kensington, Minnesota entangled in the roots of a tree. Runologists have dismissed the inscription's authenticity on linguistic evidence, while geologists disagree as to whether the stone shows weathering that would indicate a medieval date.
- Los Lunas Decalogue Stone: Supposedly made by pre-Columbian Israelite visitors to the Americas. Generally believed to be a modern-day hoax.
- Michigan relics: Supposedly ancient artifacts which have been alleged as proof that people of an ancient Near Eastern culture had lived in the U.S. state of Michigan; they are archaeological forgeries.
- Newark Holy Stones: Hoax "artifacts" used as extremely unlikely evidence that Hebrew peoples lived in the Precolumbian Americas.
- Piltdown Man: Supposedly skull parts from a "missing link" hominid, but exposed as an elaborate hoax 41 years after its "discovery".
- Tucson artifacts: Thirty-one lead objects that Charles E. Manier and his family found in 1924 near Picture Rocks, Arizona, which were initially thought by some to be created by early Mediterranean civilizations that had crossed the Atlantic in the first century, but were later determined to be a hoax.
- Two arrowheads from South Shetland Islands: Planted to convince scientists that indigenous peoples of the Americas once crossed the Drake Passage.

== See also ==
- Acheiropoieta
- Anachronism
- Ancient technology
- Apophenia
- Geofact
- Lazarus taxon
- Lost inventions
- Manuport
- Philosophy of conspiracy theories
- Pseudohistory
- Silurian hypothesis

=== Authors, researchers and works ===
- Carlo Crespi Croci
- Charles Fort, researcher of anomalous phenomena
- Chariots of the Gods?, 1968 book by Erich Von Daniken
- Fortean Times
- Peter Kolosimo
- Fingerprints of the Gods, 1995 book by Graham Hancock
- Vadim Chernobrov, researcher of anomalous phenomena and writer
- Michael Cremo, author of several books including Forbidden Archeology (1993)
- Charles Berlitz, linguist and writer of anomalous phenomena
- The Mysterious Origins of Man, originally aired on NBC in 1996
