= Lake Winnipesaukee mystery stone =

Stone artifact discovered in 1872 in New Hampshire, USA

Coordinates: 43°12′25″N 71°32′08″W

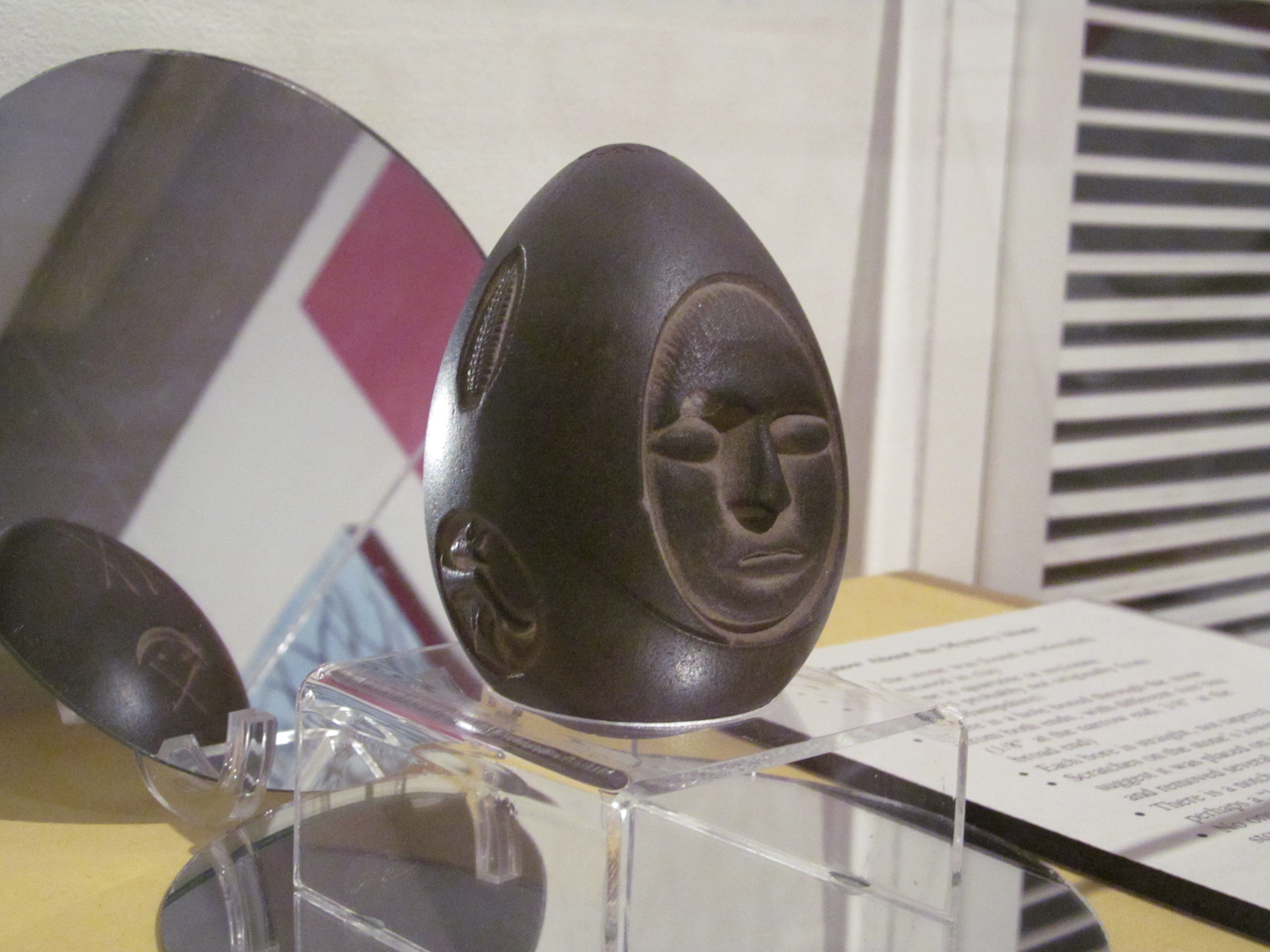
Lake Winnipesaukee mystery stone at the New Hampshire Historical Society

The Lake Winnipesaukee mystery stone is an alleged out-of-place artifact (OOPArt) found in a town near Lake Winnipesaukee in New Hampshire. The stone's age, purpose and origin are unknown.

The stone is about 4 inches (100 mm) long and 2.5 inches (64 mm) thick, dark and egg-shaped, bearing a variety of carved symbols, including a face. Carvings on one side of the stone show an ear of corn and several other figures. The other side is more abstract, featuring inverted arrows, a moon shape, some dots and a spiral.

A hole goes through the stone from top to bottom, seemingly bored from both ends with different size bits (1/8 inch (3.2 mm) at the top and 3/8 inch (9.5 mm) at the bottom).

== History ==
The stone was reportedly found in 1872 in Meredith, New Hampshire, by workers digging a hole for a fence post. Seneca Ladd, a Meredith businessman who hired the workers, was given credit for the discovery. In 1892, upon Ladd's death, the stone passed to Frances Ladd Coe of Center Harbor, one of his daughters. In 1927, she donated the stone to the New Hampshire Historical Society.

The stone is currently on exhibit at the Museum of New Hampshire History.

== Analysis and interpretation ==
A contemporary source suggested that the stone "commemorates a treaty between two tribes". Another writer later suggested that it is a thunderstone. With the somewhat limited understanding of the day, the letter said that thunderstones "always present the appearance of having been machined or hand-worked: frequently they come from deep in the earth, embedded in lumps of clay, or even surrounded by solid rock or coral".

A recent theory stated that it could be a lodestone - a stone often used as an alternative to a compass during the 16th century. However, this would require it to be made of magnetite, while recent analysis determined it originated from quartzite.

In 1994, a borescope analysis of the stone's holes was performed. State archaeologist Richard Boisvert later suggested that the holes had the appearance of having been drilled by power tools from the 19th or 20th century:

I've seen a number of holes bored in stone with technology that you would associate with prehistoric North America. There's a certain amount of unevenness ... and this hole was extremely regular throughout. What we did not see was variations that would be consistent with something that was several hundred years old.

In Boisvert's findings, he also acknowledged that the carvings could have been made by hand, tools, or even dental tools.

Scratches in the lower bore suggest it was placed on a metal shaft and removed several times.

Analysis has concluded the stone is a type of quartzite. A metamorphic stone that is not native, nor found in New Hampshire, however its origin there may not be ruled out.

All of this evidence gives weight to another theory, that the mystery stone of Lake Winnipesaukee was a hoax, a stone fabricated to have historical significance. However, motive and reward for this hoax are not clear as no individual received money nor notoriety after its discovery.
