= Acámbaro figures =

Figurines allegedly found by Waldemar Julsrud in 1944

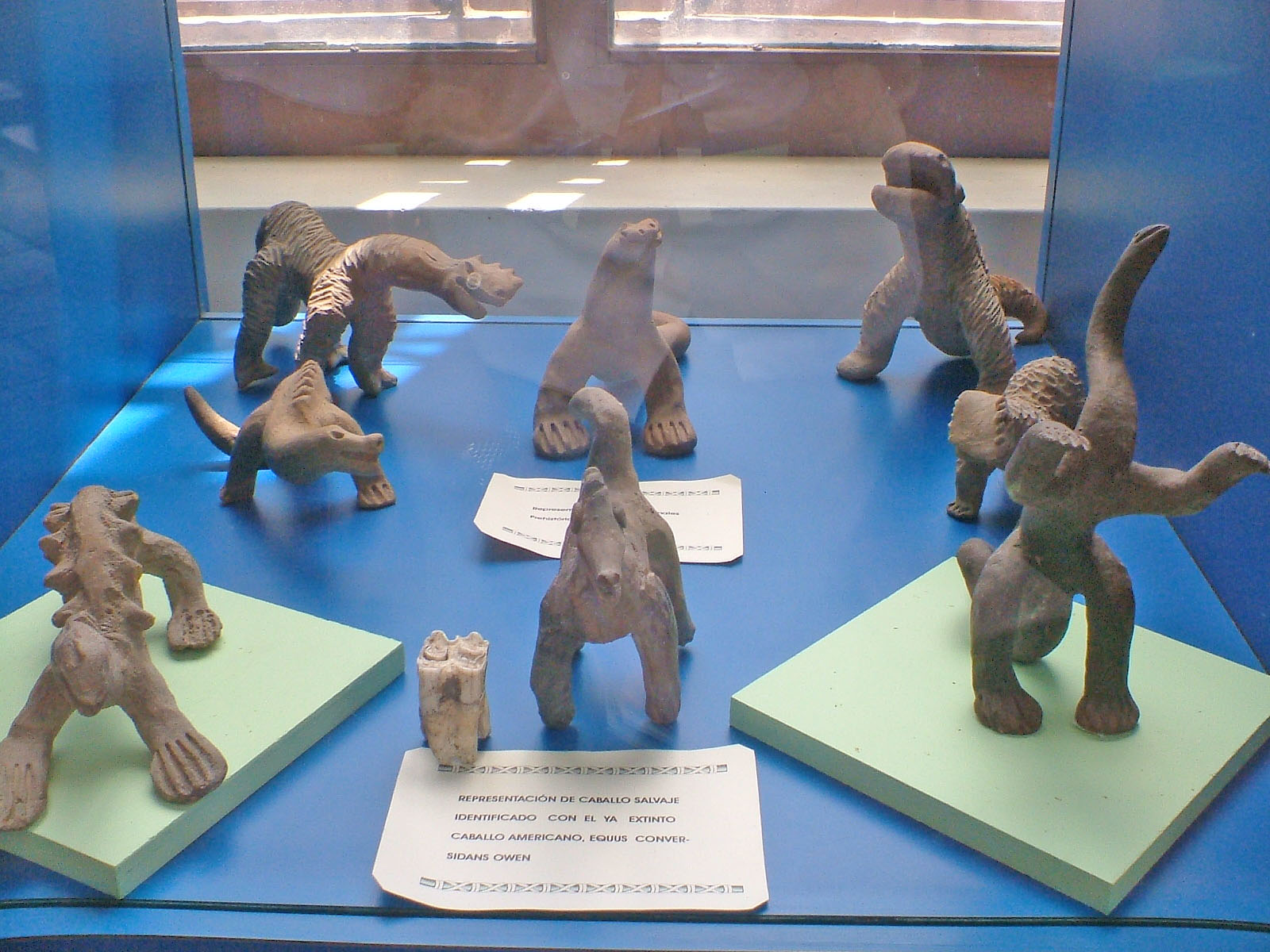
The figures

The Acámbaro figures are about 33,000 small ceramic figurines allegedly found by Waldemar Julsrud in July 1944, in the Mexican city of Acámbaro, Guanajuato. The figurines are said by some to resemble dinosaurs and are sometimes cited as anachronisms. Some young-Earth creationists have adduced the existence of figurines as credible evidence for the coexistence of dinosaurs and humans, in an attempt to cast doubt on scientific dating methods and potentially offer support for a literal interpretation of the Genesis creation narrative.

However, there is no known reliable evidence for the validity of the Acámbaro figures as actual ancient artifacts; and many have questioned the motives of those who argue for their validity.

== History ==
External videos
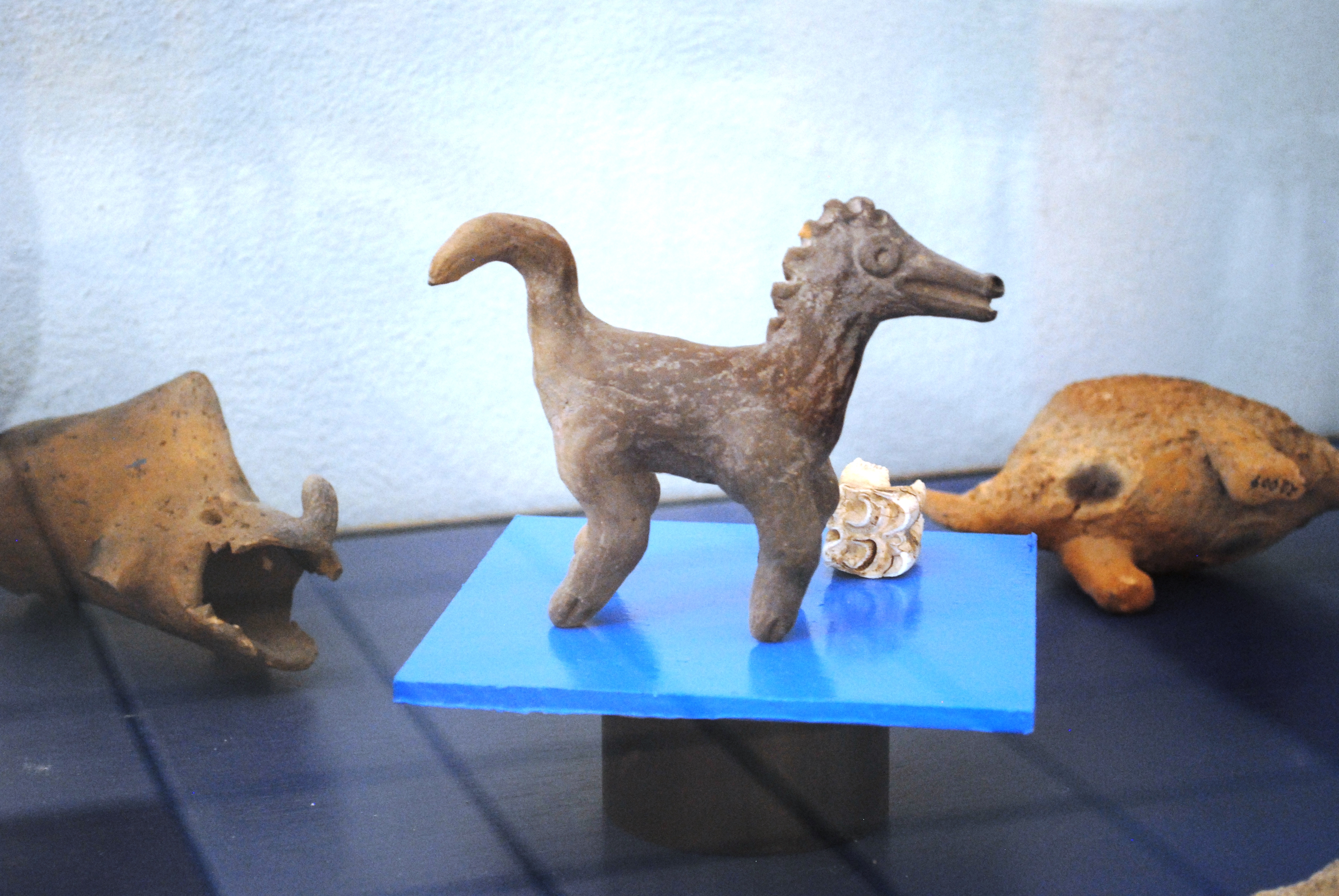
- What in the World – The Disputed Pottery Collection of Waldemar Julsrud, 10:53, Penn Museum

The Acámbaro figures were uncovered by a German immigrant and hardware merchant named Waldemar Julsrud. According to Dennis Swift, a young-Earth creationist and major proponent of the figures' authenticity, Julsrud stumbled upon the figures while riding his horse and hired a local farmer to dig up the remaining figures, paying him for each figure he brought back. Eventually, the farmer and his assistants brought him over 32,000 figures which included representations of everything from the supposed dinosaurs to peoples from all over the world including Egyptians, Sumerians, and "bearded Caucasians".

Archaeologist Charles C. Di Peso was working for the Amerind Foundation, an anthropological organization dedicated to preserving Native American culture. Di Peso examined the figures and determined that they were not authentic, and had instead been produced by local modern-day farmers.

He concluded that the figurines were indeed fakes: their surfaces displayed no signs of age; no dirt was packed into their crevices; and though some figurines were broken, no pieces were missing and no broken surfaces were worn. Furthermore, the excavation’s stratigraphy clearly showed that the artifacts were placed in a recently dug hole filled with a mixture of the surrounding archaeological layers. DiPeso also learned that a local family had been making and selling these figurines to Julsrud for a peso apiece since 1944, presumably inspired by films shown at Acámbaro’s cinema, locally available comic books and newspapers, and accessible day trips to Mexico City’s Museo Nacional.

Charles Hapgood, pioneer of pole shift theory, became one of the figures' most high profile and devout supporters.

The figures continue to draw attention in the present day. They have been cited in some pseudoscientific books such as Atlantis Rising by David Lewis. Another young-Earth creationist, Don Patton, has emerged as one of their staunchest supporters. He has proposed some new lines of evidence, including the figure's resemblance to the dinosaurs depicted in Robert Bakker’s book, Dinosaur Heresies.

In 1970, Erle Stanley Gardner published his last travel book, Host With the Big Hat with a chapter on the collection. His biographer Dorothy B. Hughes wrote that "the story of Acámbaro may be the crowning achievement of his archeological investigations".

== Dating ==
Attempts have been made to date the figures using thermoluminescence (TL) dating. The earliest results, from tests done when TL dating was in its infancy, suggested a date around 2500 BC. However, later tests contradicted these findings. In 1976, Gary W. Carriveau and Mark C. Han attempted to date twenty Acámbaro figures using TL dating. They found that the figures had been fired at temperatures between 450 and 650 °C (842 and 1,202 °F), which contradicted claims that these figures had been fired at temperatures too low for them to be accurately dated. However, all of the samples failed the "plateau test", which indicated that dates obtained for the Acámbaro figures using standard high-temperature TL dating techniques were unreliable and lacked any chronological significance. Based on the degree of signal regeneration found in remeasured samples, they estimated that the figures tested had been fired approximately 30 years prior to 1969. The date estimate as well as the notion the artifacts were made by some undiscovered culture was rejected by archeologists and paleontologists.

== See also ==
- Ica stones
- Out-of-place artifact
