= Eiserner Mann =

Iron pillar

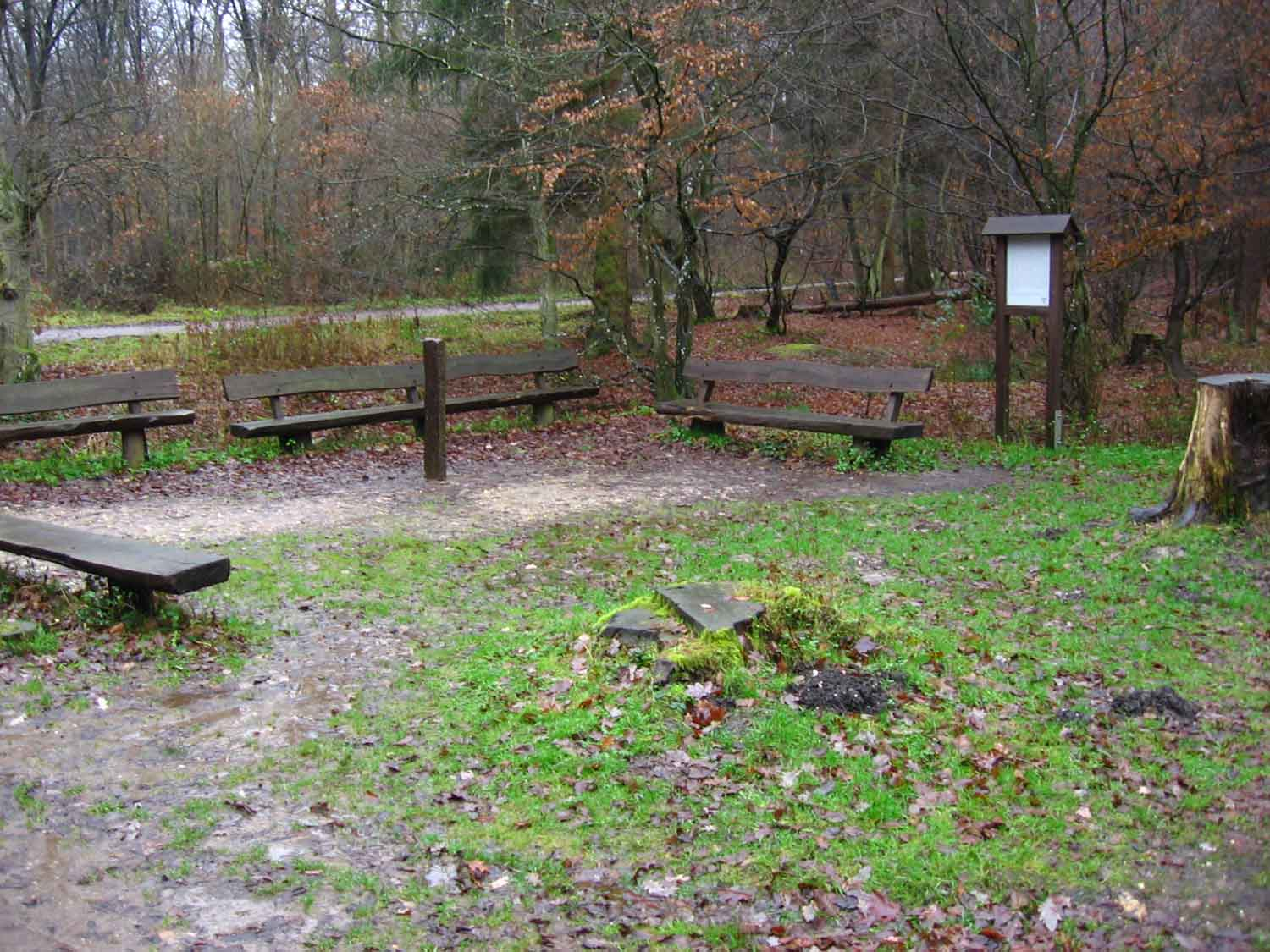
Iron Man surroundings

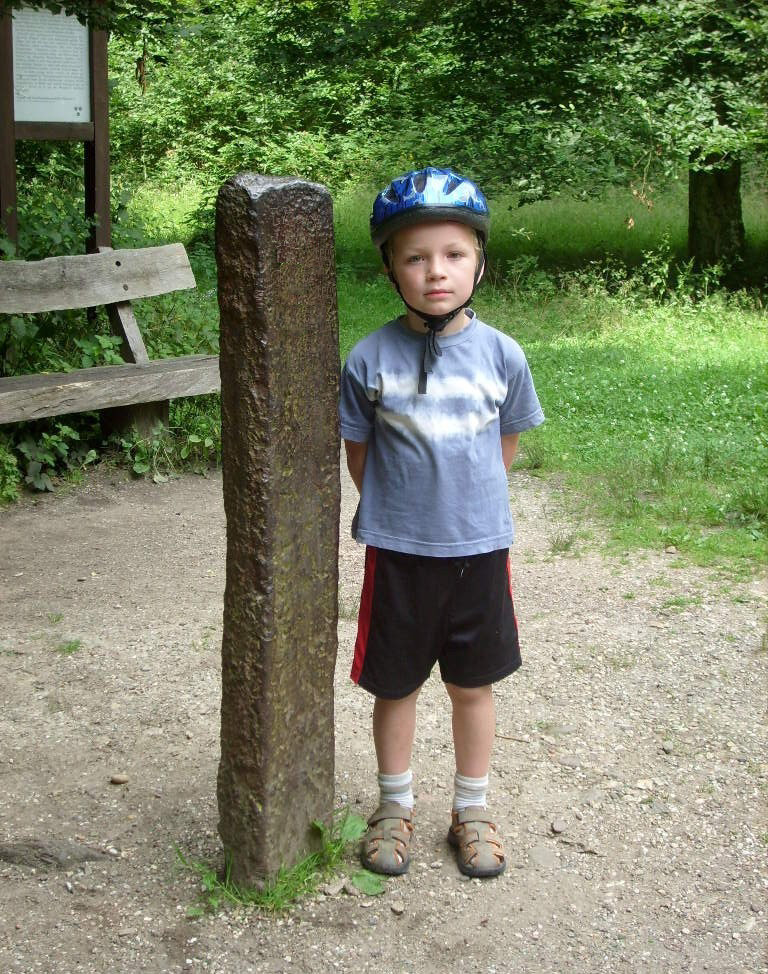
Size comparison

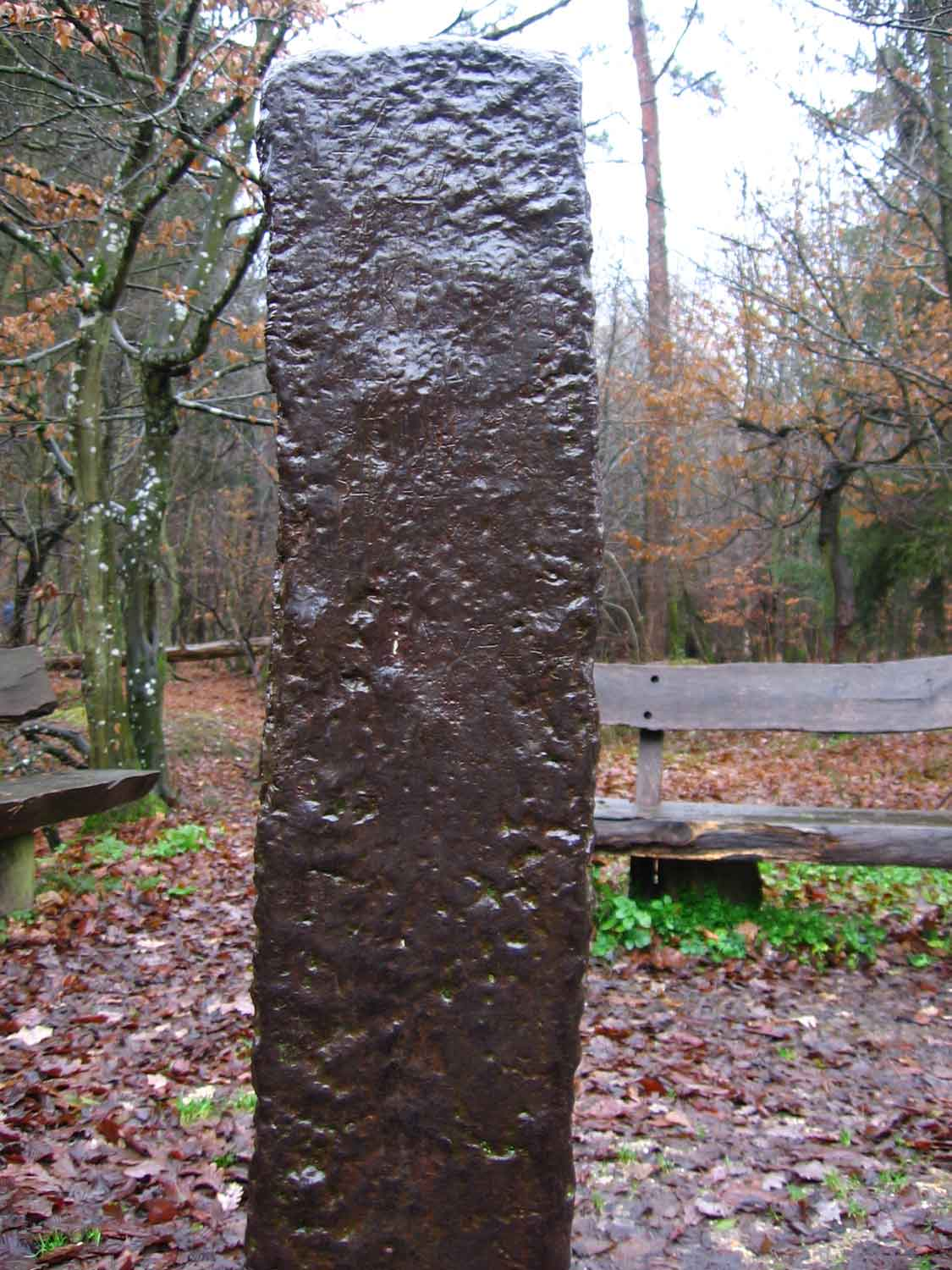
Iron Man closeup

Der Eiserne Mann (The Iron Man) is an old iron pillar partially buried in the ground in the German national forest of Kottenforst-Ville Nature Park, about two kilometers north-east of the village Dünstekoven. It is a roughly rectangular metal bar with about 1.2 m above ground and approximately 1.0 m below ground. The pillar is currently located at a meeting of trails which were built in the early 18th century through the formerly pathless forest area, but it is believed to have stood in another nearby location before that time.

The pillar is a unique oddity in Central Europe, and is alleged by some to be an out-of-place artifact. It was first mentioned in a 17th-century document, where it was used as a village boundary marker. There are some old aqueducts in the vicinity along with an ancient stone walkway.

A metallurgical investigation in the 1970s showed that the pillar is made of pig iron. It was poured into an earthen trench, consistent with medieval methods of ironworking.

After the long exposure to the weather, the iron man shows signs of weathering but there is remarkably little trace of rust. It is located at 50.70757° N by 6.96105° E at an elevation of approximately 159 m.

== Sign content ==
The pillar is marked with a sign reading, in translation:

The Iron Man is a piece of a poured pig iron ingot. It is approximately 2.18 meters long and about 1 meter of its T-shaped end is in the ground. This was apparently intended as an attachment point for transport and processing and has until now, as an anchoring point, prevented any attempt at removing the ingot by force. Its porous surface and the uneven cross-section over its whole length are caused by the sandbed pouring technique. The technique and the form point to a date of manufacture in the late Middle Ages. Origin and original purpose of the Iron Man have not been explained satisfactorily. It has always been surrounded by numerous tales and legends as well as pertinent and also obscure speculation. It was first mentioned in a document in 1625 as part of the border line between Alfter and Heimerzheim along the Roman aqueduct. According to a later source, it still fulfilled this function in 1717. Its former position can not be located accurately any more. It was not until 1727, under Prince Elector Clemens, that the Iron Man was placed in its present position. It served as a marker of the main planning line while expanding the system of paths for hunting between Augustsburg Palace in Brühl and Herzogsfreude Palace in Röttgen. Today it is a popular meeting point among hikers.

— Heimat- und Verschönerungsverein Buschhoven e. V. Quelle: K. Grewe, Der Eiserne Mann im Kottenforst, Cologne, 1978

== See also ==
- Iron Pillar of Delhi
