= Sabu disk =

Ancient Egyptian stone artifact

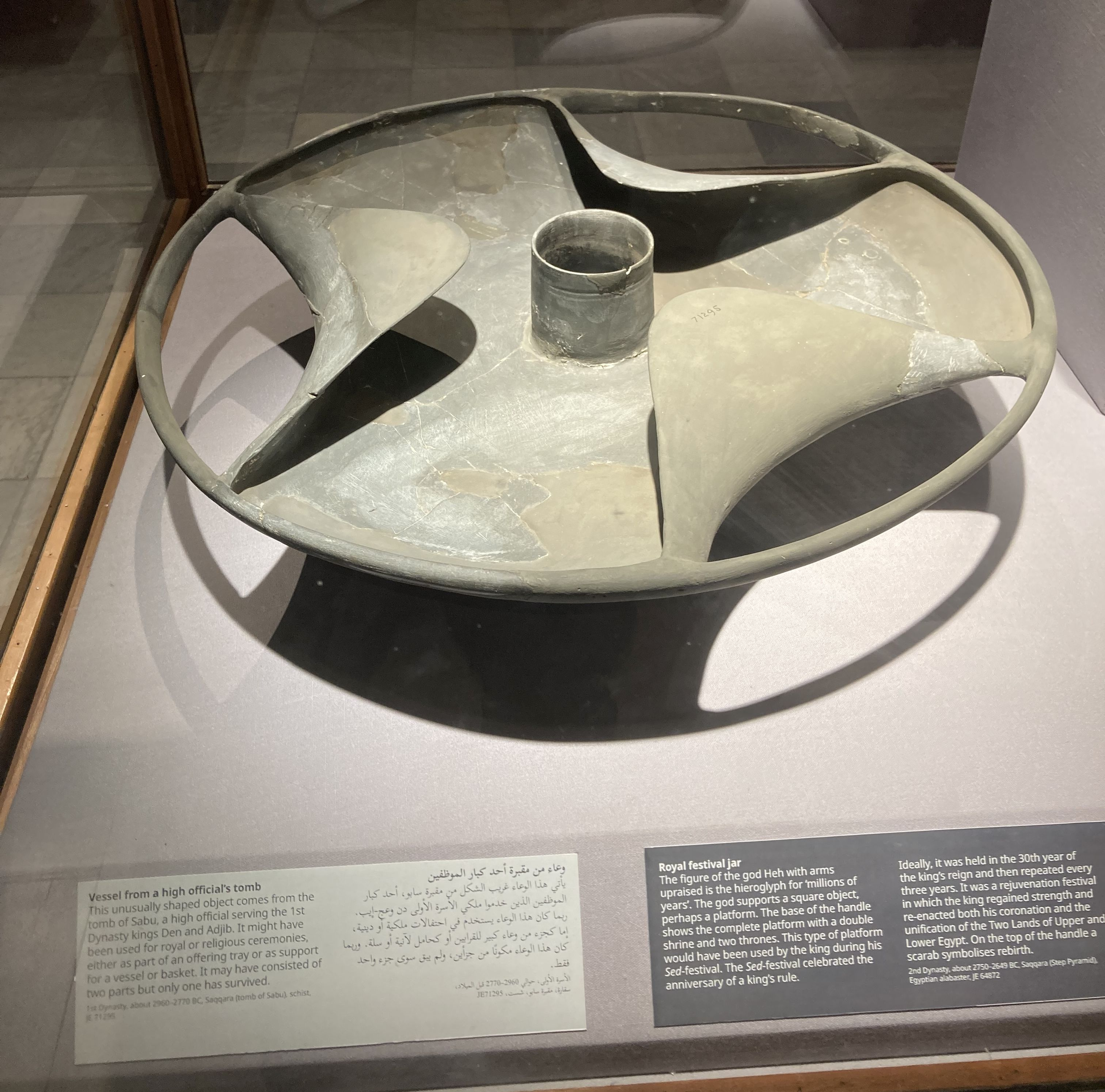
- Material: Siltstone
- Height: 10.6 cm (4.2 in)
- Width: 61 cm (24 in)
- Created: c. 3000 to 2800 BC
- Discovered: 19 January 1936; Badrashin, Giza, Egypt
- Discovered by: Walter Emery
- Present location: Cairo, Cairo Governorate, Egypt

Line drawing of the Sabu disk: overhead view (top) and side view (bottom). The side view is divided into an external view (left) and a cross section through the center (right); after Emery (1949)

The Sabu disk is an ancient Egyptian artifact from the First Dynasty, c. 3000 to 2800 BC. It was found by Walter Emery in 1936 in the north of the Saqqara necropolis in mastaba S3111, the grave of the ancient Egyptian official Sabu after whom it is named. The function and meaning of the carefully crafted stone vessel are unclear.

== Description ==
The artifact is made of weakly metamorphic siltstone, and is in the shape of a shallow bowl with a diameter of 61 centimetres (24 in) and a maximum height of 10.6 cm (4.2 in). Its central hole has a diameter of about 8 cm (3.1 in), which is fitted with a socket whose height corresponds approximately to the depth of the bowl. From the slightly raised outer edge, three wings or lobes are folded inwards towards the central hole, with the outer edge remaining in the form of narrow arches that connect the non-folded parts with each other. When viewed from above, it therefore resembles a steering wheel with three very wide spokes.

== History ==
Sabu's grave was discovered on January 19, 1936, by the British archaeologist Walter Bryan Emery. It is a mastaba tomb that consists of seven chambers. In Room E, the central burial chamber, the disk was found in a central location right next to Sabu's skeleton, which was originally buried in a wooden coffin. The slate object was broken into several fragments and was later restored. It is currently on display at the Egyptian Museum in Cairo. A copy of the artifact is on display at the Orient Pavilion of Jungfrau Park, founded by Erich von Däniken.

Discoveries of large flat stone bowls from the First to Third Dynasties are generally not uncommon. During this period of Ancient Egypt, the production of stone objects generally peaked, and several high-quality slate objects of similar origin were found in Saqqara. However, due to its design the disk is considered a unique piece in Egyptology.

== Interpretation ==
The discoverer Emery tentatively interpreted the artifact as a vessel placed on a stand because of the central hole, but no remains of such were found. However, it should be taken into account that mastaba S3111 was not untouched when Emery discovered it, but like many other ancient Egyptian tombs had been looted by grave robbers centuries before. Since the production of a metal object shaped like the Sabu disk would be easy, but very complex if it were made from easily splintered rock, it has been assumed that the disk may have been an imitation of a metal object. Early reports of the discovery dubbed the find a "mysterious vessel" and speculated that it may have been a gigantic lamp. In popular and unscientific publications, an English engineer named William Kay is quoted as having further developed this hypothesis. According to him, the bowl was used as a three-flame oil lamp during ritual activities and was placed on a holder for this purpose. Another hypothesis states that the bowl could only have served a decorative purpose because of its fragility.

In Egyptology, apart from the brief reports mentioned, there was no extensive discussion of the disk and its function. Some ancient astronaut fringe theorists believe the object is an out-of-place artifact, i.e. an object that was found in a place where it "does not belong". According to this theory, the significance of the disk can be recognized, besides its unique form, by the fact that it was placed in the center of the burial chamber, and not Sabu's remains.

At the Airbus research center, copies of the disk were made using a 3D printer and the physical properties of the disk were examined. The copies had aerodynamic properties, and could serve as flying disks. However, due to their rotational symmetry (or non-chirality), use as a propeller or turbine is impossible. It was also shown that it was possible to use the disk as an oil lamp.
