= Wolfsegg Iron =

Piece of iron interpreted by some as an out of place artefact

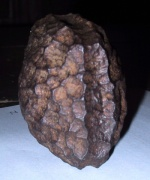
The Wolfsegg Iron

The Wolfsegg Iron, also known as the Salzburg Cube, is a small cuboid mass of iron that was found buried in Tertiary lignite in Wolfsegg am Hausruck, Austria, in 1885. It weighs 785 grams (1 lb 12 oz) and measures 67 mm × 67 mm × 47 mm (2¾" x 2¾" x 1¾"). Four of its sides are roughly flat, while the two remaining sides (opposite each other) are convex. A fairly deep groove is incised all the way around the object, about mid-way up its height.

The Wolfsegg Iron became notable when it was claimed to be an out-of-place artifact: a worked iron cube found buried in a 20-million-year-old coal seam. It was originally identified by scientists as being of meteoric origin.

== History ==
Early descriptions of the object appeared in contemporary editions of the scientific journals Nature and L'Astronomie, the object identified by scientists as being a fossil meteorite. It was reported that the object was discovered when a workman at the Braun iron foundry in Schöndorf, Austria, was breaking up a block of lignite that had been mined at Wolfsegg. In 1886, mining engineer Adolf Gurlt reported on the object to the Natural History Society of Bonn, noting that the object was coated with a thin layer of rust, was made of iron, and had a specific gravity of 7.75.

A plaster cast was made of the object shortly before the end of the 19th century, as the original had suffered from being handled, and had had samples cut from it by researchers.

== Out-of-place artifact ==
The Wolfsegg Iron is claimed by some as an out-of-place artifact (OOPArt), and it is often stated as a fact in paranormal literature that it disappeared without trace in 1910, from the Salzburg Museum. In fact, as mentioned, it is at the Heimathaus Museum in Vöcklabruck, Austria, which is where the photo was taken. It has also erroneously been described as "a perfectly machined steel cube".
