= Helicopter hieroglyphs =

Egyptian palimpsest inscription misinterpreted as depicting a helicopter

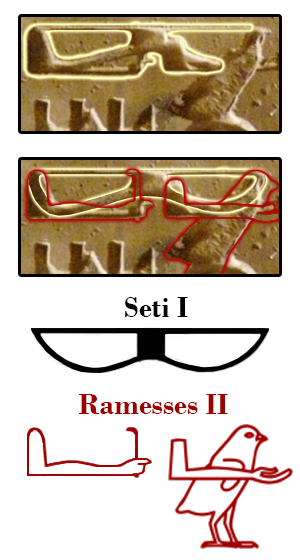
The "helicopter", and the real hieroglyphs of Seti I and Ramesses II

The helicopter hieroglyphs is a name given to part of an Egyptian hieroglyph carving from the Temple of Seti I at Abydos. It is a palimpsest relief with two overlapping inscriptions, the titles of Ramesses II superimposed on those of his father and predecessor Seti I. They have been wrongly interpreted as an out-of-place artifact depicting a helicopter and other examples of advanced technology, in pseudo-scientific ancient astronaut circles.

The "helicopter", a product of pareidolia, is made up of a bow hieroglyph of Seti I, and two arm hieroglyphs of Ramesses II.

== Translation ==
The initial carving was made during the reign of Seti I (c. 1294–1279 BC) and translates to:

Powerful of scimitar, who suppresses the nine bows (enemies of Egypt), [...], Menmaatra (throne name of Seti I)

Ramesses II (c. 1279–1213 BC), Seti's successor, had the hieroglyphs filled in with plaster and re-carved the inscription to:

Two Ladies: protector of Egypt, who repels foreign lands, [...], Usermaatra-Setepenre (throne name of Ramesses II)

Over time, the plaster has eroded away, leaving both inscriptions partially visible, creating a palimpsest-like effect of overlapping hieroglyphs.

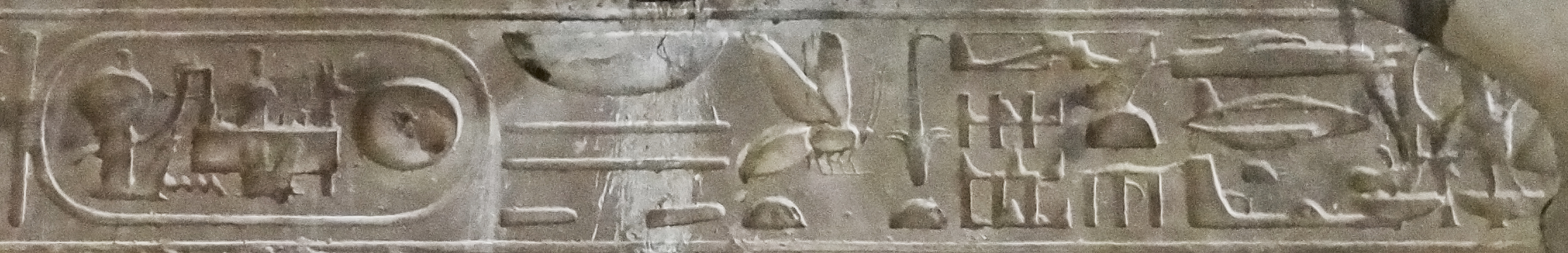
The hieroglyphs on an architrave in the Temple of Seti I at Abydos (read from right to left). The names of Seti I and Ramesses II are overlaid in the same cartouche.

== See also ==
- Ancient astronauts
- Annunaki
- Dendera light

== Sources ==
- Brand, Peter J. (2023). Ramesses II, Egypt's Ultimate Pharaoh. Lockwood Press. pp. 82–85, 108. ISBN 9781948488495.
