= Ocucaje District =

Coordinates: 14.3471°S 75.6718°W

Ocucaje
- District
- Interactive map of Ocucaje
- Country: Peru
- Region: Ica
- Province: Ica
- Founded: May 18, 1984
- Capital: Ocucaje

Government
  - Mayor: Luis Aldo Guevara Uchuya

Area
  - Total: 1,417.24 km^{2} (547.20 sq mi)
- Elevation: 325 m (1,066 ft)

Population (2005 census)
  - Total: 3,496
  - Density: 2.467/km^{2} (6.389/sq mi)
- Time zone: UTC-5 (PET)
- UBIGEO: 110104

Ocucaje District is one of fourteen districts of the province Ica in Peru.

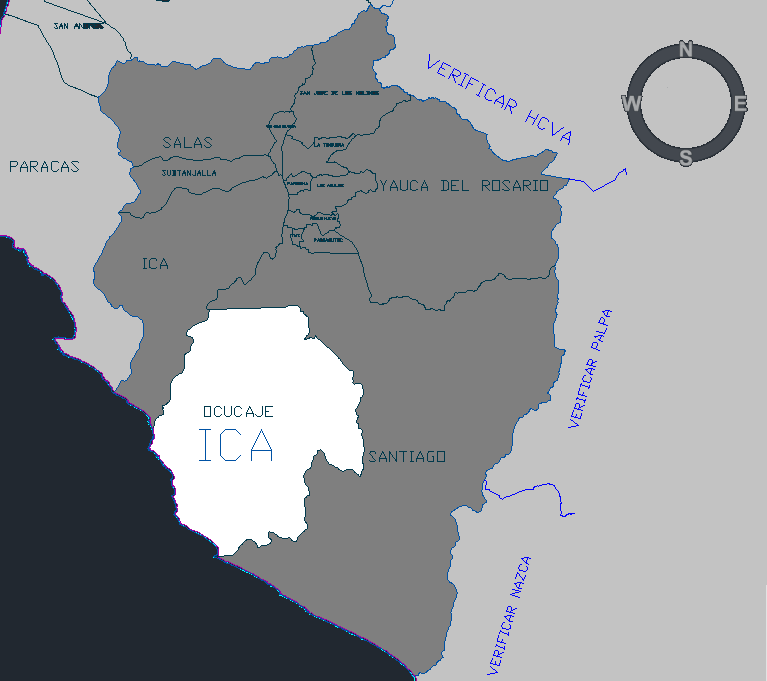
Ocucaje district within Ica province of Ica Region, Peru

== Climate ==
Climate data for Ocucaje, elevation 311 m (1,020 ft), (1991–2020)
Month	Jan	Feb	Mar	Apr	May	Jun	Jul	Aug	Sep	Oct	Nov	Dec	Year
Mean daily maximum °C (°F)	33.0 (91.4)	33.8 (92.8)	34.0 (93.2)	32.2 (90.0)	29.3 (84.7)	26.1 (79.0)	24.9 (76.8)	26.1 (79.0)	28.2 (82.8)	29.9 (85.8)	30.8 (87.4)	32.1 (89.8)	30.0 (86.1)
Mean daily minimum °C (°F)	16.8 (62.2)	17.6 (63.7)	17.0 (62.6)	14.5 (58.1)	11.0 (51.8)	9.2 (48.6)	9.2 (48.6)	9.4 (48.9)	10.0 (50.0)	11.0 (51.8)	12.2 (54.0)	14.7 (58.5)	12.7 (54.9)
Average precipitation mm (inches)	1.3 (0.05)	0.5 (0.02)	0.5 (0.02)	0.1 (0.00)	0.1 (0.00)	0.1 (0.00)	0.2 (0.01)	0.1 (0.00)	0.1 (0.00)	0.0 (0.0)	0.0 (0.0)	0.1 (0.00)	3.1 (0.1)
Source: National Meteorology and Hydrology Service of Peru
