= Tecaxic-Calixtlahuaca head =

Terracotta head found in 1933 in Mexico

Coordinates: 19°20′N 99°41′W

The Tecaxic-Calixtlahuaca head is a terracotta head, probably originally part of a larger figurine, discovered in 1933 among pre-Columbian or just post-Columbian grave goods in the Tecaxic-Calixtlahuaca zone in the Toluca Valley, approximately 65 kilometers northwest of Mexico City.

Because the head appears to be similar in style to artifacts of Roman origin, some believe that it is evidence of pre-Columbian trans-oceanic contact between Rome and the Americas, a view strongly promoted by archaeologist Romeo H. Hristov. However, several other explanations for its presence have also been put forward.

== Find ==
The object was discovered by archaeologist José García Payón during an excavation in 1933. It was a grave offering, found under three intact floors of a pyramidal structure. Along with the head were found a number of objects made of gold, copper, turquoise, rock crystal, jet, bone, shell and pottery. The burial was dated to between 1476 and 1510 AD. Payón did not publish information about the head itself until 1960.

== Evidence for Roman manufacture ==
An assessment of the case was made in 2001 by Romeo H. Hristov of the University of New Mexico and Santiago Genovés T. of the National Autonomous University of Mexico.

This result clears up the doubts of Colonial manufacture of the artifact, and makes the hypothesis of Roman origin – among other possibilities – applicable. The identification of the head as Roman work from the II–III century A.D. has been further confirmed by Bernard Andreae, a director emeritus of the German Institute of Archaeology in Rome, Italy. According to Andreae "[the head] is without any doubt Roman, and the lab analysis has confirmed that it is ancient. The stylistic examination tells us more precisely that it is a Roman work from around the II century A.D., and the hairstyle and the shape of the beard present the typical traits of the Severian emperors period [193–235 A.D.], exactly in the 'fashion' of the epoch." (Andreae cited in Domenici 2000: 29). On the other hand, an examination of the field notes of the archaeologist in charge of the excavation as well as the site itself have not revealed, in either case, signs of possible disturbances of the context (Hristov and Genovés 1999).

A thermoluminescence test performed in 1995 by P. Schaaf and G. A. Wagner in the FS Archäometrie unit in Heidelberg, Germany established its age range to somewhere between the 9th century BCE and the middle of the 13th century CE, confirming its pre-colonial provenance. However, Schaaf and Wagner have objected to the way the dates were described by Hristov and Genoves.

== Hypotheses ==
Researchers who have analyzed the artifact have come up with several possible explanations for the object's presence at the site:

- A hoax: according to an informal declaration by Paul Schmidt, an archaeologist at UNAM, the head was planted in the site by a participating archaeologist, Hugo Moedano, in an attempt to play a practical joke on José García Payón, supervisor of the dig. Schmidt stated earlier that García Payón was not present during the entirety of the excavation. García Payón's son insists that his father stated that he was on the site at the time of discovery. According to Hristov, these allegations are hearsay, and because the individuals directly involved have since died, a confirmation or refutation of the allegations has become impossible.
- An import from an early European visitor who came to Central Mexico. The date range for the burial includes the early period of European exploration of the Americas, though it predates the first sustained contact with Mexico under Hernán Cortés. According to Hristov, it is possible but highly unlikely that the head was introduced during the Medieval or early Colonial period. Hristov notes that other historians have considered the possibility of a Norse visit to the region and that the figure's unusual head-dress bears a possible resemblance to Norse or Viking headgear.
- Hristov argues that a Roman, Phoenician, or Berber ship, or the drifting of such a shipwreck to the Mesoamerican shores is the best explanation. Hristov claims that the possibility of such an event has been made more likely by the discovery of evidence of travels from Romans, Phoenicians and Berbers in the 6th or 5th century BC to Tenerife and Lanzarote in the Canaries, and of a Roman settlement (from the 1st century BC to the 4th century AD) on Lanzarote. David Grove, an archaeologist at the University of Illinois, pointed out that being washed ashore from a Roman shipwreck does not imply any contact, let alone Roman discovery of the New World.

== See also ==
- Out-of-place artifact

== Bibliography ==
- Hristov, Romeo H.; Genovés T., Santiago (1999), "Mesoamerica evidence of pre-Columbian transoceanic contacts", Ancient Mesoamerica, 10 (2): 207–213, doi:10.1017/S0956536199102013, S2CID 163071420
- Hristov, Romeo H.; Genovés T., Santiago (2001), "Reply to Peter Schaaf and Günter A. Wagner's "Comments on 'Mesoamerican evidence of pre-Columbian transoceanic contacts'"", Ancient Mesoamerica, 12: 83–86, doi:10.1017/S0956536101121012, S2CID 162717238
- Smith, Michael E. "The 'Roman Figurine' Supposedly Excavated at Calixtlahuaca", Accessed: 2012-02-13. (Archived by WebCite® at
