= Calixtlahuaca =

Archaeological site in Mexico

Coordinates: 19°20′N 99°41′W

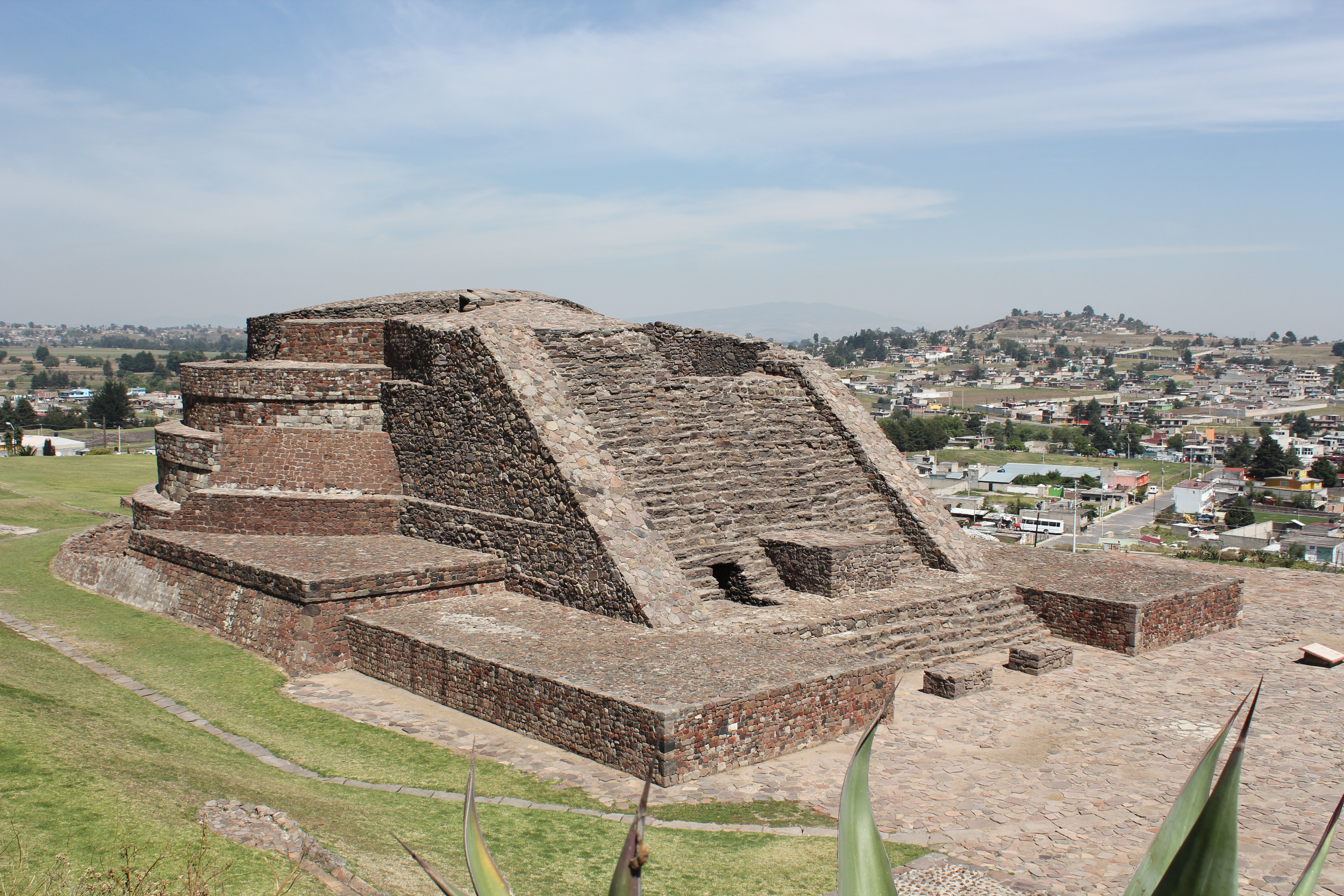
Monument 3, Temple of Ehecatl at Calixtlahuaca

Calixtlahuaca (from the Nahuatl, where calli means "building", and ixtlahuatl means "prairie" or "plains", hence the translation would be "buildings on the plains"; Otomi: Ndähni, windy town, original Matlatzinca name: Pintanbati) is a Postclassic period Mesoamerican archaeological site, located near the present-day city of Toluca in the State of Mexico. Known originally as Pintanbati and later "Matlatzinco", this urban settlement was a powerful capital whose kings controlled a large territory in the Toluca Valley.

== Background ==
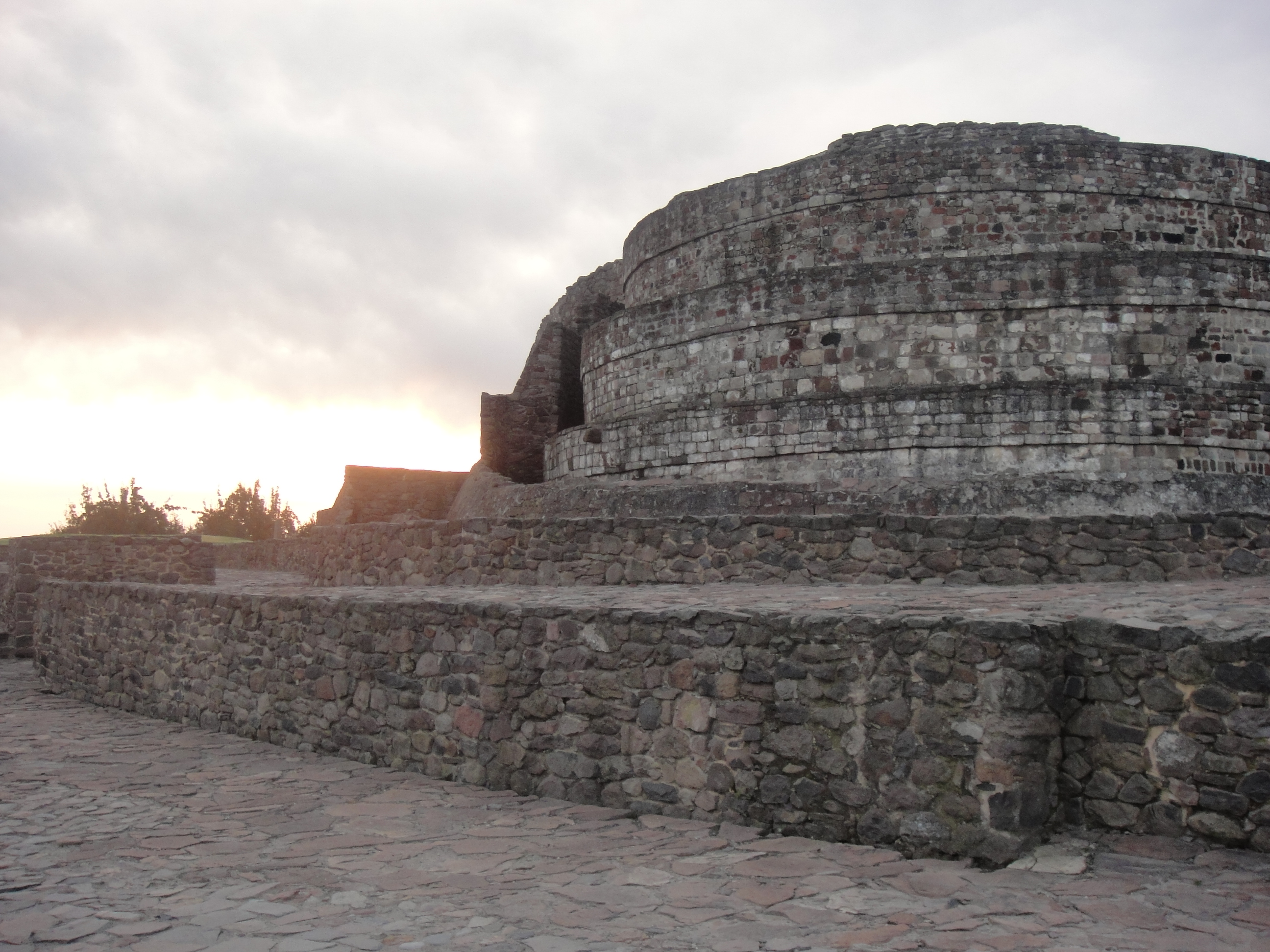
Dawn at Calixtlahuaca

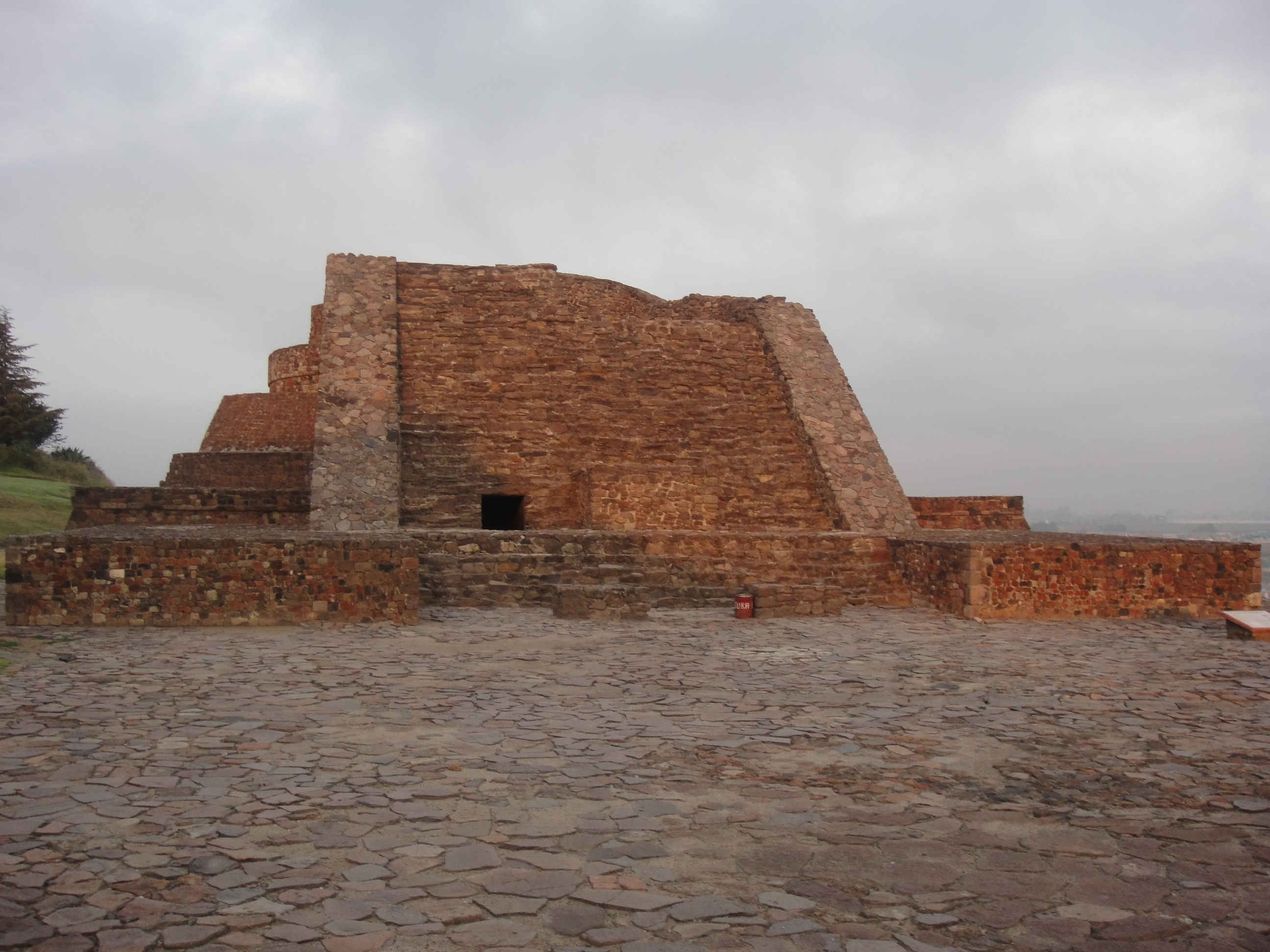
Ehécatl Temple, east stairway, first sun rays

Archaeologist José García Payón excavated the monumental architecture at Calixtlahuaca in the 1930s and restored a number of temples and other buildings. Most notable are Structure 3, a circular temple dedicated to the Aztec wind god Ehecatl, and Structure 17, a large royal “palace”. The architecture and stone sculpture at the site is similar to that of other Middle to Late Postclassic period (AD 1100–1520) Aztec sites in central Mexico.

In 1930, the preserved area of site had an extension of 144 hectares, today it only has 116.

Between 1988 and 1998, some projects have been implemented to preserve and protect the site contents. These projects included drainage requirements, leveling of some areas, signaling, site regulations, and protection against urban growth.

In 1998, archeologist Jorge Villanueva Villalpando restored the south wall of the eastern facade of Building III, which was damaged by constant and strong storms.

In 2002 Dr. Michael E. Smith initiated a new research project at Calixtlahuaca. This project was sponsored by Arizona State University and the National Science Foundation, and fieldwork began in 2006 with a full-coverage intensive survey of the site. In 2007 a series of houses and terraces were excavated, revealing the form of life of the inhabitants of Calixtlahuaca for the first time.

== Inhabitants ==
It is believed that the initial settlers of this region were nomadic natives who used to visit seasonally. Lázaro Manuel Muñoz (over 200 years ago), stated that the Matlatzincas, or their nomad ancestors, visited this site at least 640 BCE (a theory appears consistent with Lorenzo Boturini) and that Otomi hunter-gatherer groups were present 3,000 years ago at the now dried up lake, which was fed by melting water from Nevado de Toluca. Subsequently, the Matlatzinca arrived and founded a small settlement which became under eventual Toltec cultural influence. It is also believed that the Matlatzinca ethnic group belonged to the Nahua family that had previously invaded the territory.

The town of Tecaxic was conquered by the Mexicas and became dominated by the Aztecs at about 1476 AD., during the reign of Tlatoani Axayacatl. As the city was destroyed, the Aztecs built a new city that was then called Calixtlahuaca.

In 1510, the Matlatzinca tried to end the Aztec tutelage and Moctezuma II immediately ordered the city destroyed and the inhabitants fled west towards Michoacán. Later, the city was repopulated by various groups, which concentrated on agriculture, farming and animal husbandry. Among the municipalities formed were Tollocan, Tenancingo, Ocuilan, Calimaya and Tepemaxalco, the latter being the most important.

== Invasions ==
The Matlatzinca lands were considered a corn producing region, and this may have been the main reason for the continued invasions from the epiclassical period, first by the Toltecs and subsequently by Chālcah (confederacies) in the 12th century. The region was divided into three Altepetls, two of which were prepared to remain independent and possibly associate with the Purépechas of Michoacán, but a third Altepetl (Tollocan), wanted an association with the Aztecs. This division prompted the Matlatzinca migration to other regions, such as Tiripitío, Andarapeo, Huetamo, Charo and Undameo, among others.

Axayacatl, the Tenochtitlan Huey Tlatoani (1469-1481) fought against Cuextapalin, a Mazatleca general, whose slingshot stuck Axayacatl in the leg (causing a lifetime injury), and tried to take him prisoner unsuccessfully. Later, the Aztecs returned with their Tollocan allies and fought against Matlatzinca in 1474, taking 11,070 prisoners to be sacrificed in Tenochtitlan, thus preventing further uprisings in the region, as well as resettling Nahua families to Calixtlahuaca.

From 1482 to 1484, there was another attempted Matlatzinca rebellion, but Tizoc destroyed the Calixtlahuaca temples, marking his victory on a stone. The last rebellion attempt occurred in 1510, and the Aztec Tlatoani Montezuma II, ordered the destruction of the area, which led to the emigration of its inhabitants to Michoacán.

== Occupation periods ==
As a result of some of the investigations performed, the following occupation periods have been interpreted and established:

- Preclassical Period (1500 – 200 BC) Small clay heads type A, B, C, D & F, as well as vertical walls tied with mud as part of the constructive system of terraces in the middle of the Tenismo hill, where some housing units were located. (Probably Otomi groups.)
- Classical Period (300 – 600 AD) Ceramic belonging to the Teotihuacán third classic period, and first stage of building III, which was damaged during the 1475 earthquake. (Teotihuacan Groups.)
- Epiclassical period (900 – 1200 AD) Toltec influence with the increased construction of terraces on slopes and some buildings. (Toltec Groups.)
- Postclassical Period (1200 – 1510 AD) Distinguished by a Matlatzinca near hegemony that is limited by the Aztec influence. (Matlatzincas Groups and eventually Mexicas.)

== Site ==
The Postclassic site extended approximately 264 hectares, covering portions of the valley floor, the majority of the Cerro Tenismo hill, and portions of a smaller hill to the east. All of the major monumental architecture at the site was built during this period. Unlike many Postclassic Mesoamerican cities, which usually have a single central group of monumental architecture, the large structures at Calixtlahuaca are split into multiple smaller architectural groups scattered from the valley floor to the summit of the hill. The areas between the monumental groups were filled in with a mixture of commoner houses and agricultural terraces.

This archaeological site is located at about 2,500 meters, the Cerro Tenismo summit is at 2,975 meter above sea level.

At top of the cerro is a “Stone” water spring, called Pinalinchini.

Main Structures:

=== Monument 1 ===
Located within the urban zone of the town Calixtlahuaca.

=== Monument 2 ===
Yet to be explored by INAH.

=== Monument 3 ===
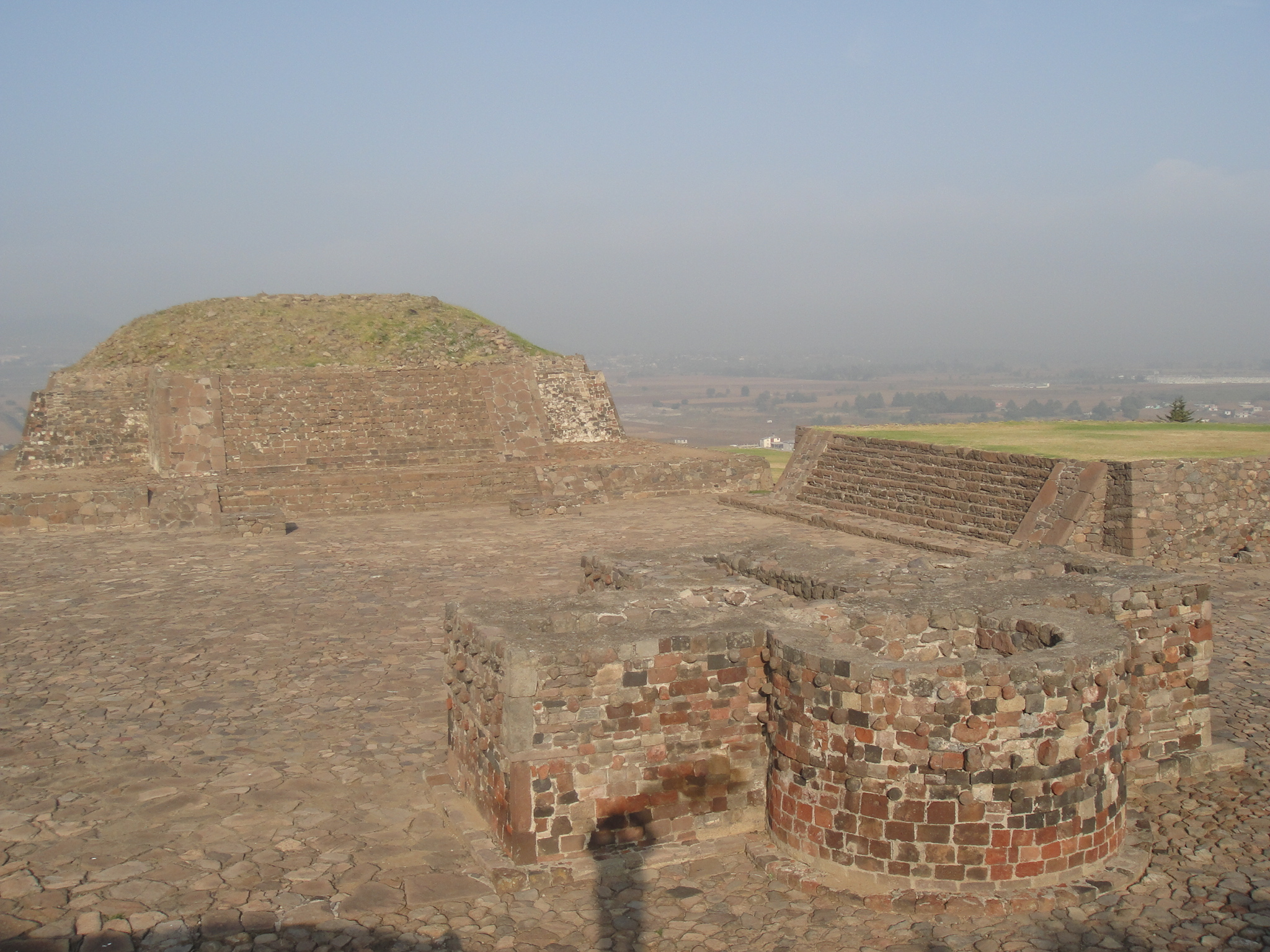
Monument 4, Cross Altar or Tzompantli

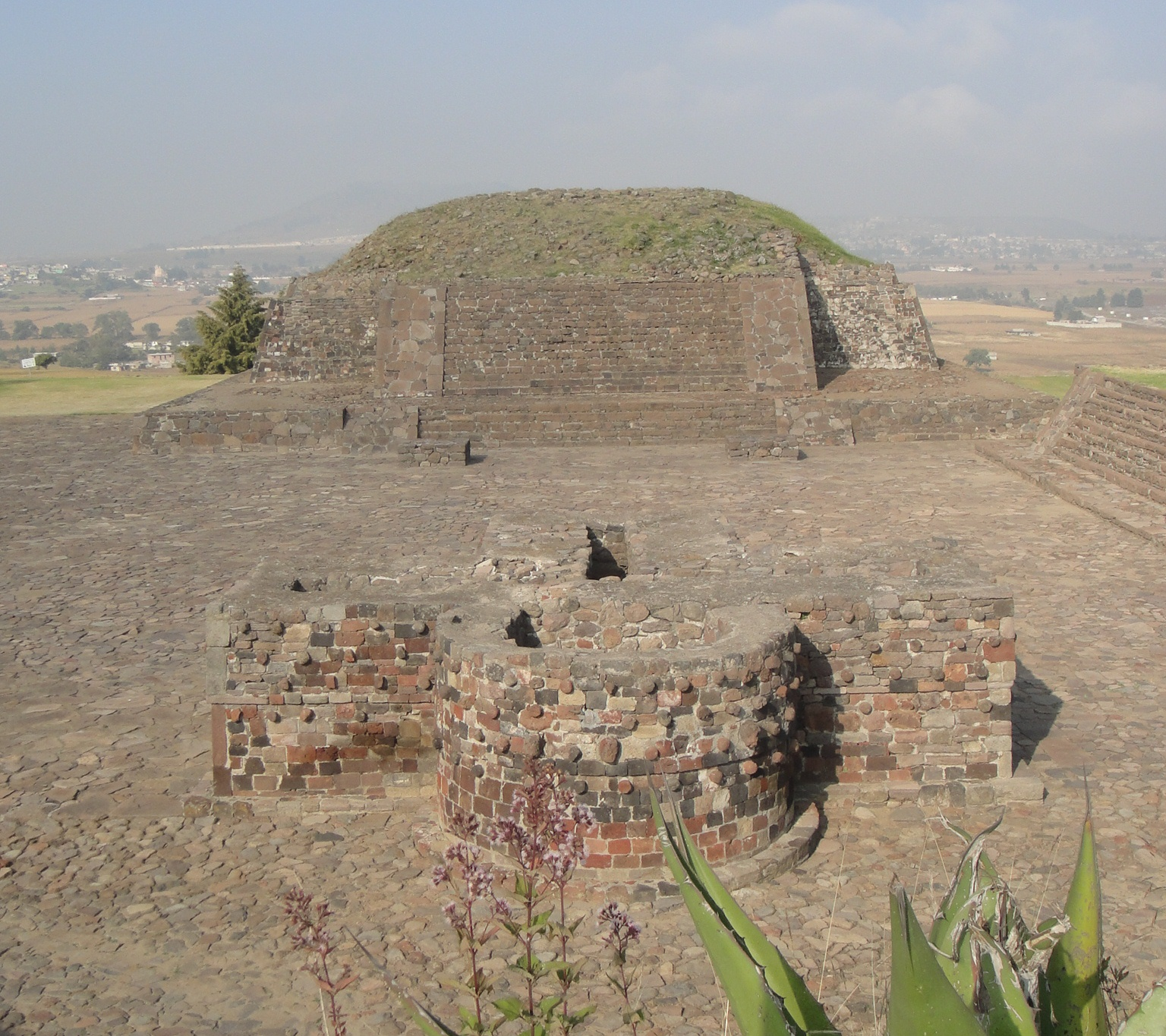
East-West Orientation between the Tzompantli and Monument 4

Quetzalcoatl Temple probably dedicated to Ehécatl. Mesoamerican round buildings, are generally related Ehécatl. The circle is a perfect geometric figure, has no beginning or end, therefore infinite, as the gods.

It is a circular building; Probably the most important building in the site, which was apparently dedicated to the cult of Quetzalcoatl, represented as a male individual wearing sandals and mouth mask resembling a bird beak. It is a large circular temple with four construction stages. García Payon excavated the sculpture of a priest with a mask of the God Ehecatl. This object is one of the best-known sculptures of the Mexica style (Matos Moctezuma and Solis Olguín 2002).

The statue was discovered by chance, during Payón explorations, in his absence, a group of workers saw two large lizards go into a group of stones, the workers removed the stones, found the statue and removed it, and this got Payón upset. One of the workers (Joaquin Alvarez), took one arm, which he later returned.

=== Monument 4 ===
The temple is located within a large plaza, with a single stairway. It forms part of a group in a plaza, with a cross altar decorated with skulls, or mesoamerican tzompantli.

At the north side of the plaza is another structure.

==== Tzompantli ====
This cross altar, had skulls carved in stone embedded around the structure. Originally had more than ten, today there are only two original and the replica of a third, this structure was explored in 1940 by the Guatemalan Archaeologist Carlos Navarrete.

=== Monument 5 and 7 ===
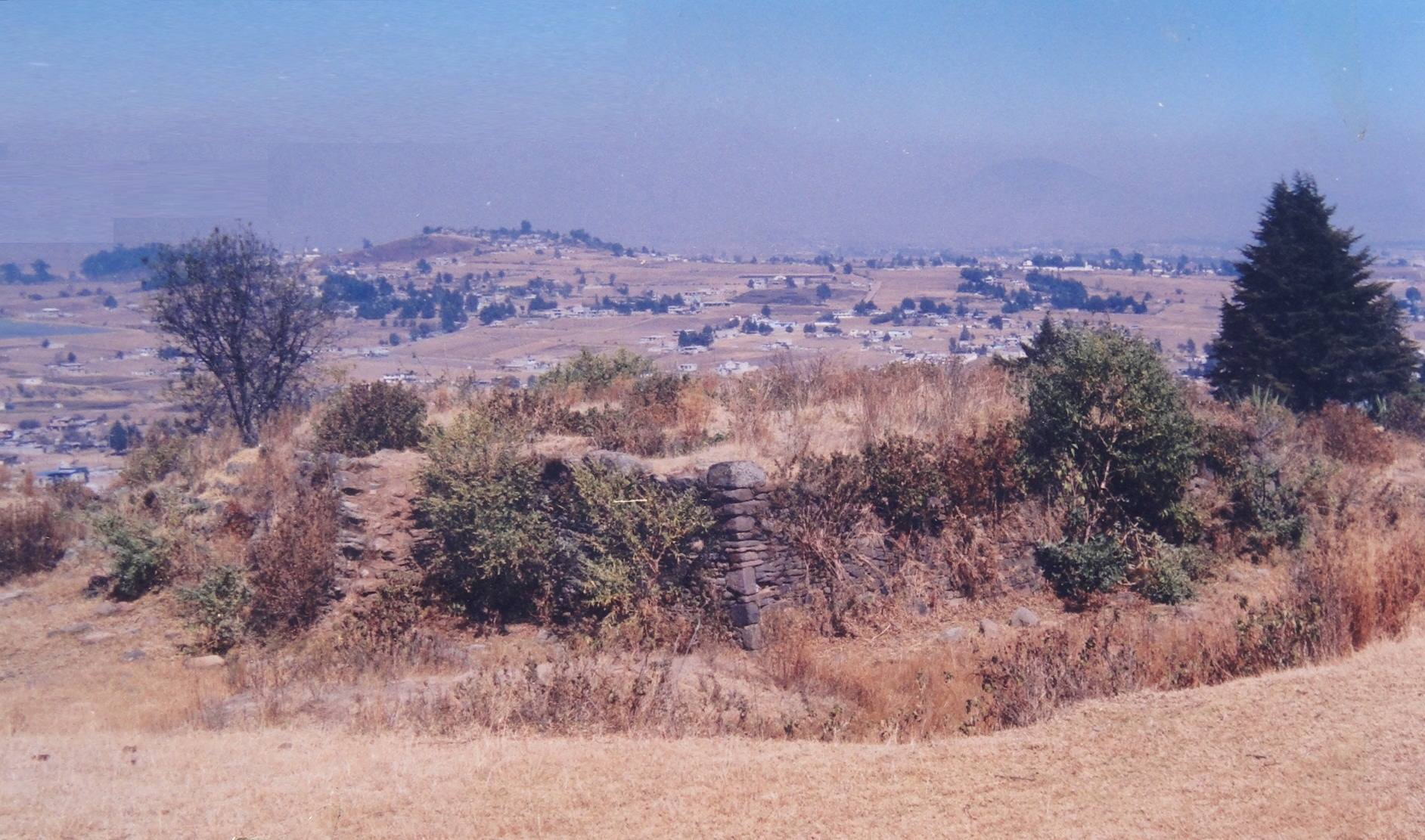
Monuments 5 and 6 before restoration

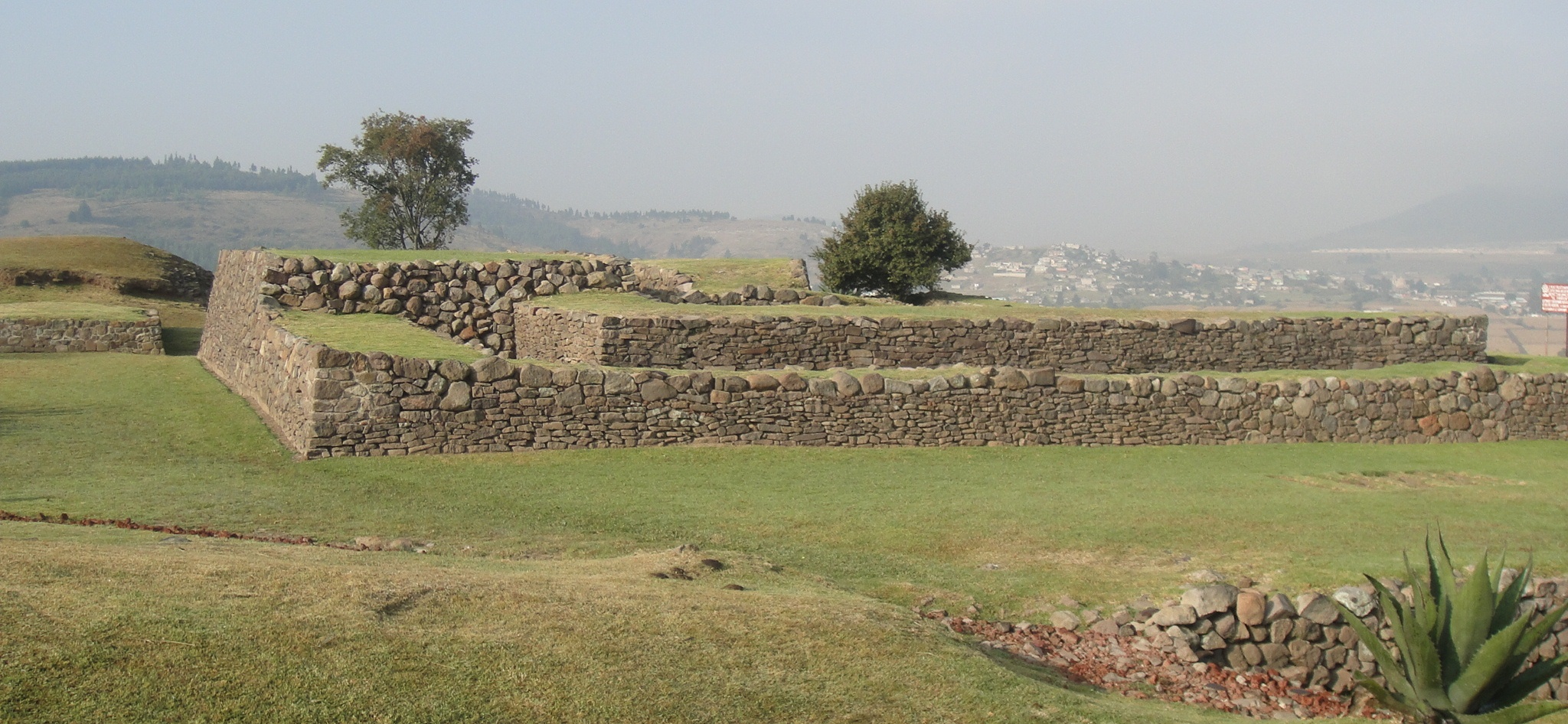
Monuments 5 and 6, restored, as they look today.

Also called the Pantheon, approximately 50 human burials were found here with offerings (gold, ceramic, rocks of obsidian, and arrowheads.) These structures were built on a large terrace and there are remains of seven bases on the West side.

It was restored between 2002 and 2004, personally by Mr. Alejandro Javier Hernandez, approved by INAH technical direction, but without any support or assistance.

East of the main structure, is a hallway (south-north) at the southeast corner, it contains embedded three petroglyphs (see below gallery with composite pictures of petroglyphs).

=== Monument 10 and 11 ===
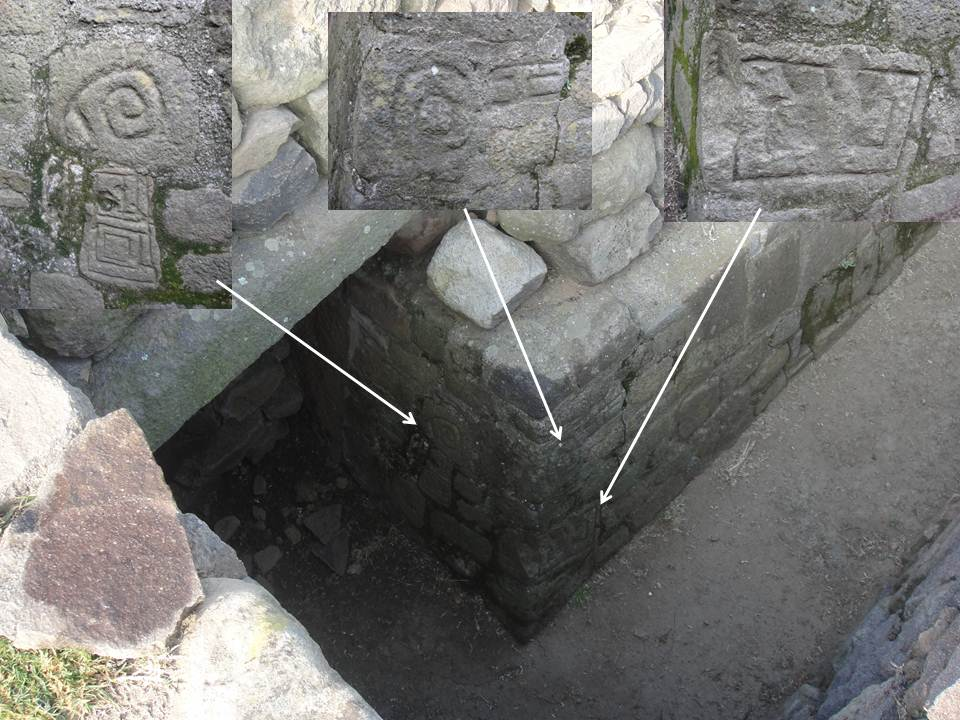
Panteon three Petroglyphs

Not explored, located higher up on the hill side.

=== Monument 13, 14 and 15 ===
Not explored, located higher up on the hill side.

=== Monument 16 ===
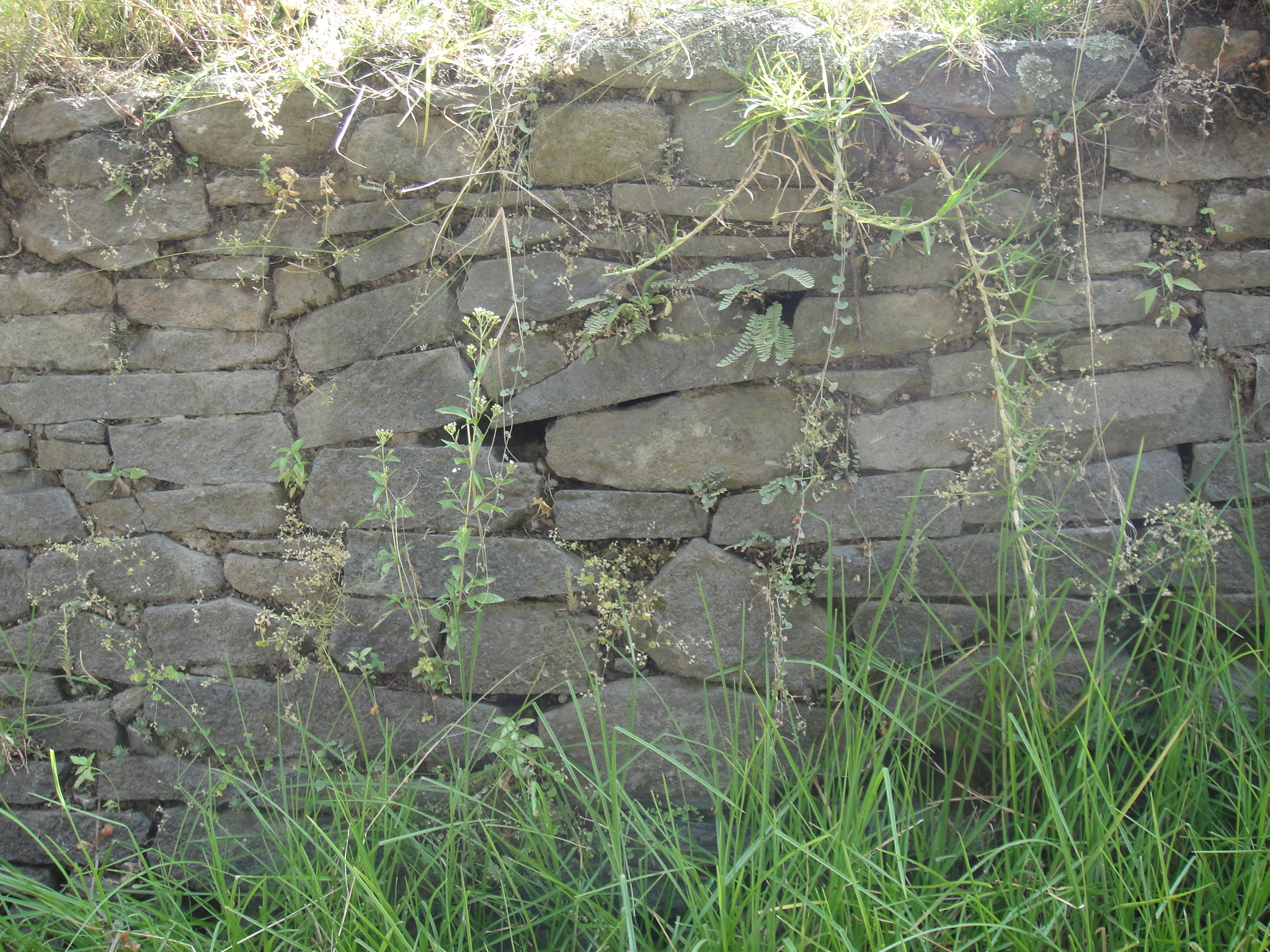
Basement perimeter wall detail

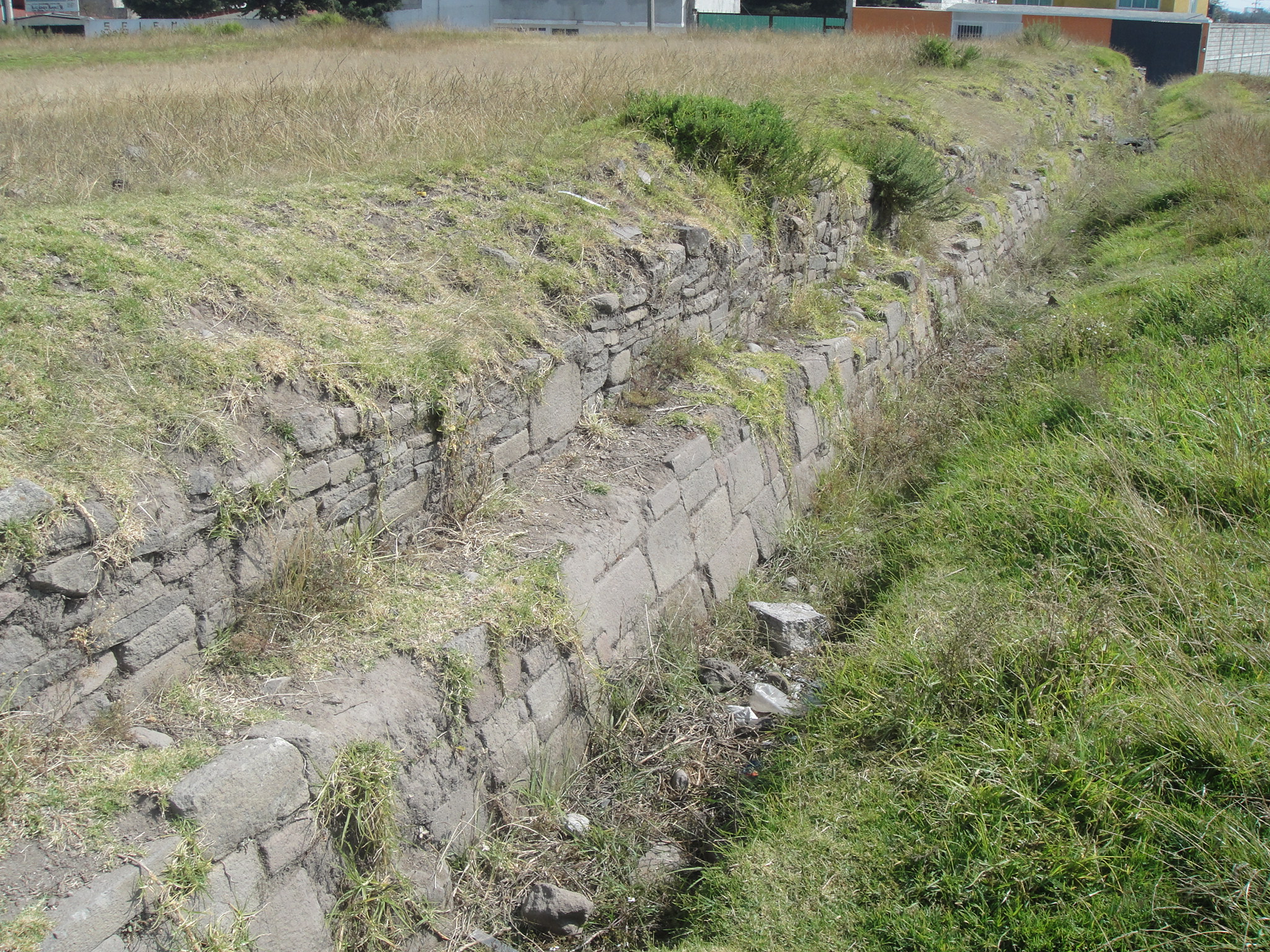
Basement perimeter wall, two constructive stages can be seen

Comprises remains of a large basement, about 85 meters wide by 100 long, García Payon found an engraved round stone with a hole in the center, similar to those embedded at ballgame courts, he assumed it was one, there has not been any further exploration, it is located approximately 500 North of Temple 3, within the urban area.

=== Monument 17 ===
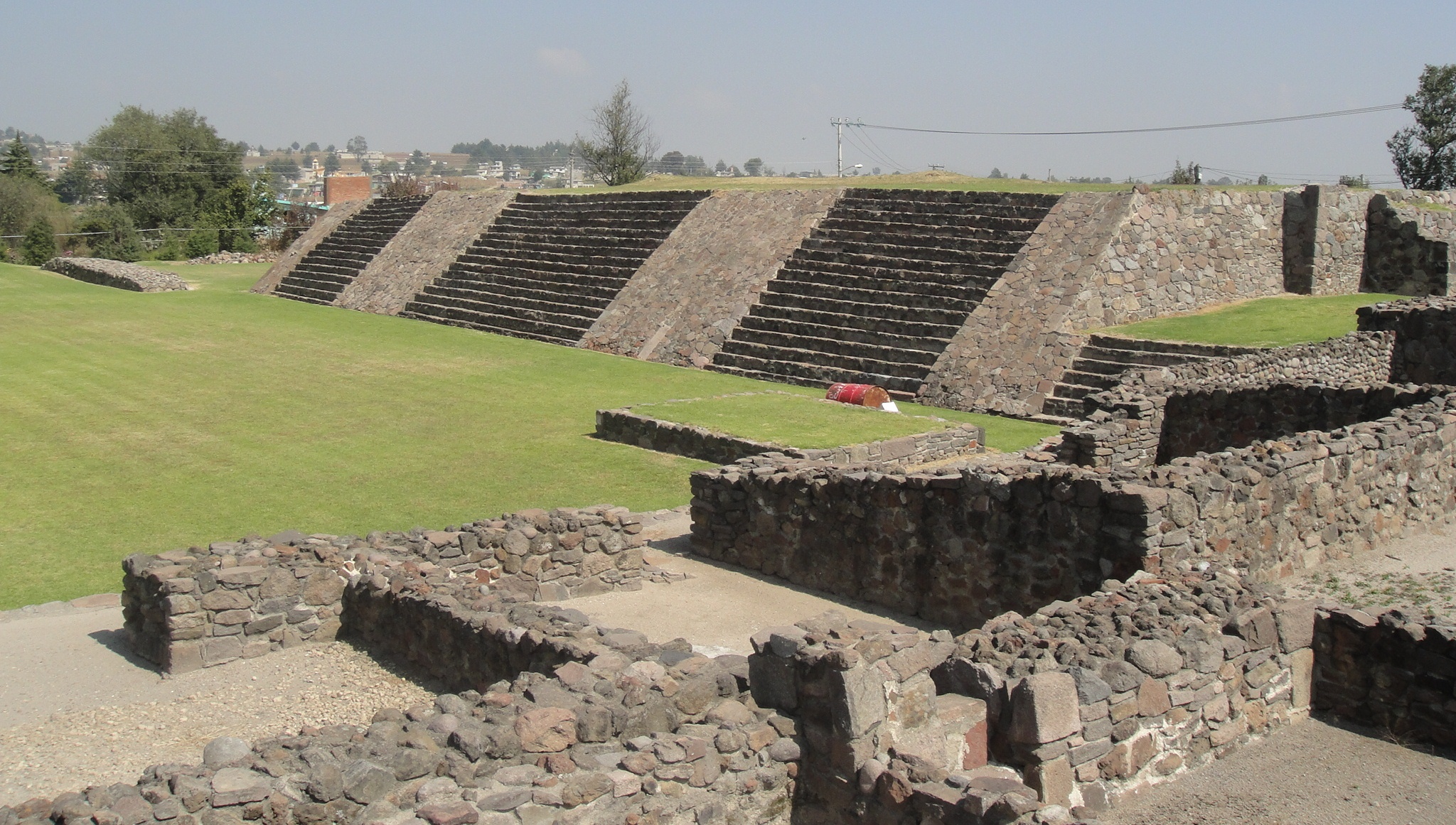
Residential area, Temple and stairways in the background

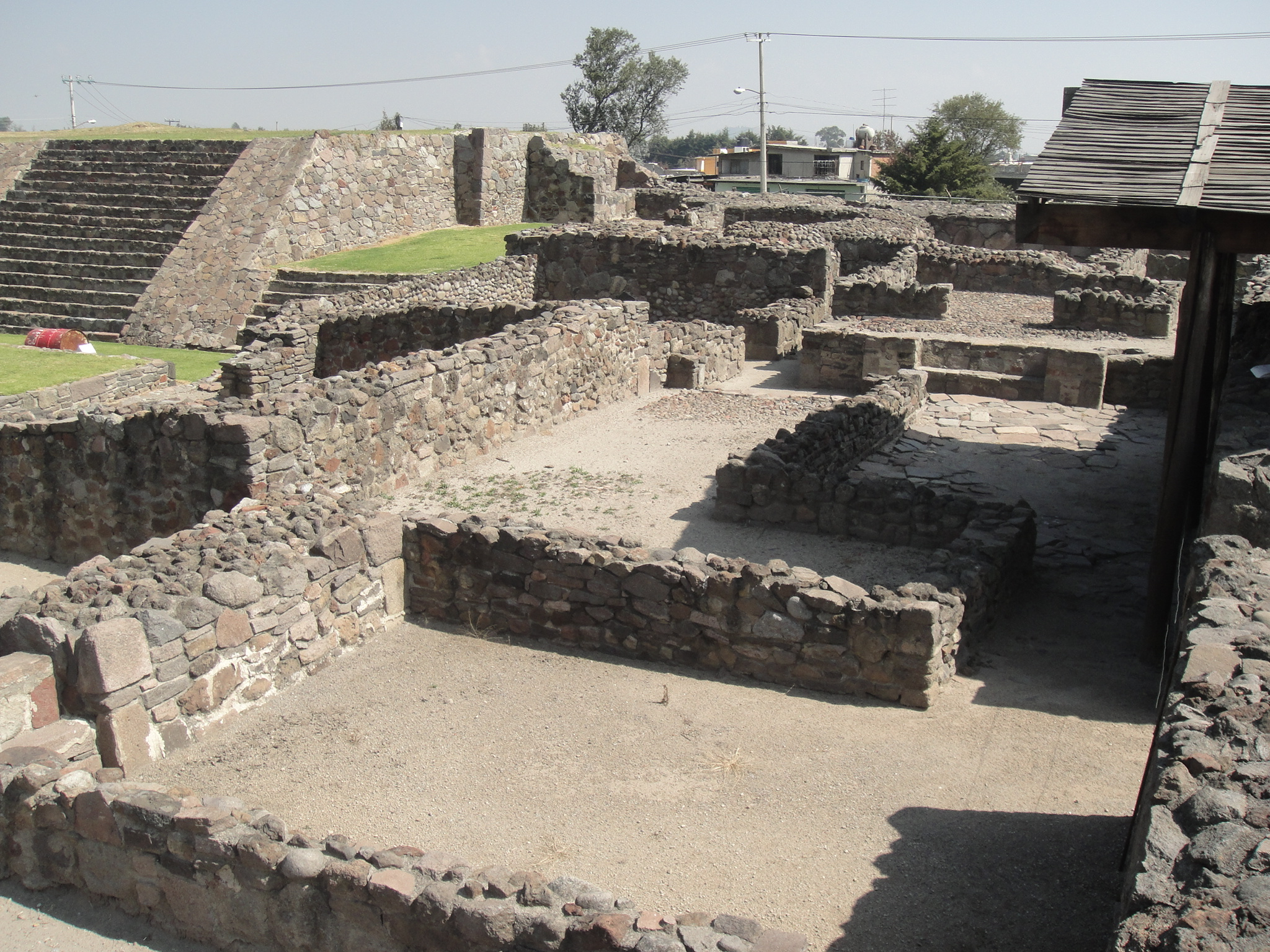
Struct. 17 - Residential Complex

Monumento 17 is in reality a complex. Although García Payón identified it as a "Calmecac" (school and priests residence), is much more likely it actually was the Royal Palace in the city. It has the same type of other Aztec palaces (Evans 2004; Smith 2005a).

Altogether it has 32 rooms, an original adobe wall, and three different stages of construction. It has interior corridors and access stairs to different levels.

To the visitor eyes, the complex can be divided into four main parts, a residential area on the south side of the complex, a ceremonial area with a temple or main basement, a wide plaza in front and bases on the West side area.

==== Residential area ====
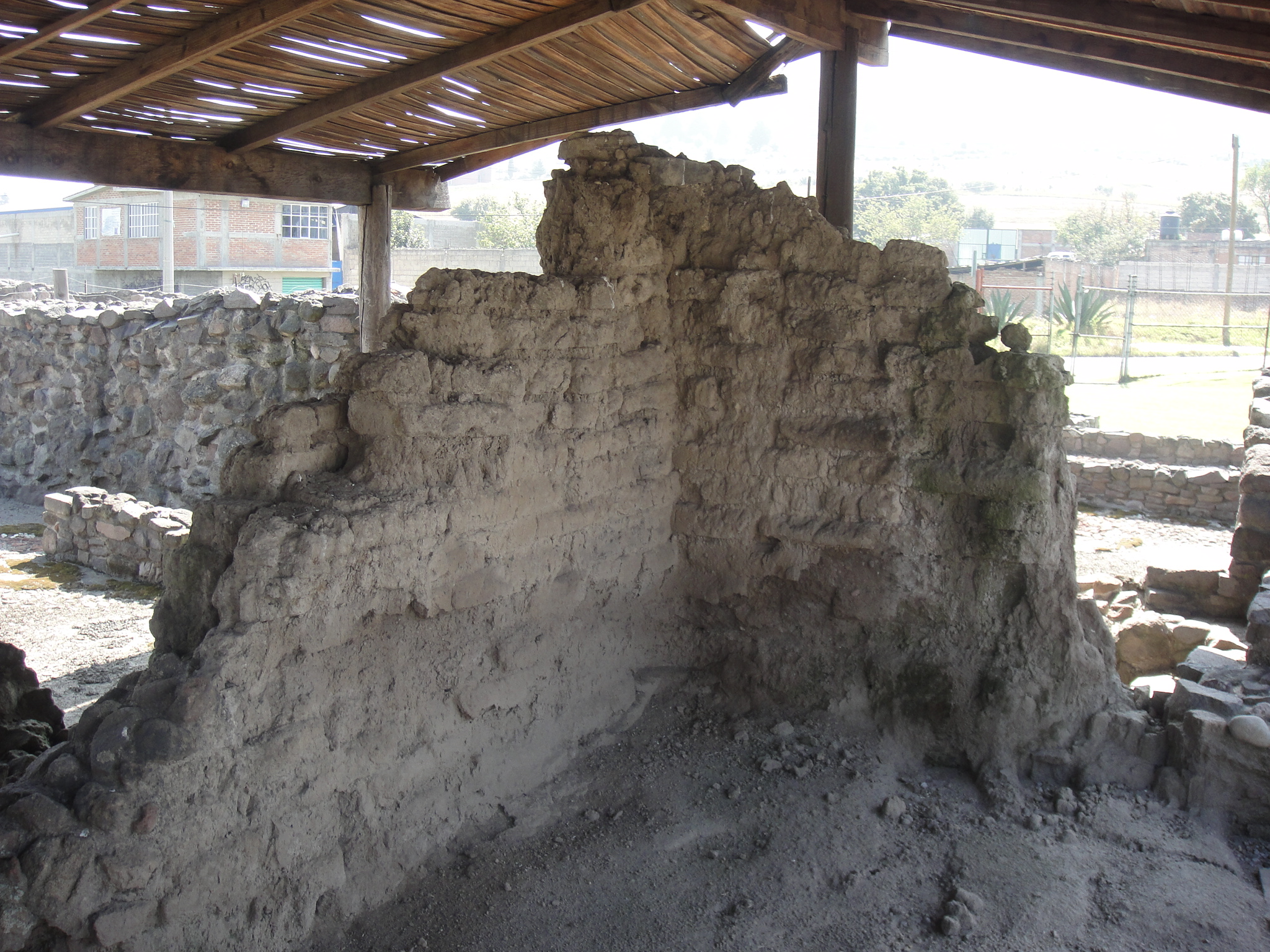
Structure 17, adobe wall

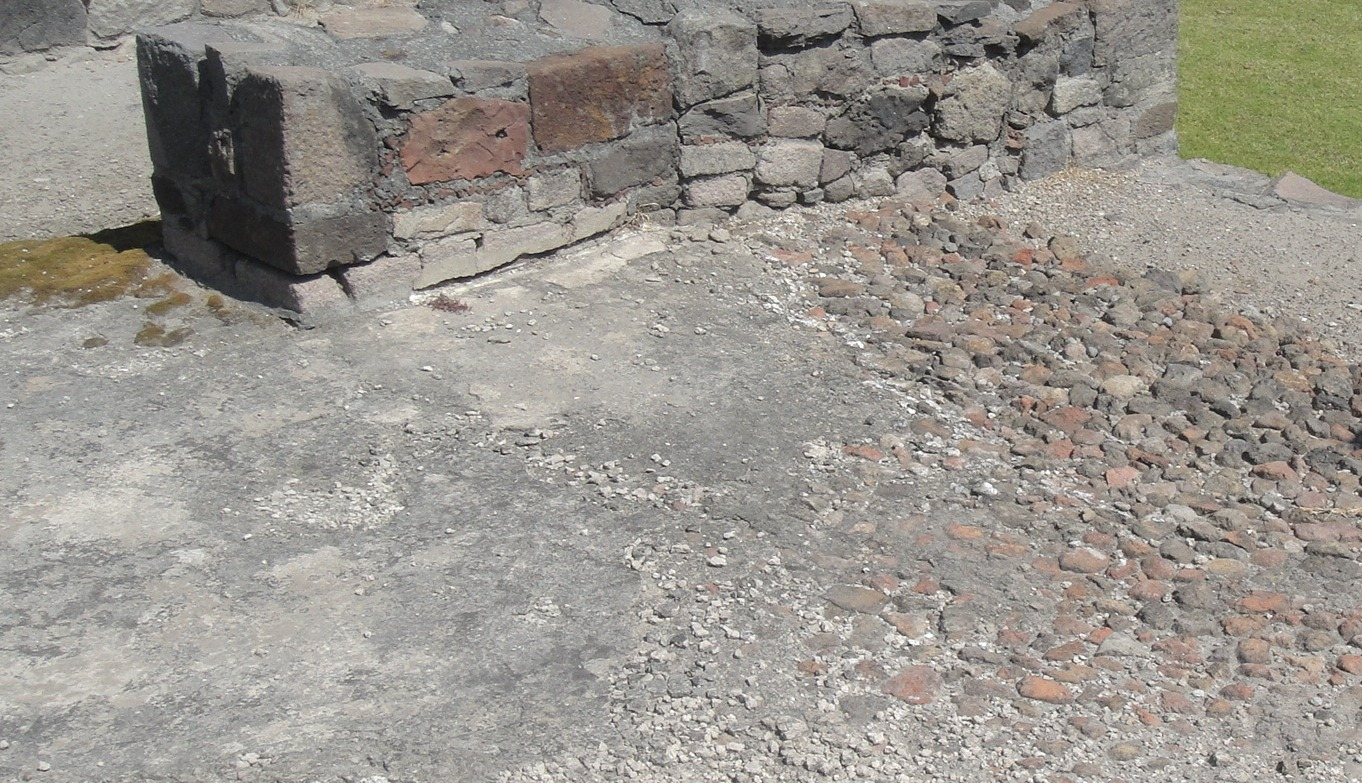
Structure 17 floor detail, stucco over gravel

This area can be subdivided into two sub-areas, divided (east and west) by the adobe wall, it is believed to have been built during the last Mexica occupation, in the late postclassical period.

It has three entrances, one from the West, with communication corridors to the various areas and access to the private housing compound, which has a series of rooms around an internal private patio. This area has another access from the southeast corner of the site. A third entrance provides northern access, to the ceremonial area or the main square.

==== Rooms ====
The main features of all rooms are:

All rooms had stuccoed floors, built over gravel placed on a compacted fill surface, see photographs.

Every room had a square sunken hole, with charcoal remains, that probably were used for heating, cooking or burning ritual Copal.

==== Private quarters ====
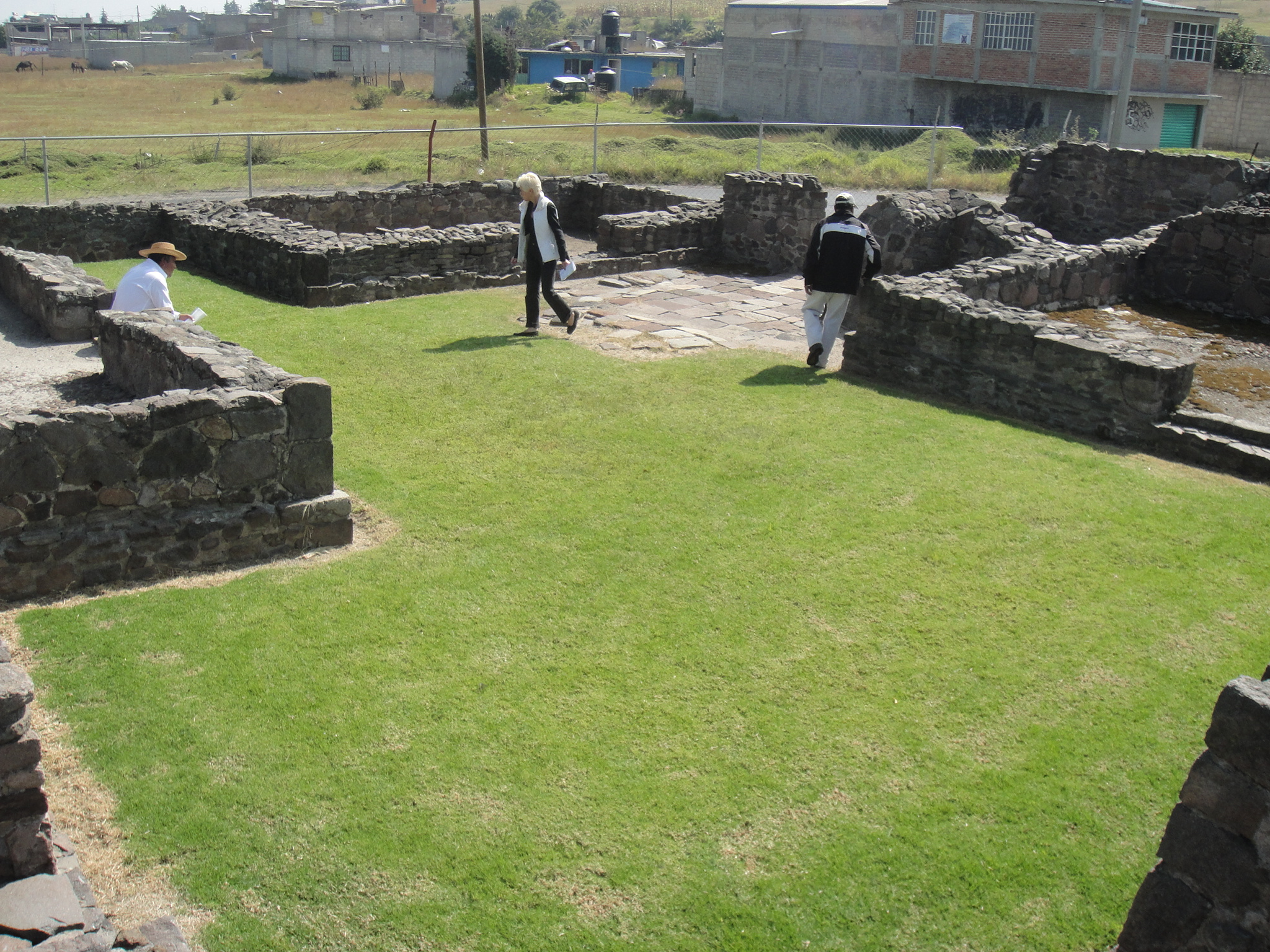
Internal Private Patio

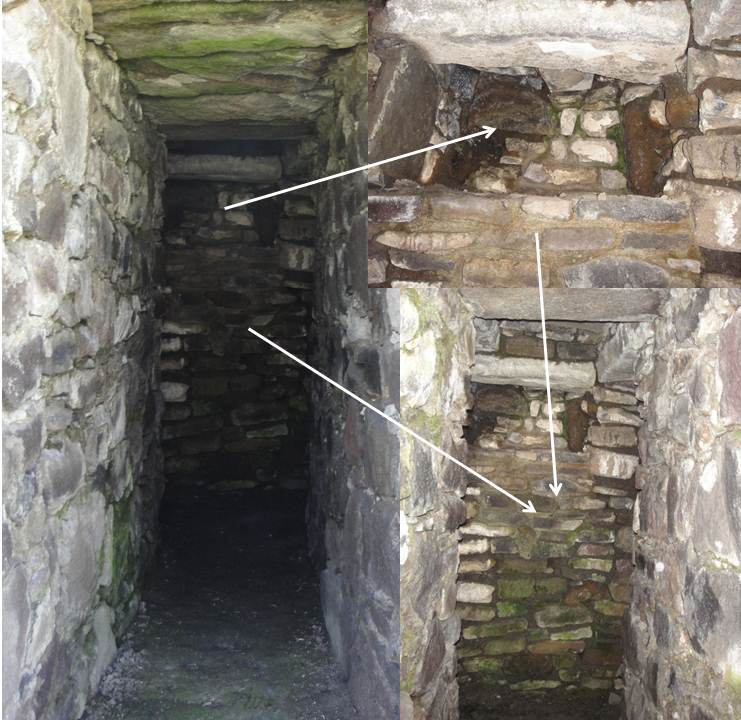
”Probe” the far back on top, first stage, the second below, the third and last in front.

Probably the royal residence of the main city governor, consists of 7 rooms around a private patio and private access, also possibly guards rooms. The rooms are of different sizes and certainly different uses.

==== Main temple ====
This basement has a ceremonial plaza characteristics, has three stairways to access the top, divided by smooth slopped wall sections (alfardas). The center, without a doubt the most important access is approximately 10 meters wide, lateral stairways are 6 meters. It is thought that there were at least three temples at the top. Remains of a stuccoed floor can be seen on top.

This building has a "Probe" or exploration entrance made by archaeologists on the north side, showing three constructive stages. (See Picture)

It has been confirmed in this temple, that there are no secret chambers or tombs, as is normal in similar temples in the Mexico Highlands.

==== Western side structures ====
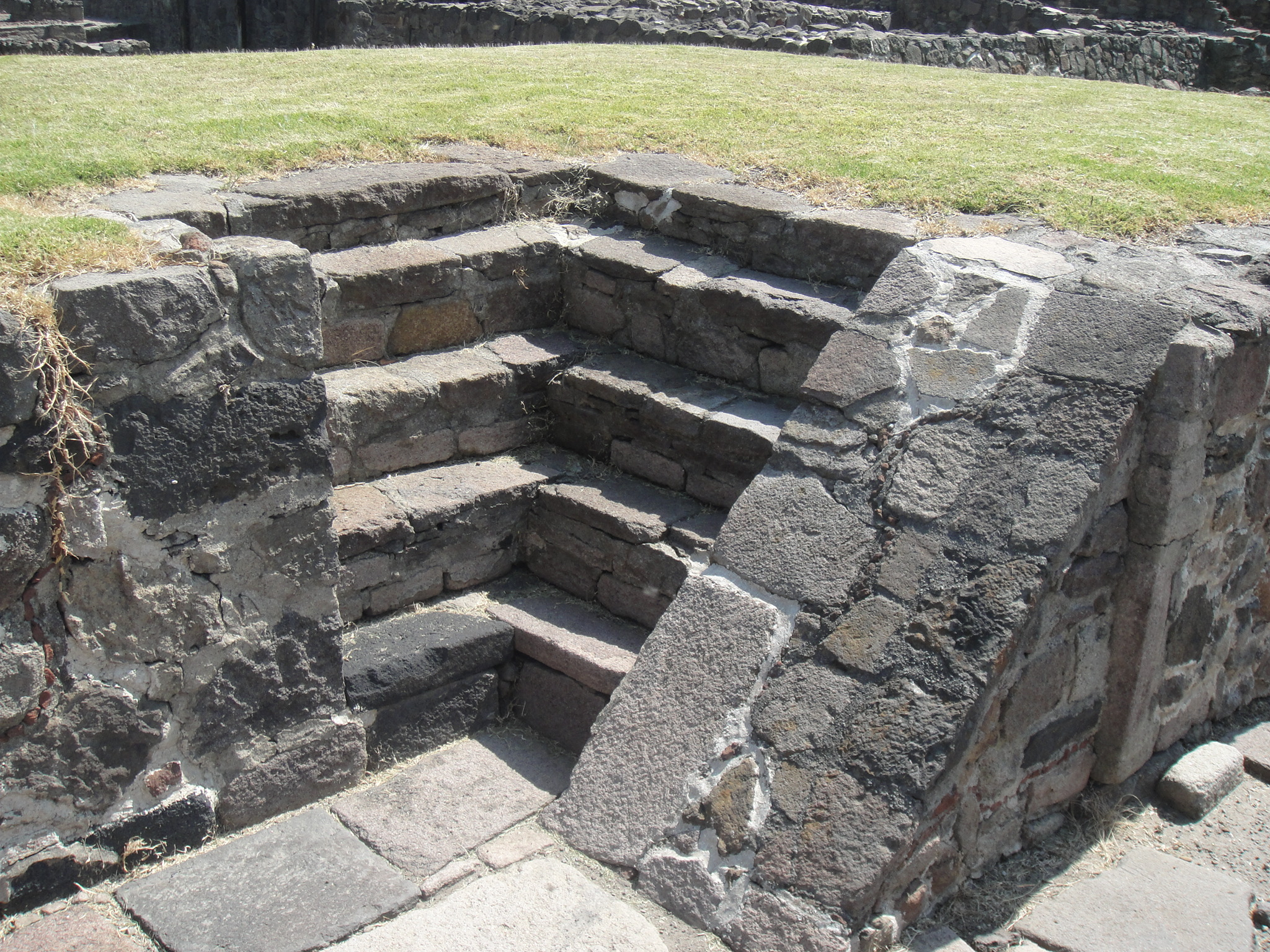
Structure 17, “K” stair

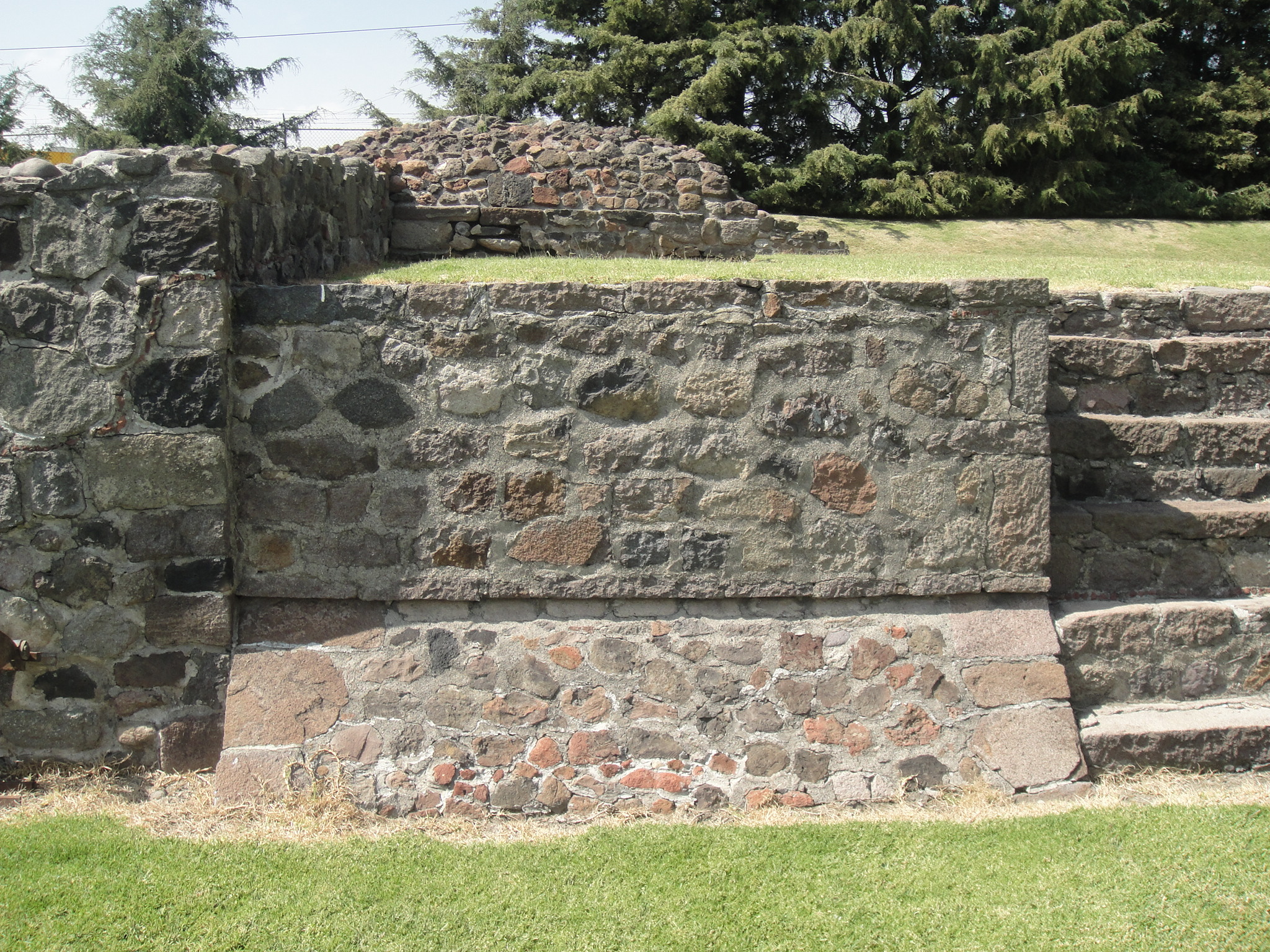
Structure 17, slope-panel

On the west side of the plaza, in front of the main temple, is a series of basements, with remains of constructions, a stair called “K” by García Payón and two beautiful slope-panel constructions, Teotihuacan style.

== Objects found ==
García Payón excavated burials containing ceramic, very similar to vessels from several Teotihuacan stages. Also there is a group of Oaxaca vessels; five shaped as jaguar paw, another with a Zapotec glyph, some are made with the characteristic gray clay of that region, belonging to the Xoo Phase, or Monte Albán IIIb/IV, in the Oaxaca Valley (Caso, et al. 1967; Martínez López, et al. 2000). The presences of these materials confirm the importance of trade practices within these regions, during the Classical and Postclassical periods (Smith y Lind 2005).

=== Ceramic ===
The largest ceramic objects group is “Malacates”, and more than 50% of these are large Malacates, used for spinning maguey fiber.

Among figurines, three groups were identified:

- Objects in the style of the Aztec figurines of Valley Mexico and Morelos (Leonard 1950; Cook Smith 2005b), but with different paste (probably local paste of the Toluca Valley)
- Objects in the style of the figurines Aztecs, with the typical Orange paste used in the Valley of Mexico (imported);
- Figurines resembling Postclassical figures, unclassified, it is assumed to be local styles, yet to be identified. The presence of these three categories is also noted in the Postclassical Yautepec figurines (Smith 2005b).

=== Polished and carved lithic ===
There are 32 maguey de-fibers. Oto-Pame (Folan 1989; Ohi 1975; Parsons y Parsons 1990).

Also there are multiple objects as hands and stone boxes. De-fibers are common in Postclassical period burials in the Toluca Valley (Carbajal Correa and Gonzalez Miranda 2003;) Ohi 1975; Zúñiga Bárcenas 2001).

There are only 20 carved lithic artifacts, made of Flint and Obsidian.

=== Copper/bronze ===
There are 81 copper objects; it is one of the largest Collections outside the territory of the Purépecha Empire. Other Calixtlahuaca copper objects exist in the United States, for example, the American Museum of Natural History in New York City. Most are rattles, and their forms resemble objects cast in bronze at the Postclassical period in the West and the Center of Mexico (Hosler 1994).

=== Beads ===
There are 366 green glass beads in the collection and 23 shells objects with holes.

=== Stone sculptures ===
The Ehécatl sculpture is well known everywhere. Also known is the Chalchiuhtlicue goddess figure, currently exhibited at National Museum of anthropology of Mexico City, I the Aztec room. But a fact not well known is that there is a large collection (275 pieces) of Calixtlahuaca stone sculptures. Many are the Mexica style, and others (including a large group of reliefs) are of a different style, probably a Toluca Valley local style.

=== Sacrificial stone ===
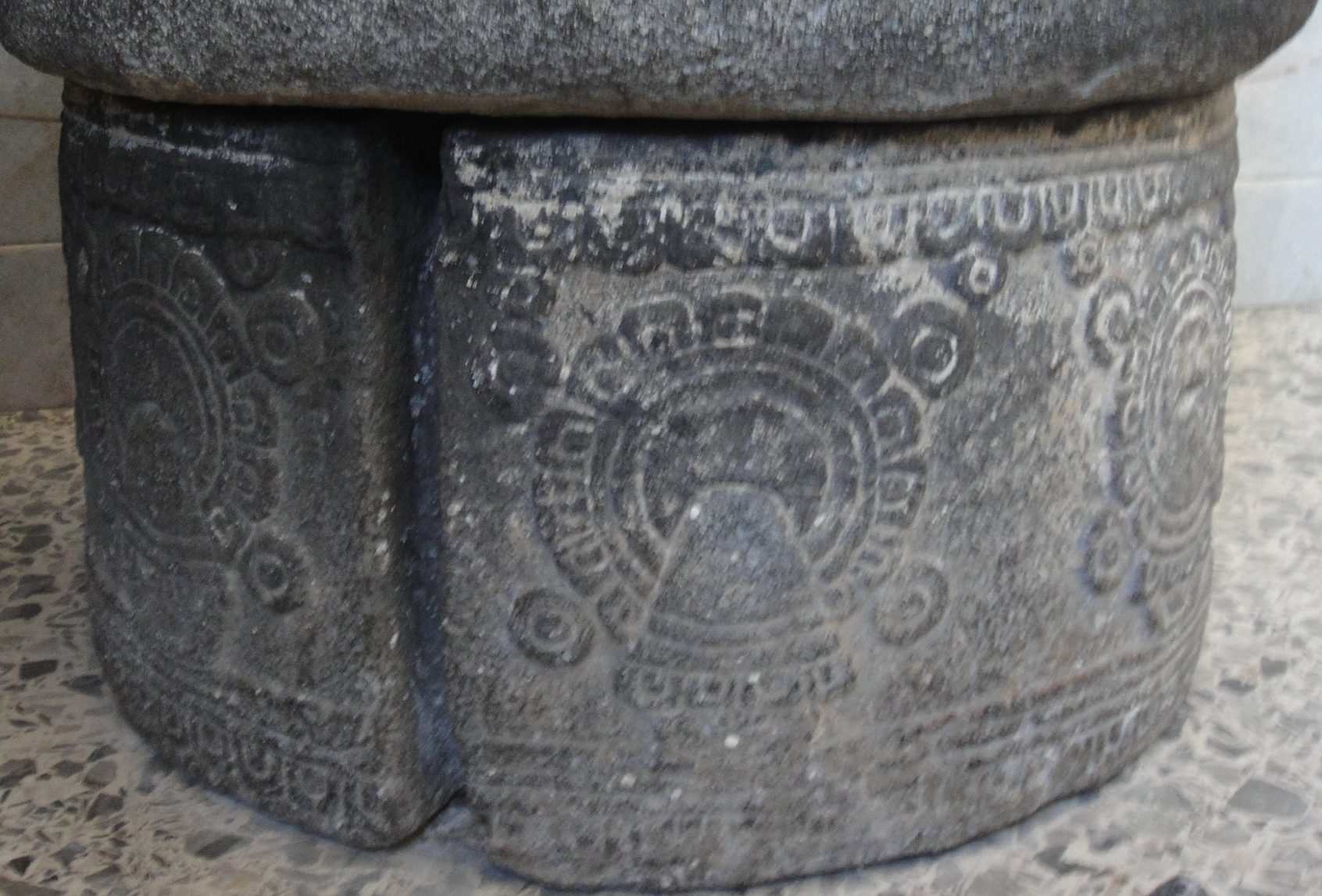
Parrish, Sacrificial Stone

There were two similar stones, one with a concave top, is located in the parish of St. Francis of Assisi in Calixtlahuaca. The other with a flat top is at the Toluca Museum.

=== Petroglyphs ===
For the St. Francis of Assisi parish construction in the town of Calixtlahuaca, undetermined number of stones, from the archaeological site were used, some engraved stones can be seen at the church exterior walls, see the below Gallery.

=== Calixtlahuaca head ===
Calixtlahuaca is also known for the discovery of a ceramic dubbed the "Tecaxic-Calixtlahuaca head" uncovered during García Payón's excavations in 1933. Anthropologist Robert Heine-Geldern identified the head as deriving from the Hellenistic-Roman school of art, and suggested a date of approximately AD 200. Although this artifact has a provenance similar to other items excavated at that time – and radioluminescence testing and stylistic analysis seem to support the antiquity of the artifact – mainstream Mesoamerican scholars remain skeptical.

== Gallery ==
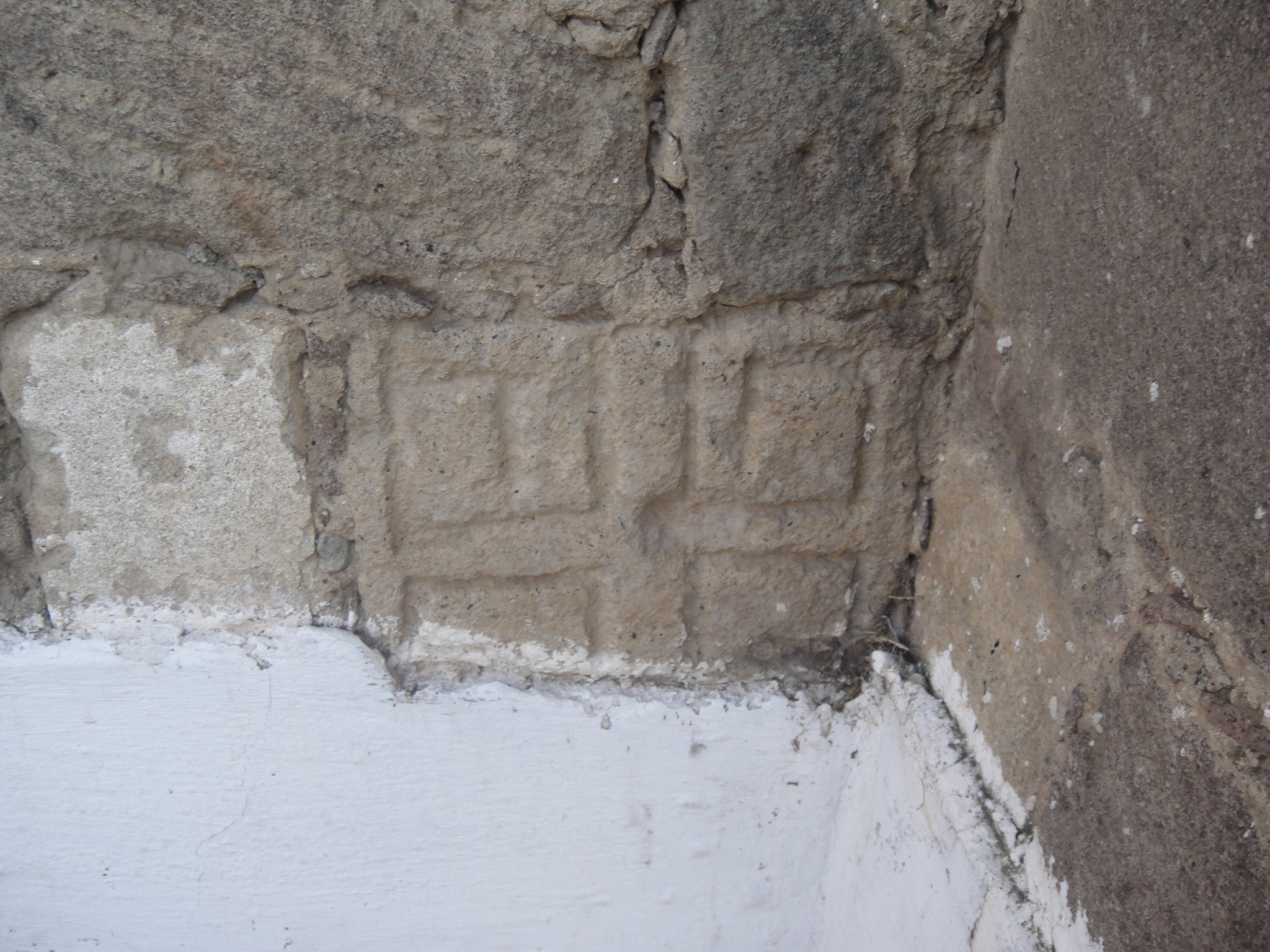

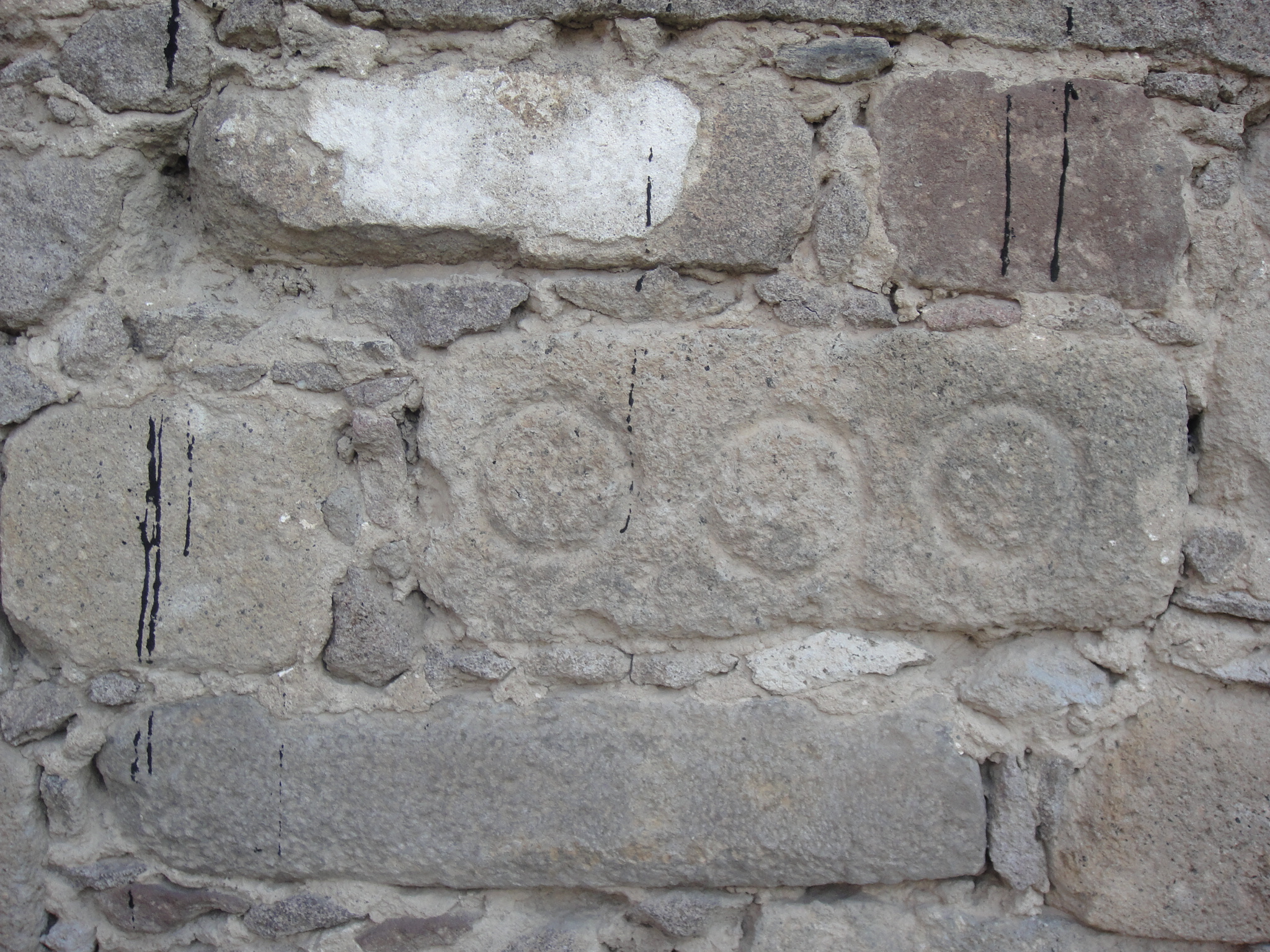

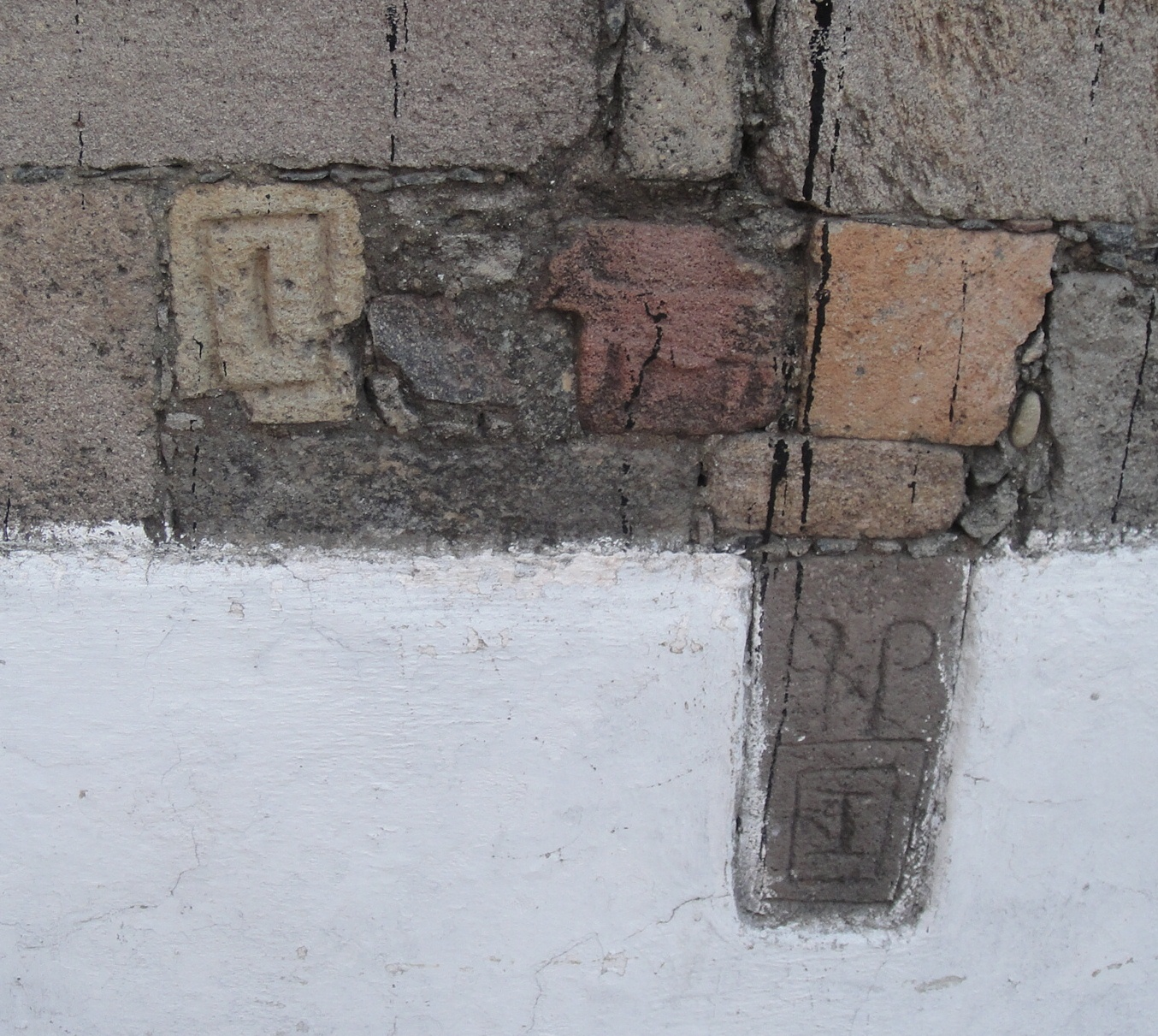

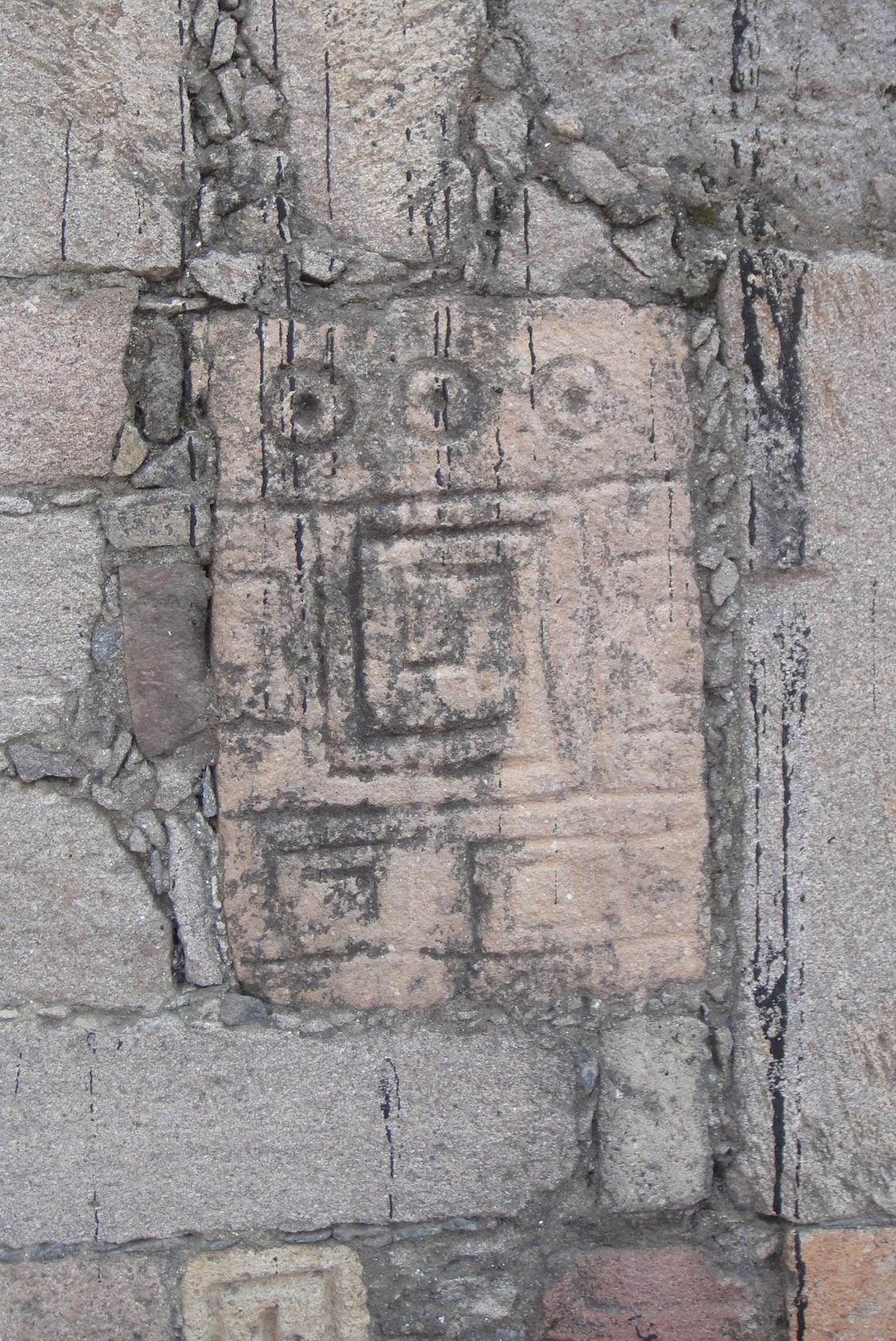

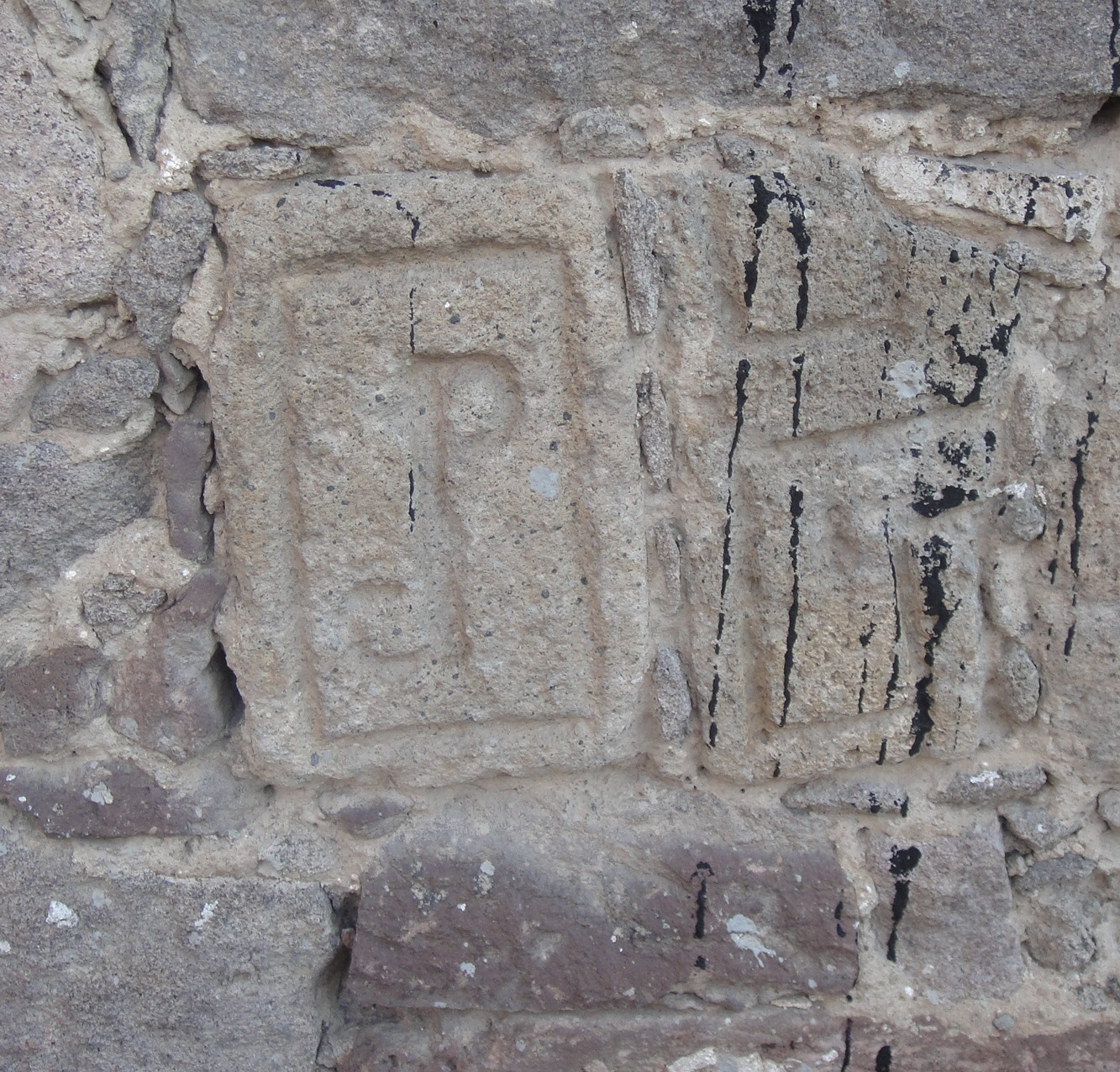

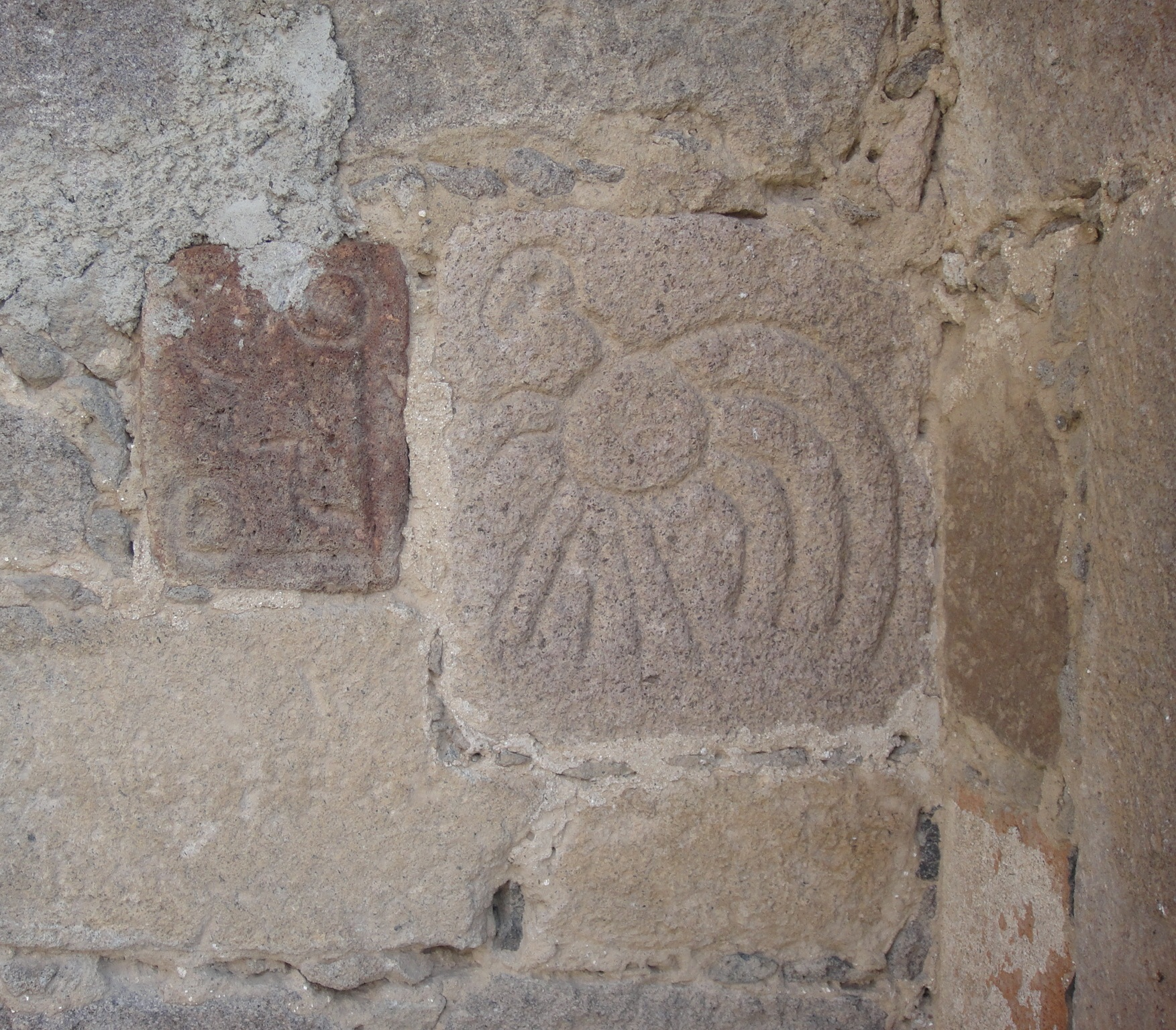

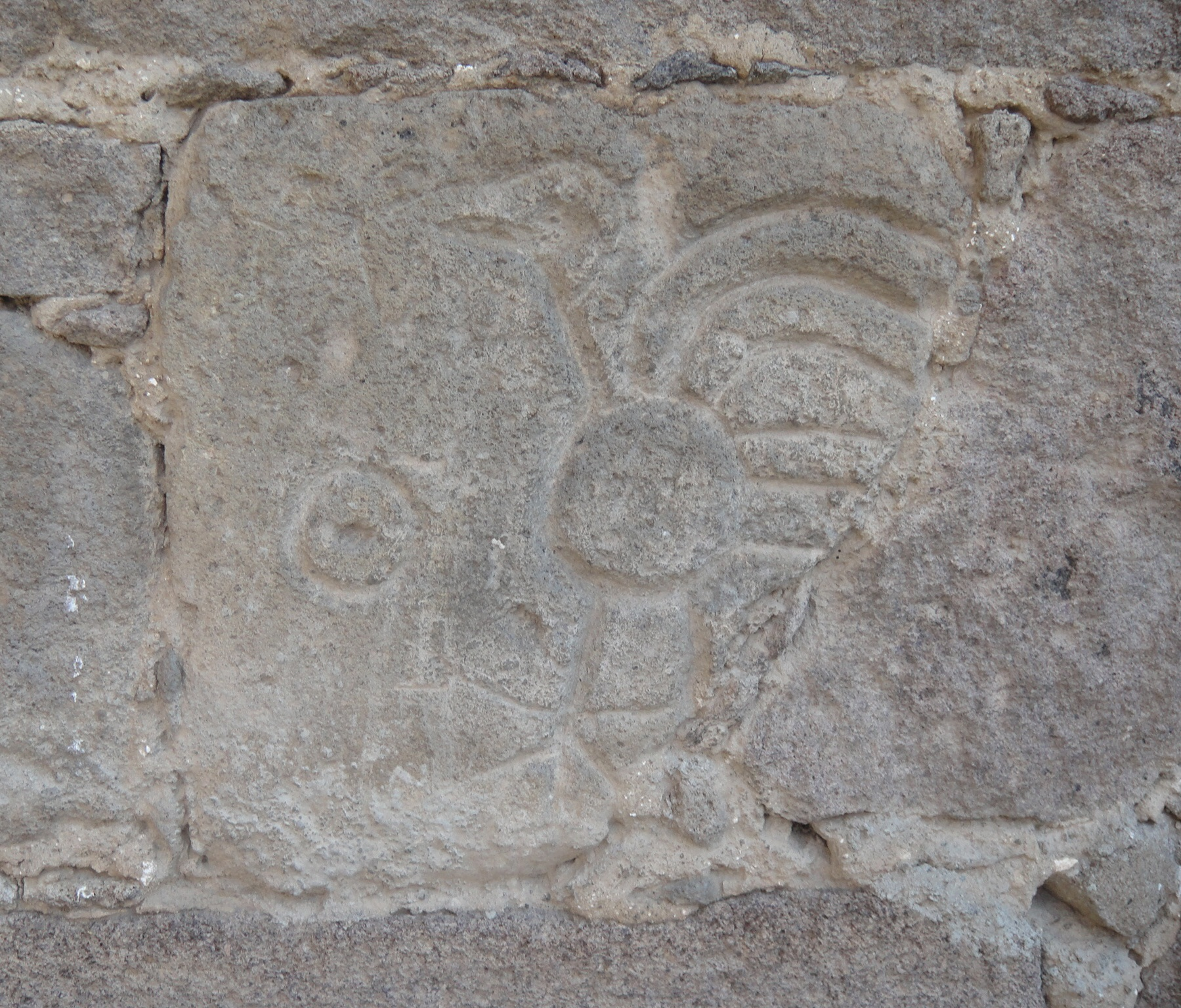

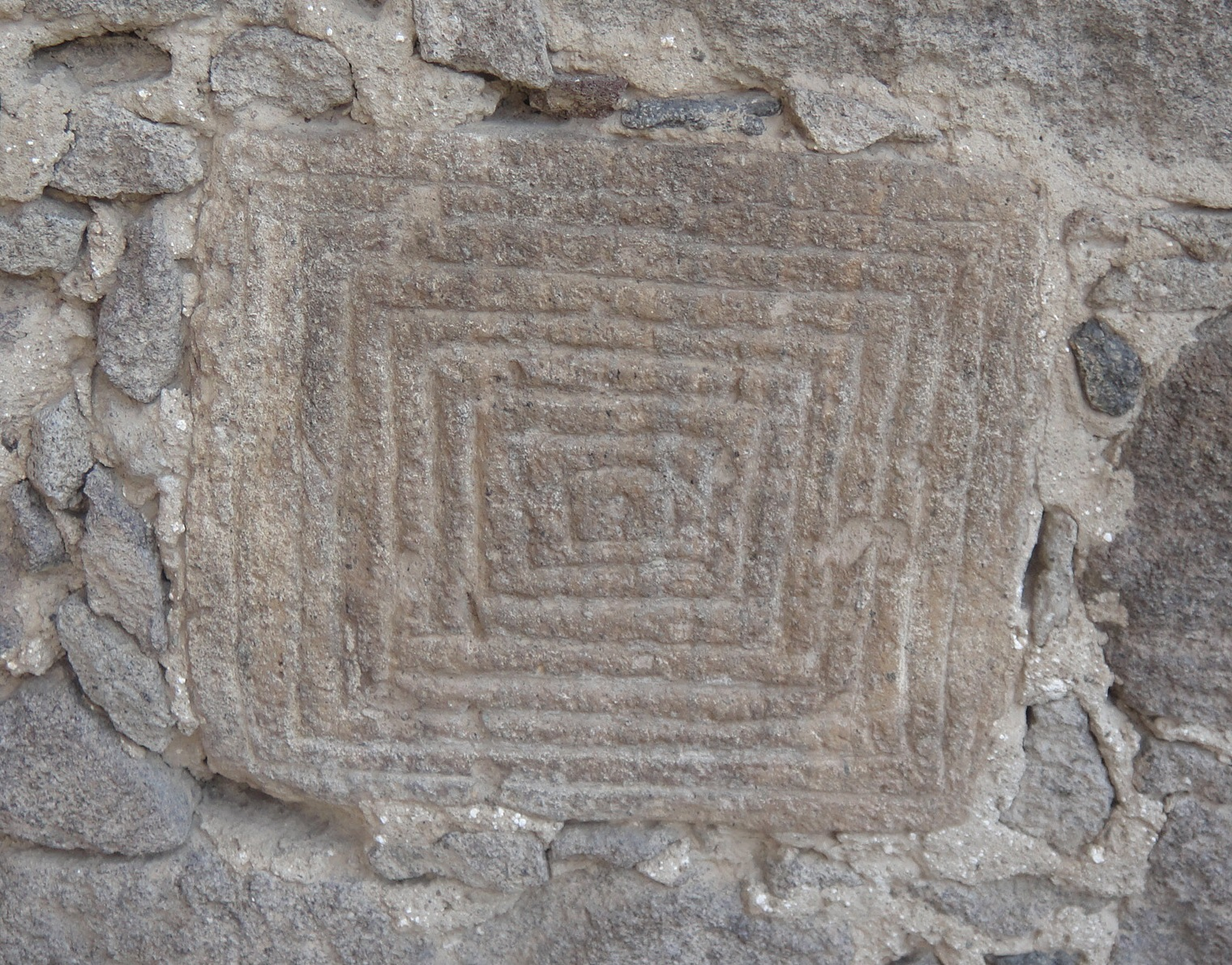

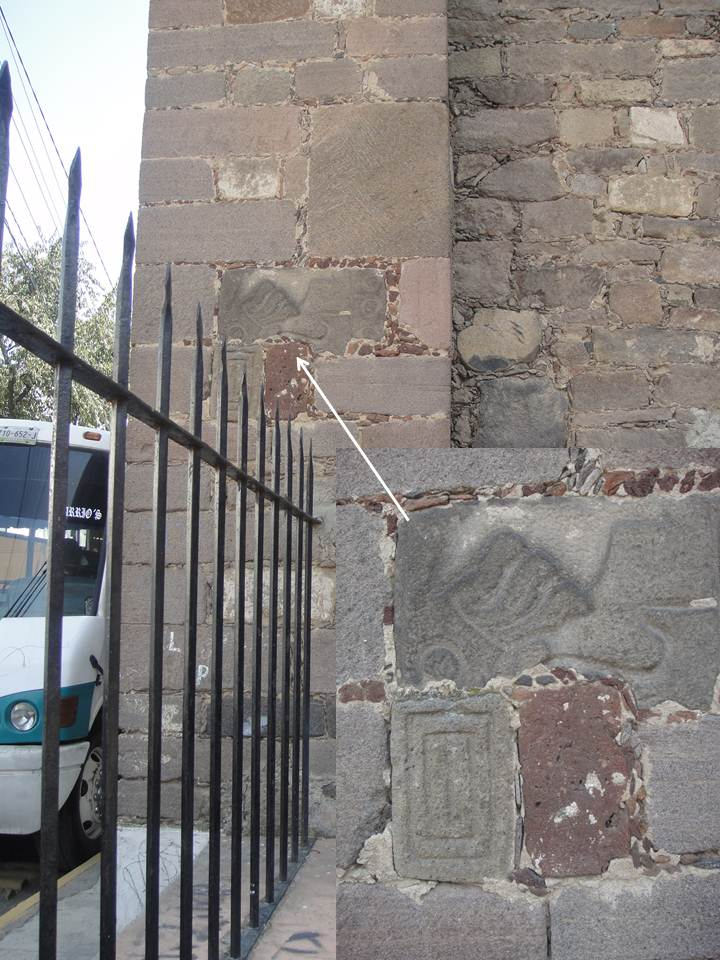

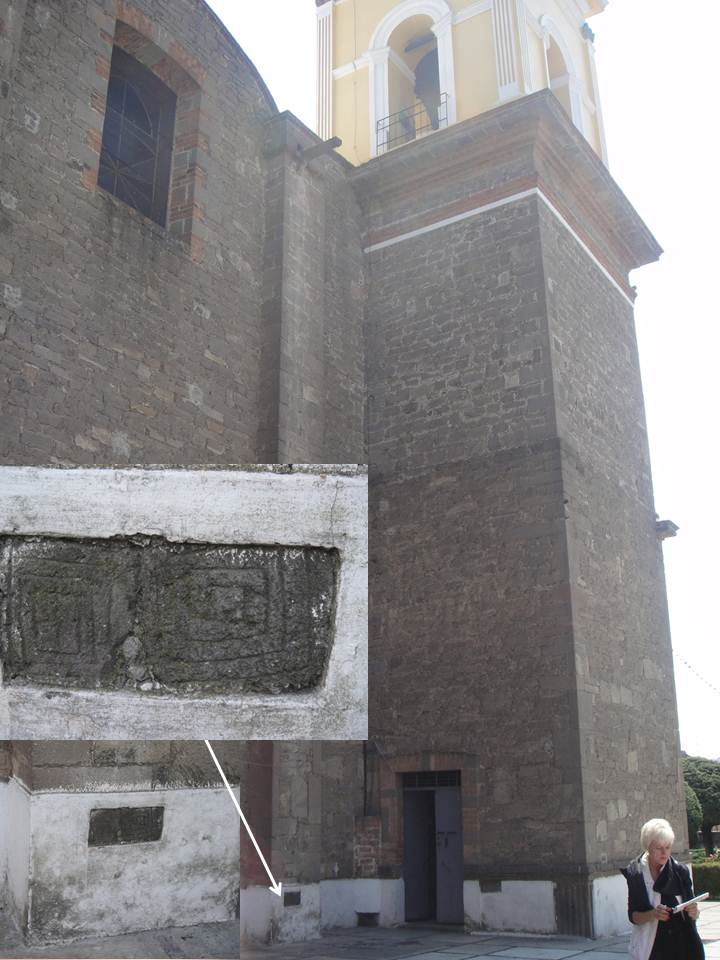
