= Human–dinosaur coexistence =

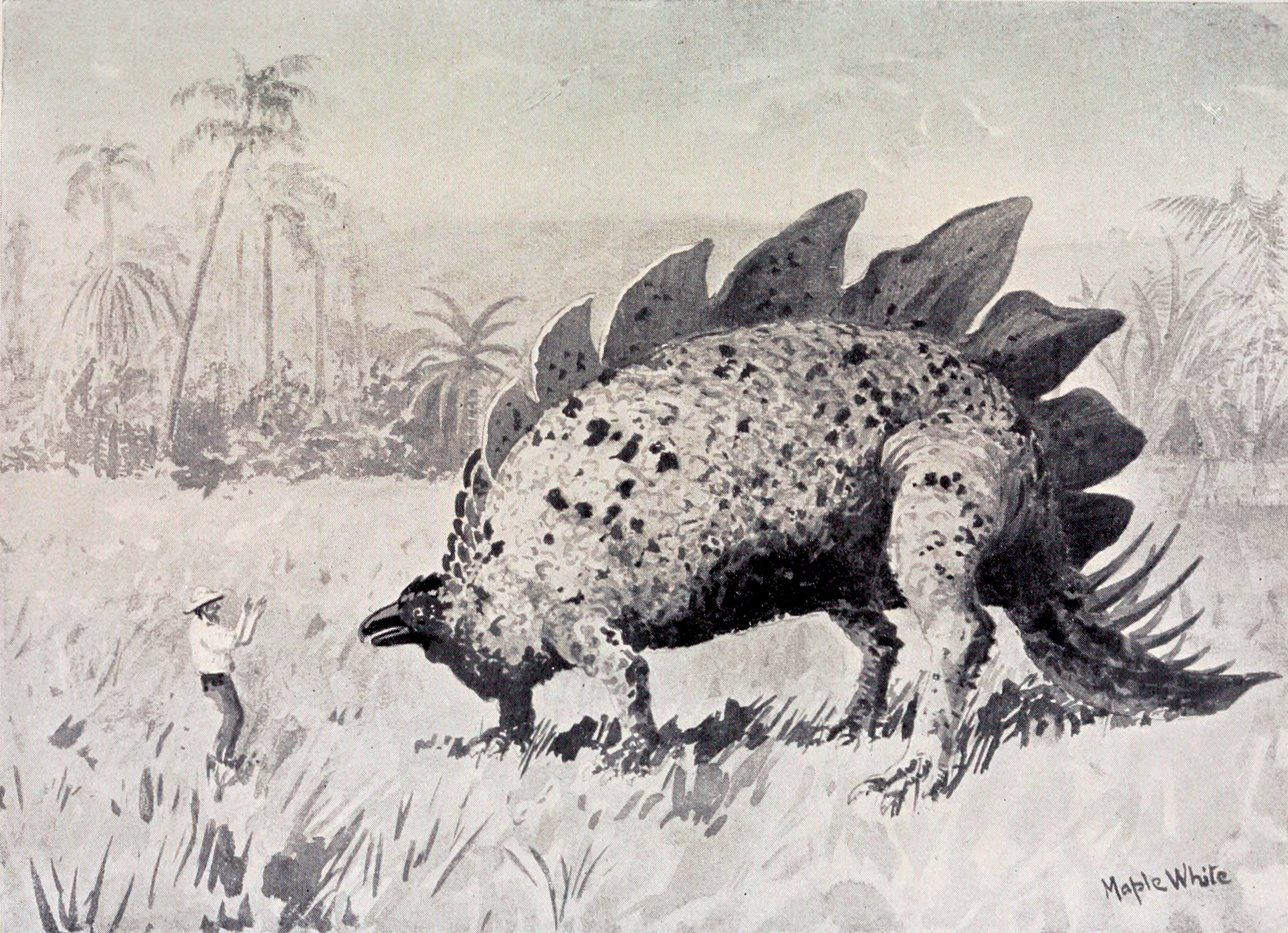
Illustration from the first edition of The Lost World (1912), depicting a human and an (outdated) Stegosaurus

The coexistence of humans and non-avian dinosaurs exists only as a recurring motif in speculative fiction, as humans and non-avian dinosaurs have never coexisted at any point in the history of Earth.

The notion that non-avian dinosaurs and humans actually coexisted at some time in the past or still coexist in the present is a belief rooted in pseudoscience and pseudohistory and is common among Young Earth creationists, cryptozoologists, and some other groups. This belief often contradicts the scientific understanding of the fossil record and known geological events. Supposed evidence presented for the idea that non-avian dinosaurs persisted to modern times has often been determined to have been a hoax. Some proponents have tried to identify depictions of dinosaurs among ancient artwork or descriptions of cryptids, though such identifications are often based on outdated or incorrect ideas about dinosaur biology and life appearance and often ignore the cultural/artistic context.

Scientists consider the claim that non-avian dinosaurs survived to the present day to be untenable, with known cases of so-called "living fossils" (such as coelacanths) far from analogous to large-bodied land vertebrates. The contemporary existence of non-avian dinosaurs would require unprecedented ghost lineages without fossils for tens of millions of years and would contrast sharply with the relatively good fossil record of dinosaurs and other groups in the Mesozoic.

== Birds ==
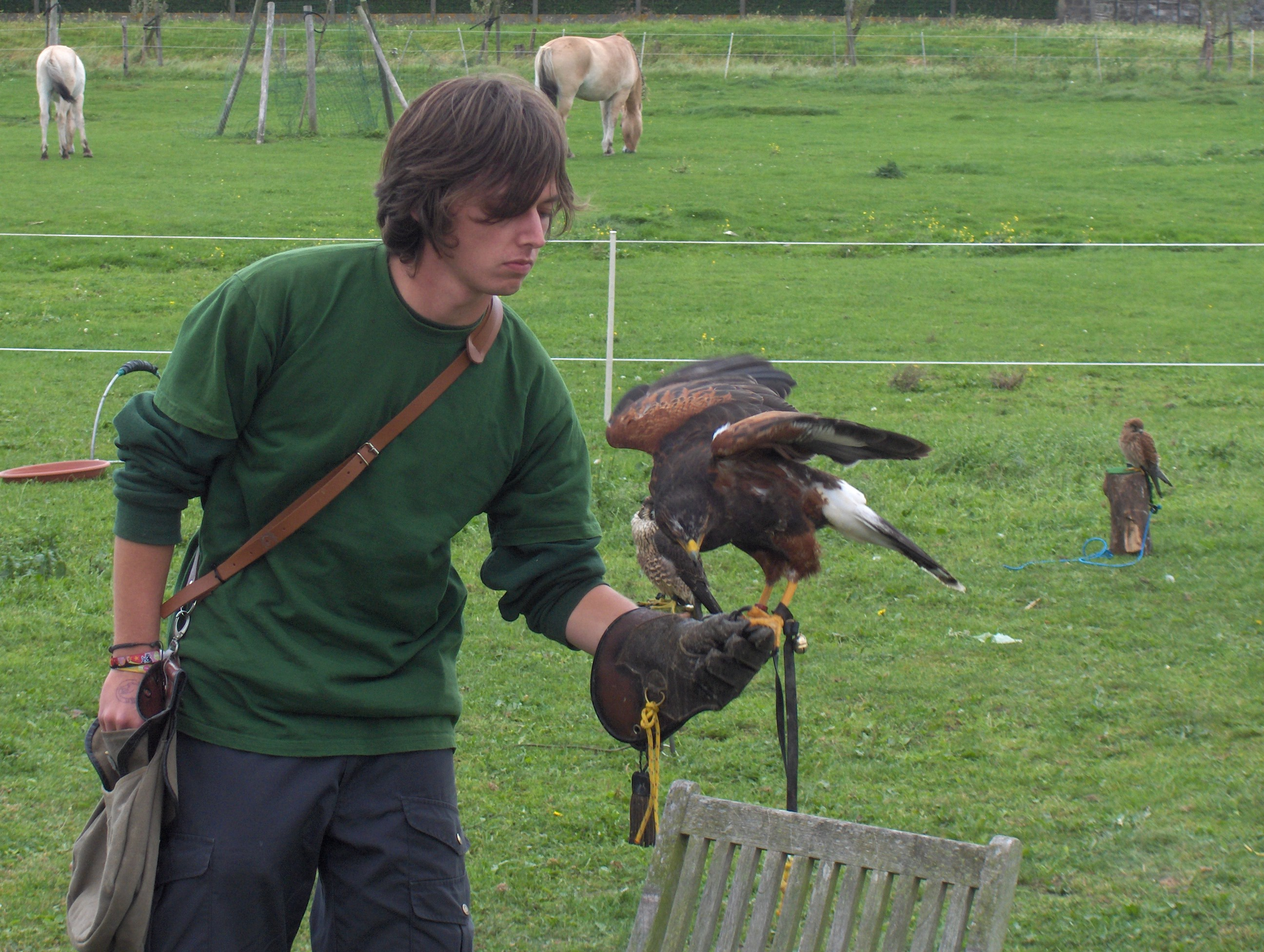
A falconer with a Harris's hawk (an avian dinosaur)

Birds evolved from a group of theropod dinosaurs (Paraves) during the Jurassic period. Modern birds are cladistically and phylogenetically dinosaurs, and humanity has thus coexisted with avian dinosaurs since the first humans appeared on Earth. However, in a narrow and more colloquial sense, the term "dinosaur" often refers specifically to non-avian dinosaurs, all of which died out in the Cretaceous–Paleogene extinction about 66 million years ago, while the genus Homo emerged only about 3 million years ago, leaving a period of tens of millions of years between the last dinosaurs and the first humans.

The most massive birds known to have coexisted with humans are the moa of New Zealand and the elephant birds of Madagascar. The largest moa, the South Island giant moa (Dinornis robustus), could reach heights of over 3.5 meters (11.5 feet). Both the moa and the elephant birds went extinct not long after humans arrived to their respective islands, likely as a result of human hunting. It is unclear if humans ever coexisted with the terror birds of South America since most (perhaps all) species appear to already have been extinct before humans arrived. The most massive avian dinosaur descendant alive today is the ostrich and the smallest is the bee hummingbird.

== Fiction and mythology ==
Speculative fiction commonly portrays non-avian dinosaurs with humans. Examples include the animated cartoon The Flintstones, in which Stone Age humans have dinosaurs as pets and transportation, and the comic series The Cavern Clan, in which the protagonist is a caveman who hunts dinosaurs, as well as in the comic strip Alley Oop. The coexistence has been present in works of alternative history in which dinosaurs do not go extinct, such as the 2015 Pixar film The Good Dinosaur and the fantasy book series Dinotopia.

Many Young Earth creationists believe that non-avian dinosaurs coexisted with humans. Since Young Earth creationists believe the Earth to only be a few thousand years old, their worldview is incompatible with the scientific understanding of geological history and the fossil record. Dinosaur fossils are by different groups of Young Earth creationists interpreted as hoaxes orchestrated by Satan or as the remains of creatures that cannot have lived as long ago as science has determined. The second explanation implies that dinosaurs could have coexisted with humans. Some creationists further believe that dinosaurs survived the Biblical flood since the Bible states that "every kind of land animal" did. Creationists also tend to reject the fossil evidence that many non-avian dinosaurs were feathered, since this is among the evidence that birds descended from them through evolution.

Some proponents have claimed that mythological reptiles such as dragons and the Behemoth are historical descriptions of dinosaurs. Although many modern depictions of dragons share certain similarities with dinosaurs, this is a recent artistic development spurred by the discovery of dinosaur fossils in the nineteenth century onwards. Earlier depictions of dragons tended to have far fewer such similarities, for instance being less bulky and more serpentine.

== Historical artwork and artifacts ==
=== Misinterpretations ===
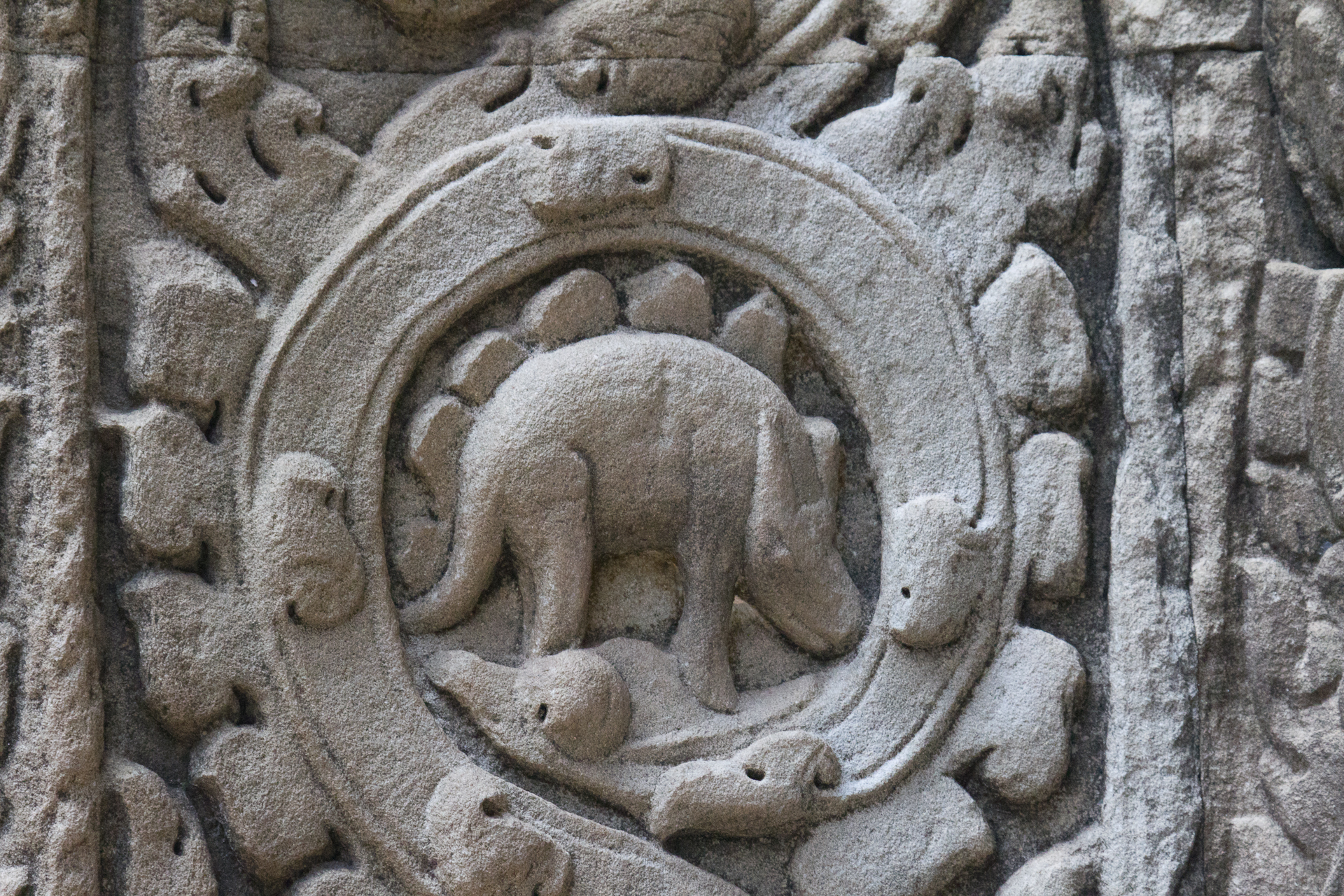
The "dinosaur of Ta Prohm", erroneously identified by some as a depiction of a stegosaur

In some cases, historical artwork has been interpreted as depicting non-avian dinosaurs. Although there is artwork that in cases share superficial resemblances with some dinosaur species, identifying them as such often involves ignoring both the context of the artwork itself and dinosaur biology. Some examples of historical art, particularly from Ancient Rome and Egypt, that has been interpreted as dinosaurian by pseudoscientists are conventionally seen as depictions of crocodiles.

An often cited example of a supposed non-avian dinosaur depicted in historical art is a hand-sized carving at Ta Prohm, allegedly of a stegosaur. The series of "plates" along the animal's back are however more likely to be stylized lotus leaves or petals, which are shown around numerous other animal and human figures in medieval Cambodian art, including in other carvings at the same temple. The creature is furthermore depicted with large ear flaps or horns, structures that are not known in stegosaurs.

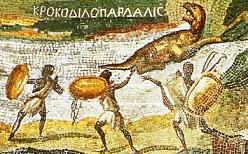
Humans hunting the "krokodilopardalis" in the Nile mosaic of Palestrina (1st century BCE)

Another example is a creature referred to as a krokodilopardalis ("crocodile leopard") in the 1st century BCE Nile mosaic of Palestrina. Some creationists have identified this creature as a theropod dinosaur, though the krokodilopardalis looks virtually nothing like one; it has a quadrupedal stance and clearly mammalian paws.

Some proponents of human and non-avian dinosaur coexistence have equated the Mesopotamian mušḫuššu, a legendary chimeric creature, with dinosaurs. Robert Koldewey, the discoverer of the Ishtar Gate in Babylon (which contains depictions of this creature), apparently had such ideas and found it to be similar to how Iguanodon was conceptualized at the time. Even some cryptozoologists reject this idea however, given that the mušḫuššu clearly combines various features of different animals in an arrangement not actually reminiscent of a dinosaur.

=== Hoaxes ===
==== Footprints ====
One claim made by some proponents of human-dinosaur coexistence is that non-avian dinosaur footprints have been found together with human footprints, with one particular site of note being Paluxy River in Texas. The supposed human tracks in the rock have all been identified to consist of dinosaur tracks eroded to an elongated shape and deliberate hoaxes. There have been documented cases of Young Earth creationists covering up portions of the dinosaur tracks with sand, photographing them, and reproducing the (often low-quality) photographs in print and film.

During the Great Depression, some footprints carved to resemble human feet were sold to tourists in the vicinity of the Paluxy River tracksite; these were recognized as fakes by the paleontologist Roland T. Bird, though helped him to discover the original tracksite in 1940.

==== Artifacts ====
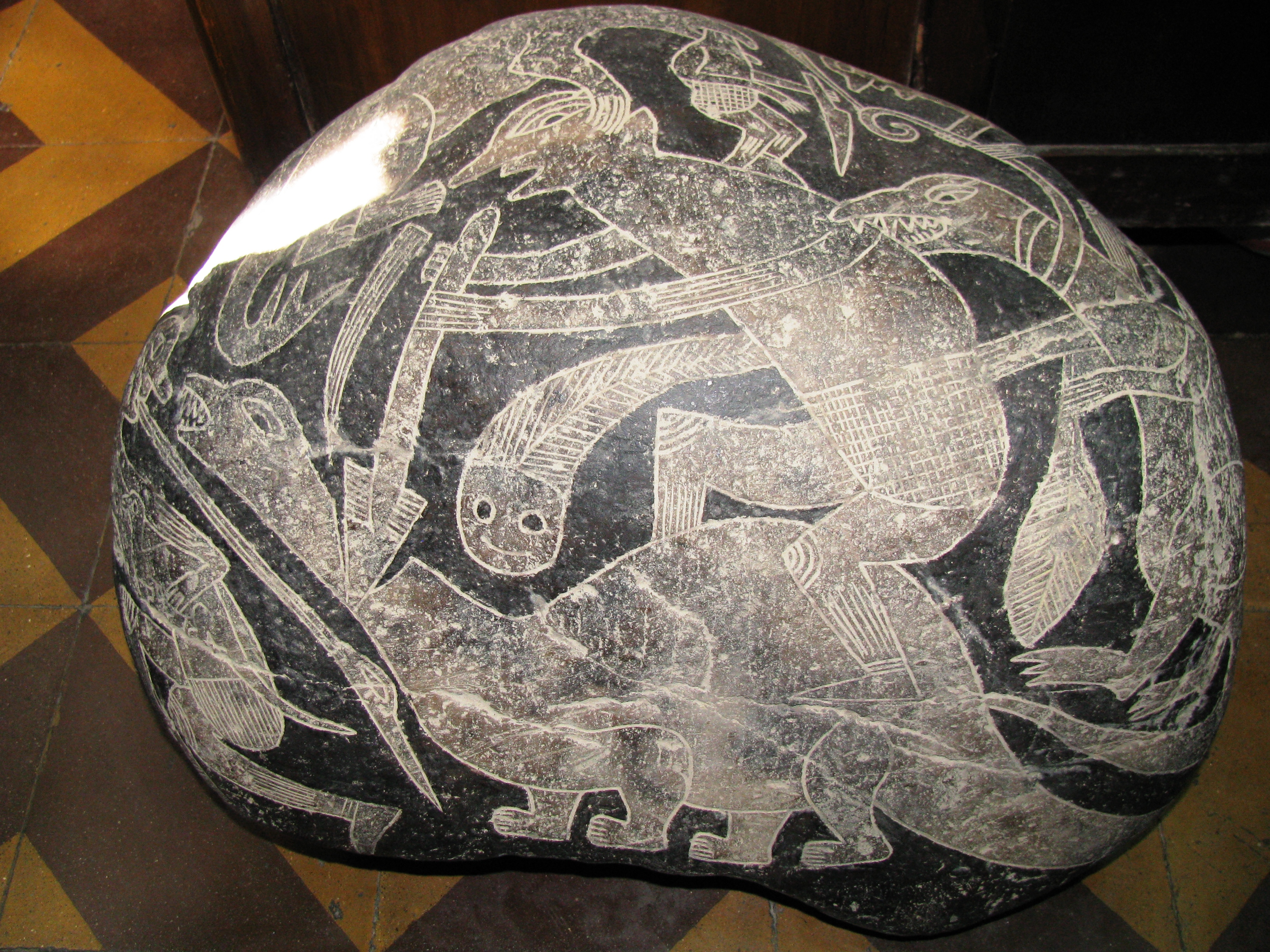
One of the Ica stones, featuring outdated depictions of a theropod (right; notably upright and dragging its tail on the ground) and sauropod (bottom)

Many hoaxes have been presented as historical depictions of dinosaurs and have been used as evidence for the idea that non-avian dinosaurs coexisted with humans. Notable such "artifacts" include the Granby Stone Idol (a known hoax depicting a sauropod together with incorrectly rendered Chinese symbols), the Acámbaro figures (a large set of dinosaur-like figurines now known to have been made shortly before their supposed discovery), the Ica stones (stones with dinosaurs carved on them, admitted to have been hoaxed by their creator), and the Tucson artifacts (which include a sword inscribed with a dinosaur, exposed as a hoax for decades).

Even though virtually all such objects have been exposed as hoaxes, many continue to erroneously be used as "evidence". Several hoaxes depicting dinosaurs reflect outdated understandings of the animals. Among the dinosaurs on the Ica stones is for instance a Tyrannosaurus rex, though shown nearly upright with its tail dragging behind it on the ground. This depiction is in-line with how T. rex was depicted in the 1960s (when the stones were "found") but does not reflect current scientific understanding. Tyrannosaurs are also unknown from South America, where the large carnivorous dinosaurs were megaraptorans and abelisaurs.

== Cryptozoology ==
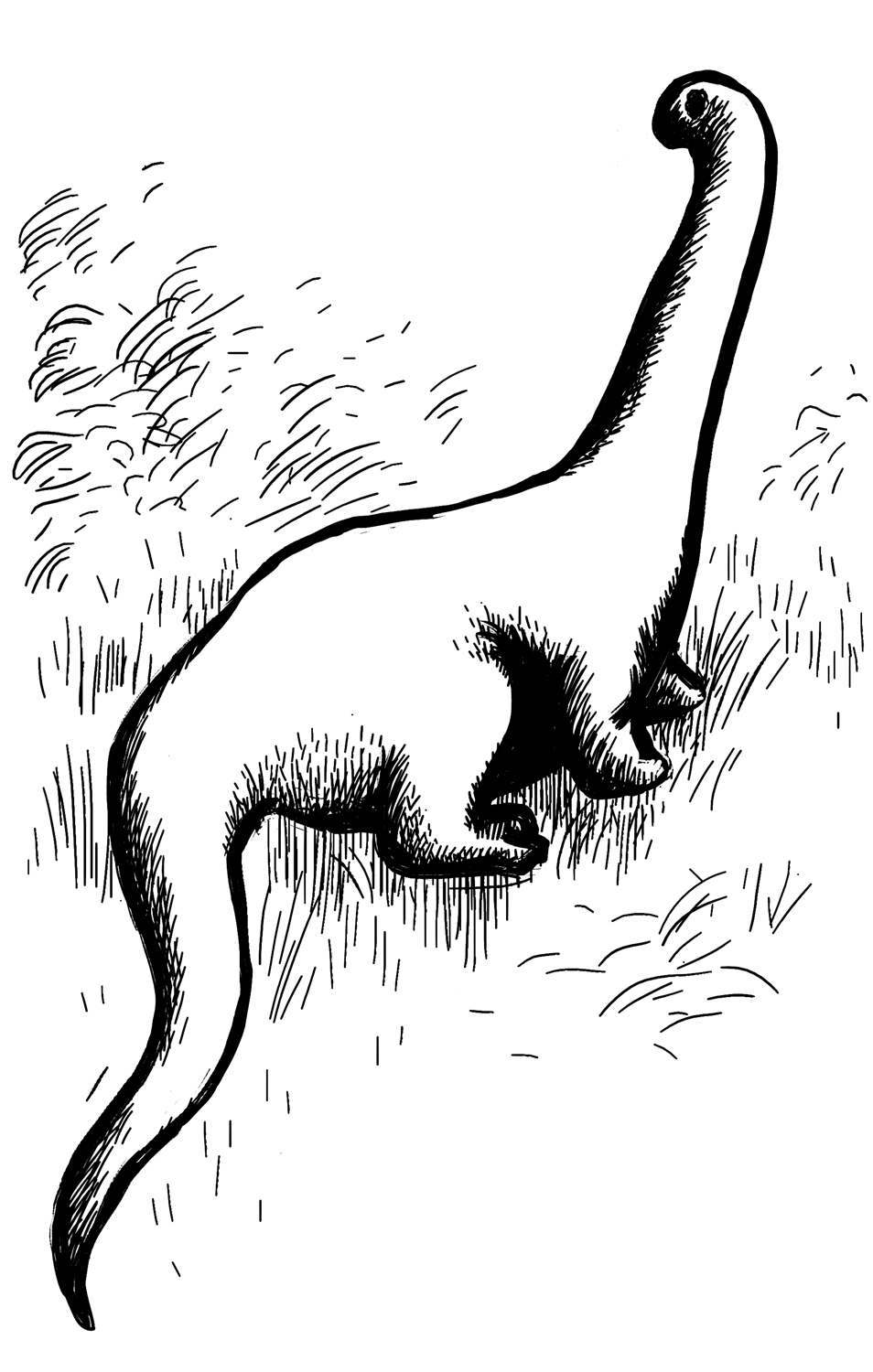
Mokèlé-mbèmbé is a mythical water-dwelling entity that is believed to exist in the Congo River Basin.

Many cryptids have been suggested by cryptozoologists to be living representatives or descendants of various extinct animals, including non-avian dinosaurs. The suggested scenarios for how such organisms are supposed to have survived are often highly flawed, contradicting the abundant data on known geological events and the fossil record. The supposed identifications are also often only based on reconstructions of extinct organisms, consequently limiting them to species often appearing in popular literature as well as views on them now considered to be outdated. As a general example, cryptozoological identifications of various supposed lake monsters often default to identifying them as living plesiosaurs, despite numerous other groups both extinct and extant being more similar in appearance and biology.

One of the more well-known "dinosaur cryptids" is Mokele-mbembe, said to dwell in the Congo River and identified by some cryptozoologists as a possible sauropod. Mokele-mbembe is said to be an amphibious swamp-dweller. This reflects outdated popular views of sauropods common in the twentieth century and presumably stems from artistic depictions in that time, though shares little resemblance with the lifestyle modern research suggests sauropods had. Some researchers have raised concerns that the idea of a "living dinosaur in darkest Africa" is intertwined with the racist ideologies that were once used to justify the colonization of the continent in that it paints Africa as a land still stuck in premodern times, ripe for exploration by more "scientifically advanced" foreigners.

Similarly, some cryptozoologists have also suggested that several Native American legends concerning horned water monsters are identifiable with crested hadrosaurs, with the horns equated with their crests. This identification derives from the outdated idea that hadrosaurs were amphibious, common in the twentieth century but now discredited.

== See also ==
- List of topics characterized as pseudoscience
- Cultural depictions of dinosaurs
- Human uses of birds
