= Dinosaur of Ta Prohm =

Khmer bas-relief in Siem Reap

Coordinates: 13.434°N 103.889°E

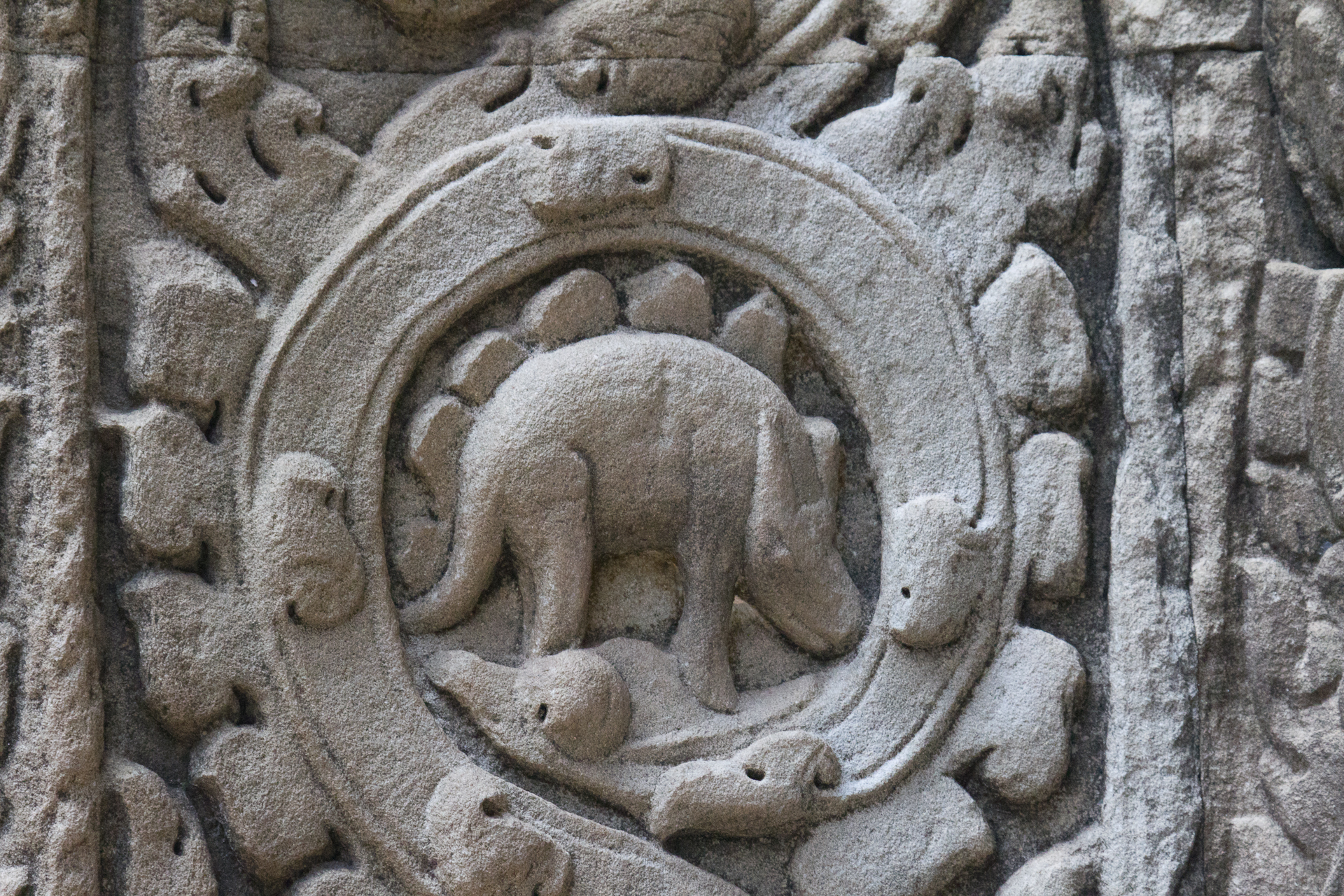
The "dinosaur" relief

The "dinosaur of Ta Prohm" is a bas-relief in the Khmer Empire temple-monastery of Ta Prohm. Numerous reliefs of various animals are present in the temple; the "dinosaur" is one of its more ambiguous artworks. The relief first gained modern notoriety in the late 1990s when the lobe-like features running down the animal's back were compared to the back plates of stegosaurian dinosaurs. The relief has since become a popular piece of "evidence" for the fringe belief that non-avian dinosaurs once coexisted with humans.

There is no academic consensus on what animal is depicted. The supposed back plates are likely stylized background foliage, present in many of the other reliefs at the temple. Other than this feature, the animal bears little resemblance to stegosaurs and instead possesses marked anatomical differences, such as in the proportions and features of its head and in its lack of a thagomizer (tail spikes). Some of its anatomical features have been compared to chameleons and rhinoceroses. It is not certain that the relief was intended to depict a real animal at all, since some reliefs in the temple depict mythical creatures. Since Ta Prohm is a popular site for film crews, it has also been suggested that the relief could be a modern hoax.

== History ==
The bas-relief is located in the temple-monastery of Ta Prohm in Cambodia. Within the temple, it is found in Gopura III, east of the main sanctuary. It is one of several roundels in a vertical strip of reliefs between the east wall of the main body of the gopura and the south wall of the porch.

Ta Prohm was constructed in the late 12th century under Jayavarman VII of the Khmer Empire and was dedicated in honor of his mother, Sri Jayarajacudamani, in 1186. Ta Prohm is decorated with numerous bas-reliefs, depicting various animals and mythical figures. Many of the animals can be identified but some are more ambiguous, such as the "dinosaur". When exactly the relief was carved is unknown; the temple in later times saw phases of being damaged, expanded, and modified. After the fall of the Khmer Empire in the 15th century, Ta Prohm and other temples were mostly left abandoned and neglected. Unlike some other temples, Ta Prohm has seen only little modern restoration work.

The "dinosaur" relief first gained widespread recognition in modern times when its strange appearance was pointed out in a 1997 guidebook, Angkor Cities and Temples by Michael Freeman and Claude Jacques. In their later 1999 book, Ancient Angkor, Freeman and Jacques again highlighted the relief and referred to it as "a very convincing representation of a stegosaur".

== Description ==
The animal depicted in the relief has a convex-shaped back, lined with a series of ornaments superficially reminiscent of the plates of stegosaurian dinosaurs. It is likely that these supposed plates are meant to be stylized lotus leaves or petals, which are also featured in nearby reliefs and throughout the temple's artwork, sometimes in a nearly identical manner. The ornamentations of reliefs depicting a water buffalo and a bird have for instance been identified as nearly identical; in these cases, the ornamentation is clearly not meant to represent back plates.

== Identification ==
=== Conventional identifications ===
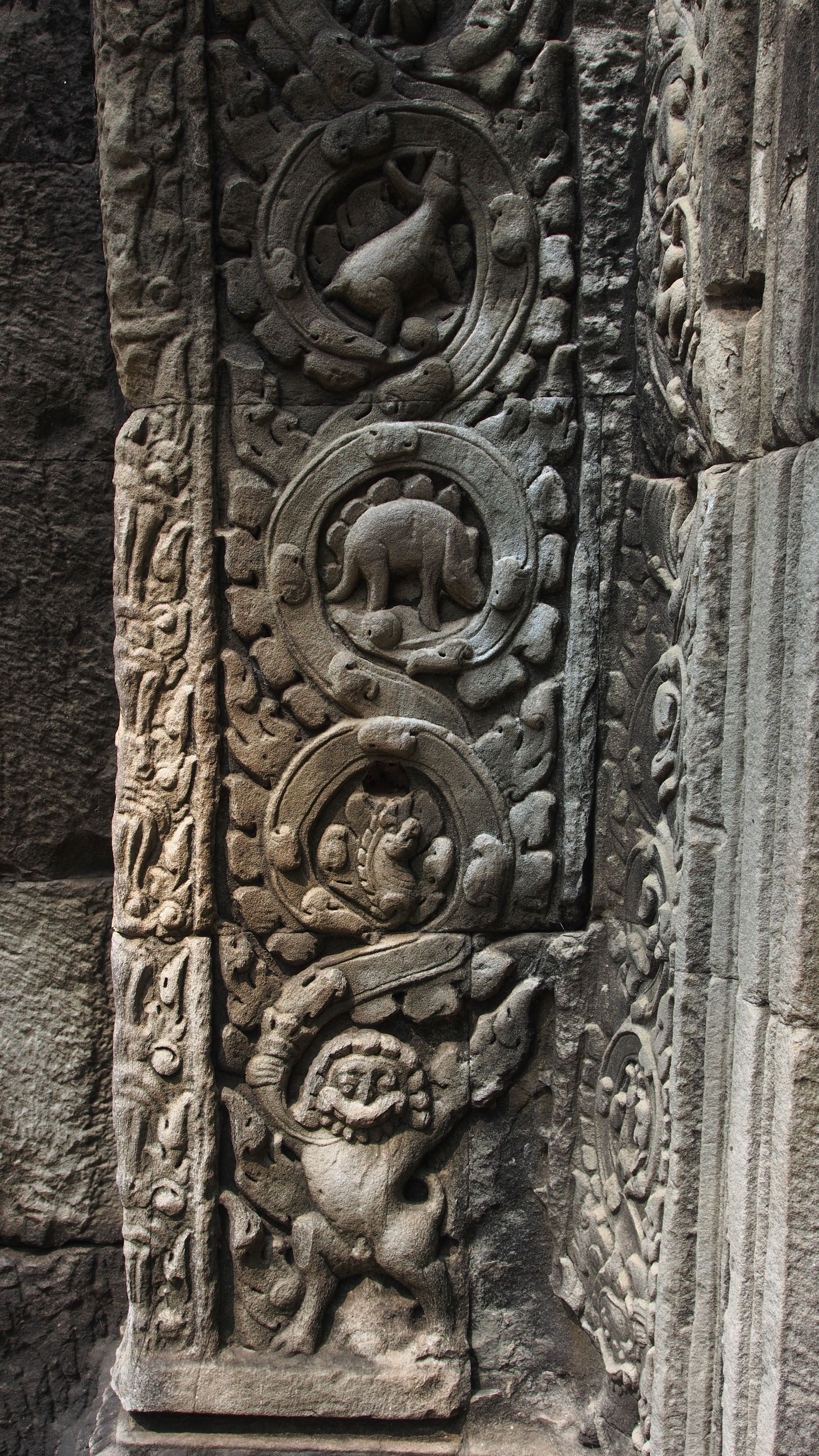
The "stegosaur" in context; note the presence of stylized leaves or petals throughout and the mythical creature at the bottom

The relief has garnered relatively little scientific interest. Conventional identifications of the animal depicted, taking into account the likelihood that the "plates" are stylized background foliage, include a chameleon, a mountain horned lizard, a rhinoceros, a water buffalo, or a boar. Although the head anatomy corresponds to that of a rhinoceros, the animal lacks a nose horn. It is possible that it originally had a horn that later weathered away or that the species depicted is one with a much less pronounced horn, such as the Bornean rhinoceros, historically present in Cambodia. The arched back and large tail have been interpreted by some as more suggestive of a chameleon. It is also possible that the animal is a mythical one since other mythical creatures are depicted elsewhere in the temple, including very close to the "dinosaur"; the relief at the bottom of the same strip is a mythical dog-like creature with the head of a human or monkey.

Another possibility is that the relief was either made or altered by a modern hoaxer. Ta Prohm is often used by film crews and this particular image could have been carved as a joke. The relief is lighter than the surrounding carvings, which could suggest that it was made or altered relatively recently. Alternatively, this could have resulted from it being cleaned or from visitors making molds of it.

=== Fringe theories ===
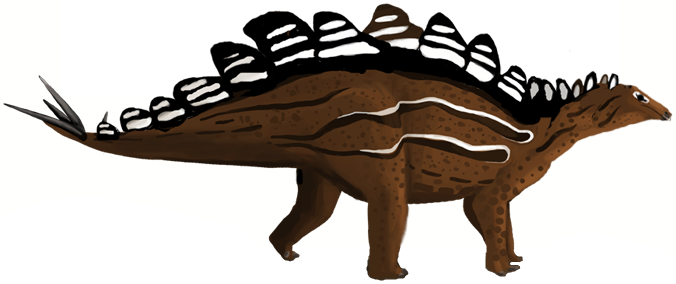
Reconstruction of Stegosaurus; the animal in the relief differs in several notable aspects, including the head, neck, limb and tail anatomy, the number and arrangement of "plates", and the lack of a thagomizer (tail spikes)

Some adherents of fringe theories, such as Young Earth creationists and cryptozoologists, have put forth the "dinosaur" of Ta Prohm as evidence that humans and non-avian dinosaurs once coexisted. The relief has been widely publicized online, particularly on websites and blogs by creationists, including by the major creationist organization Answers in Genesis. A replica of the relief is exhibited at the Creation Evidence Museum of Texas, where the conclusion that it represents a stegosaur is strongly encouraged.

All dinosaur lineages other than birds went extinct during the Cretaceous–Paleogene extinction event, 66 million years ago. The complete absence of non-avian dinosaur fossils in Cenozoic layers contrasts sharply with the good record of the group in Mesozoic layers and their survival would require ghost lineages on an unprecedented scale. Stegosaurs appear to have been declining already in the Early Cretaceous. They may have gone extinct prior to the extinction event since no certain stegosaurian fossils are known from the Late Cretaceous.

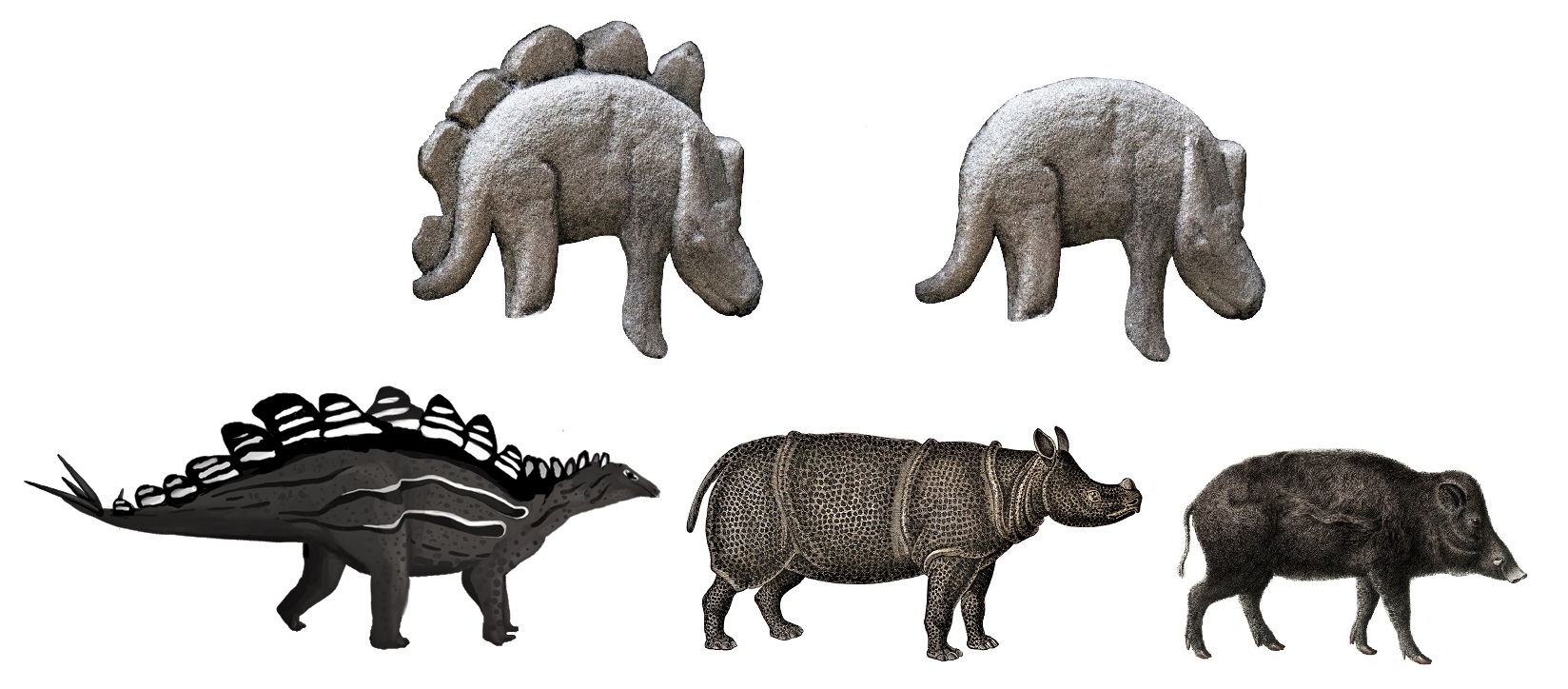
Comparative illustration of the creature with a Stegosaurus, a Javan rhinoceros and a wild boar

There is no evidence that the animal depicted is a stegosaurian dinosaur. The Khmer Empire was an advanced, highly populous, and literate society. It is unlikely that the presence of stegosaurs in Cambodia only a few centuries ago would not have been documented in any other way than through a single relief in a temple. Beyond the superficial resemblance of the plates, the animal also shares few similarities with stegosaurs. Even if interpreted as plates, the structures along the animal's back do not resemble stegosaurian plates, which were greater in number and placed in two rows. The animal is depicted with two large structures on the back of its head, either horns (not known from any stegosaur) or large ear flaps (which would suggest that it is a mammal). It is also depicted with a short neck, a wide snout and a large head. These features correspond to rhinoceros anatomy and are very different from the long neck, pointed and narrow snout, and small heads of stegosaurs. The animal has front and back legs of around the same size, whereas stegosaurs had back legs significantly larger than their front legs. The tail appears to be very low to the ground whereas dinosaurs are now known to have held their tails well above the ground. The animal does not have a thagomizer (tail spikes), one of the most striking and unique features of stegosaurs.
