= Ta Prohm =

Buddhist temple in Siem Reap, Cambodia

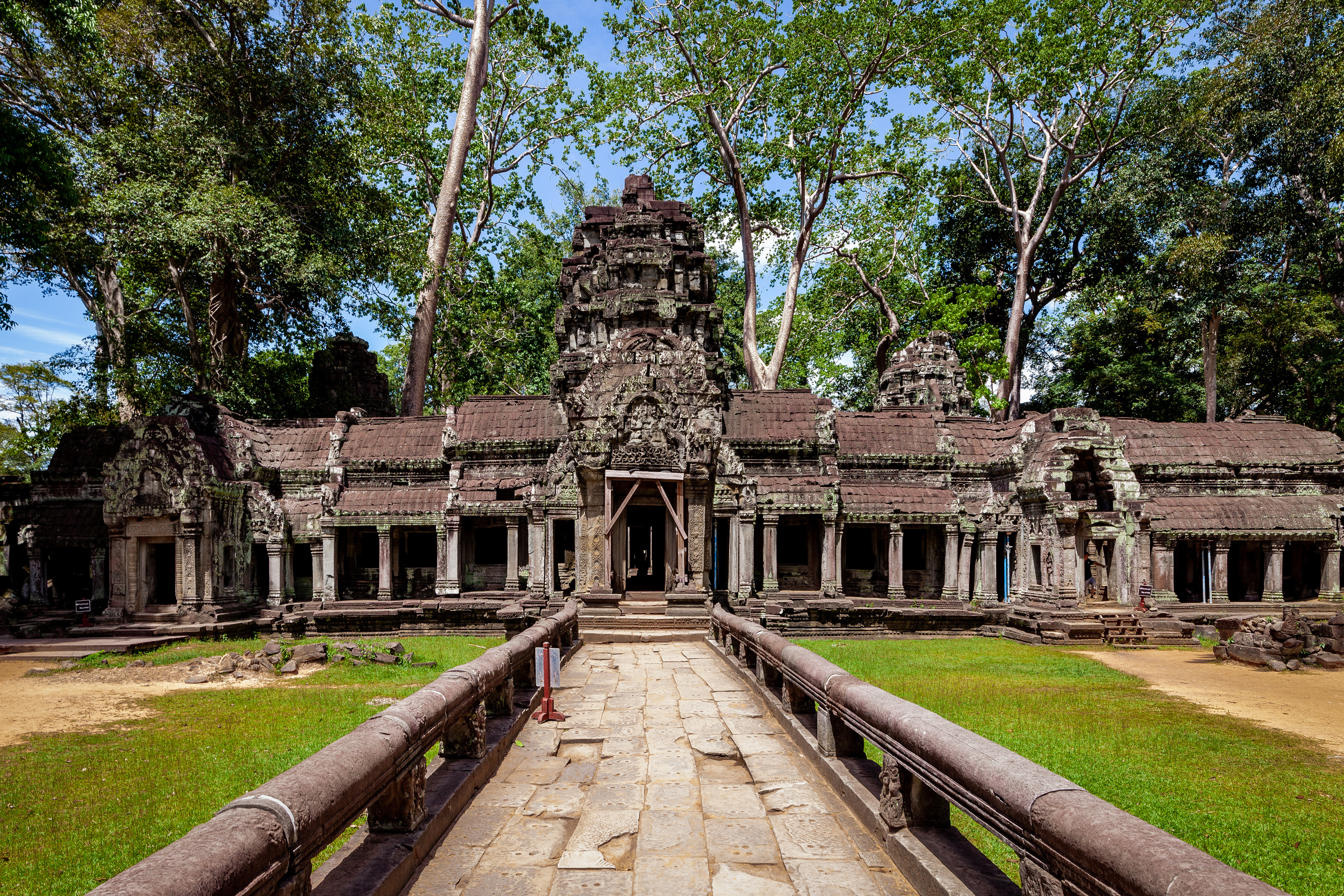

- Location in Cambodia

Religion
- Affiliation: Buddhism
- Sect: Mahayana
- Province: Siem Reap
- Deity: Prajnaparamita

Location
- Location: Angkor
- Country: Cambodia
- Coordinates: 13°26′06″N 103°53′21″E

Architecture
- Founder: Jayavarman VII
- Completed: 1186; 840 years ago

Ta Prohm (Khmer: ប្រាសាទតាព្រហ្ម, UNGEGN: Ta Prŭm, ALA-LC: Tā Brahm [taː prom]; "Ancestor Brahma") is the modern name of a temple near the city of Siem Reap, Cambodia, approximately one kilometre east of Angkor Thom and on the southern edge of the East Baray. It was built in the Bayon style largely in the late 12th century and early 13th century and was originally called Rajavihara (Khmer: រាជវិហារ, UNGEGN: Riach Vĭhia, ALA-LC: Rājvihār [riəc.vihiə]; "Royal Monastery"). It was founded by the Khmer King Jayavarman VII as a Mahayana Buddhist monastery and center of learning dedicated to his mother. Almost 80,000 people were required to maintain or attend at the temple, including over 2,700 officials and 615 dancers.

The temple is referred to as the "Tomb Raider Temple" or the "Angelina Jolie Temple" due to its depiction in the film Lara Croft: Tomb Raider (2001).

The temple was built without mortar and, after it was abandoned, trees took root in the loosened stones. The trees growing out of the ruins and the jungle surroundings have made it one of the most popular temples with visitors to the area. It has been on the UNESCO World Heritage List since 1992.

== History ==
=== Foundation and expansion ===
In 1186 A.D., Jayavarman VII embarked on a massive program of construction and public works. Rajavihara ("monastery of the king"), today known as Ta Prohm ("ancestor Brahma"), was one of the first temples founded pursuant to that program. The stele commemorating the foundation gives a date of 1186 A.D.

Jayavarman VII constructed Rajavihara in honour of his family. The temple's main image, representing Prajnaparamita, the personification of wisdom, was modelled on the king's mother. The northern and southern satellite temples in the third enclosure were dedicated to the king's guru, Jayamangalartha, and his elder brother respectively. As such, Ta Prohm formed a complementary pair with the temple monastery of Preah Khan, dedicated in 1191 A.D., the main image of which represented the Bodhisattva of compassion Lokesvara and was modelled on the king's father.

The temple's stele records that the site was home to more than 12,500 people (including 18 high priests and 615 dancers), with an additional 80,000 inhabitants in the surrounding villages working to provide services and supplies. The stele also notes that the temple amassed considerable riches, including gold, pearls, and silks. Expansions and additions to Ta Prohm continued as late as the rule of Srindravarman at the end of the 13th century.

=== Abandonment and restoration ===
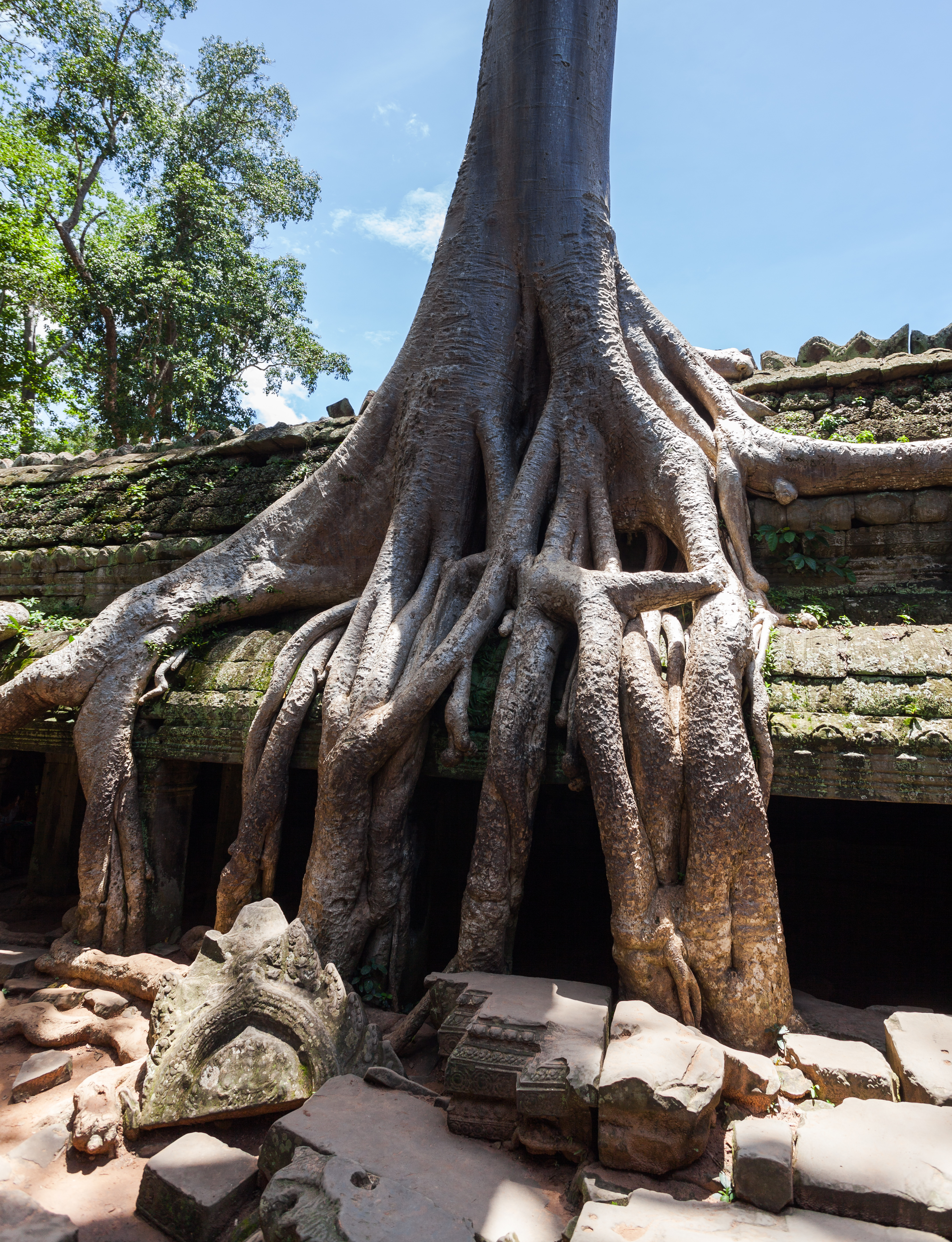
Roots of a spung running along the gallery of the second enclosure.

After the fall of the Khmer Empire in the 15th century, the temple of Ta Prohm was abandoned and neglected for centuries. When the effort to conserve and restore the temples of Angkor began in the early 20th century, the École française d'Extrême-Orient decided that Ta Prohm would be left largely as it had been found, as a "concession to the general taste for the picturesque." According to pioneering Angkor scholar Maurice Glaize, Ta Prohm was singled out because it was "one of the most imposing [temples] and the one which had best merged with the jungle, but not yet to the point of becoming a part of it". Nevertheless, much work has been done to stabilize the ruins, to permit access, and to maintain "this condition of apparent neglect."

In 1992, UNESCO inscribed Ta Prohm on the World Heritage List. The conservation and restoration of Ta Prohm is a partnership project of the Archaeological Survey of India and the APSARA (Authority for the Protection and Management of Angkor and the Region of Siem Reap).

By 2013, the Archaeological Survey of India restored most parts of the temple complex, some of which were constructed from scratch. Wooden walkways, platforms, and roped railings were put in place around the site to protect the monument from further damages from tourists.

In November 2022, a renovation of the Hall of Dancers was completed.

== The site ==
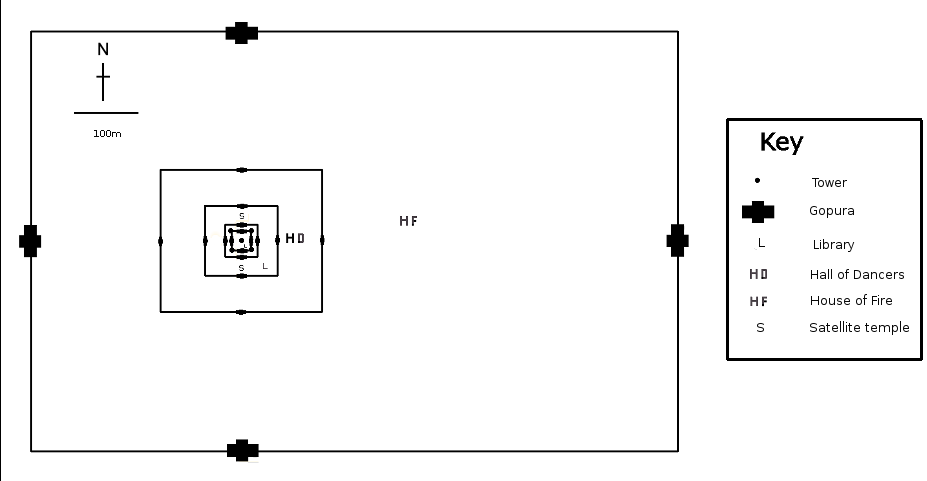
Plan of the temple, showing the relative locations of the main features.

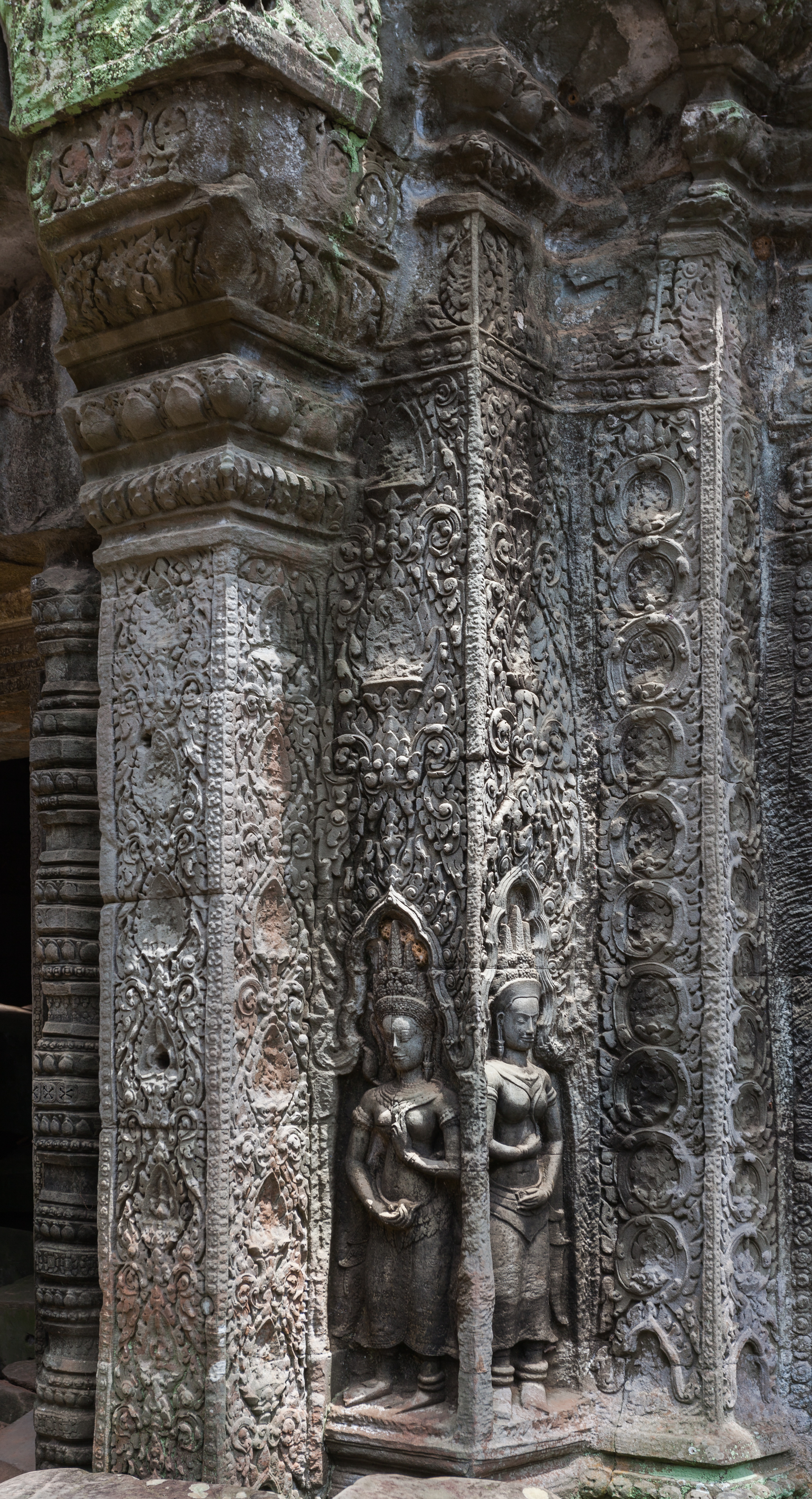
Bas relief on Ta Prohm wall

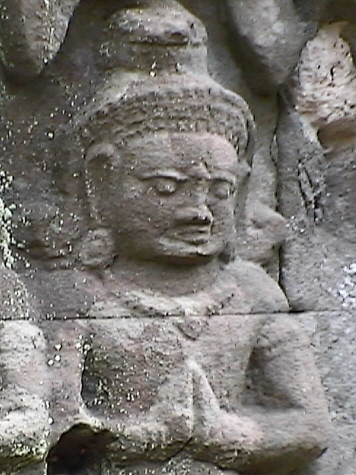
A bas-relief over an entrance at Ta Prohm includes this intense meditating or praying figure.

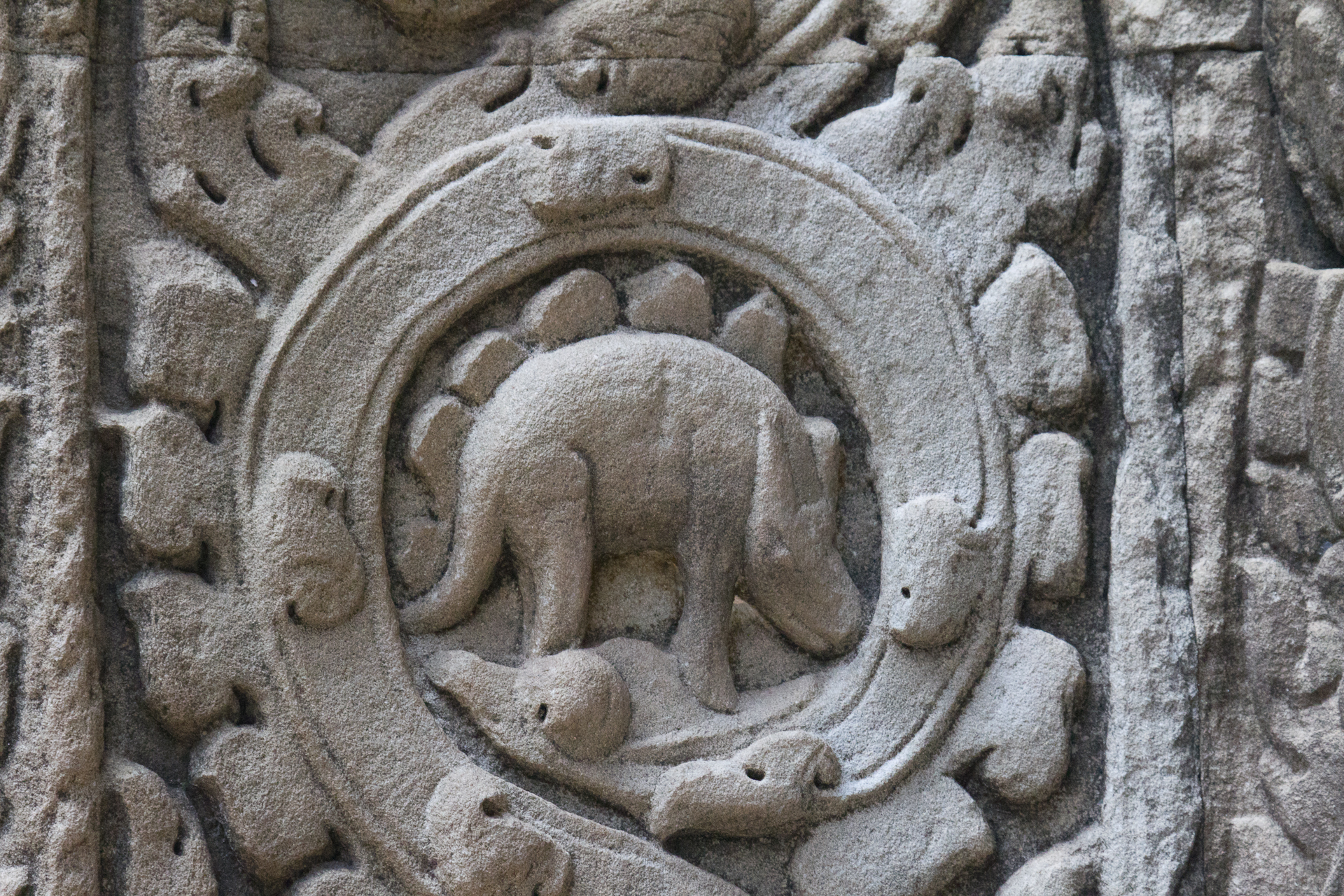
The "dinosaur of Ta Prohm", one of the reliefs of the temple popular in pseudoscience

=== Layout ===
The design of Ta Prohm is that of a typical "flat" Khmer temple, as opposed to a temple-pyramid or temple-mountain, the inner levels of which are higher than the outer. Five rectangular enclosing walls surround a central sanctuary. The sanctuary is centered around the stone face of Prajnaparamita, the personification of wisdom, modeled after the king's mother. Like most Khmer temples, Ta Prohm is oriented to the east, so the temple proper is set back to the west along an elongated east–west axis. The outer wall of 1000 by 650 metres encloses an area of 650,000 square metres that at one time would have been the site of a substantial town, but that is now largely forested. There are entrance gopuras at each of the cardinal points, although access today is now only possible from the east and west. In the 13th century, face towers similar to those found at the Bayon were added to the gopuras. Some of the face towers have collapsed. At one time, moats could be found inside and outside the fourth enclosure. The presence of two moats led some historians to speculate that the 12th/13th remain of Ta Prohm is an expansion of a more ancient Buddhist shrine on the same site.

The three inner enclosures of the temple proper are galleried, while the corner towers of the first enclosure form a quincunx with the tower of the central sanctuary. This basic plan is complicated for the visitor by the circuitous access necessitated by the temple's partially collapsed state, as well as by the large number of other buildings dotting the site, some of which represent later additions. The most substantial of these other buildings are the libraries in the southeast corners of the first and third enclosures; the satellite temples on the north and south sides of the third enclosure; the Hall of Dancers between the third and fourth eastern gopuras; and a House of Fire east of the fourth eastern gopura.

=== Representational art ===
Ta Prohm does not have many narrative bas-reliefs (as compared to Angkor Wat or Angkor Thom.) At any rate, some depictions of scenes from Buddhist mythology do remain. One badly eroded bas-relief illustrates the "Great Departure" of Siddhartha, the future Buddha, from his father's palace. The temple also features stone reliefs of devatas (minor female deities), meditating monks or ascetics, and dvarapalas or temple guardians.

=== Trees ===
The trees growing out of the ruins are perhaps the most distinctive feature of Ta Prohm, and "have prompted more writers to descriptive excess than any other feature of Angkor." Two species predominate, but sources disagree on their identification: the larger is either the silk-cotton tree (Ceiba pentandra) or thitpok Tetrameles nudiflora, and the smaller is either the strangler fig (Ficus gibbosa) or gold apple (Diospyros decandra). Angkor scholar Maurice Glaize observed, "On every side, in fantastic over-scale, the trunks of the silk-cotton trees soar skywards under a shadowy green canopy, their long spreading skirts trailing the ground and their endless roots coiling more like reptiles than plants."

== In popular media ==
Ta Prohm was used as a location in the film Lara Croft: Tomb Raider (2001). In the film, Lara Croft, played by Angelina Jolie, picked a jasmine flower and then fell through the earth into the temple, with the forthcoming scenes filmed at Pinewood Studios.

== Gallery ==
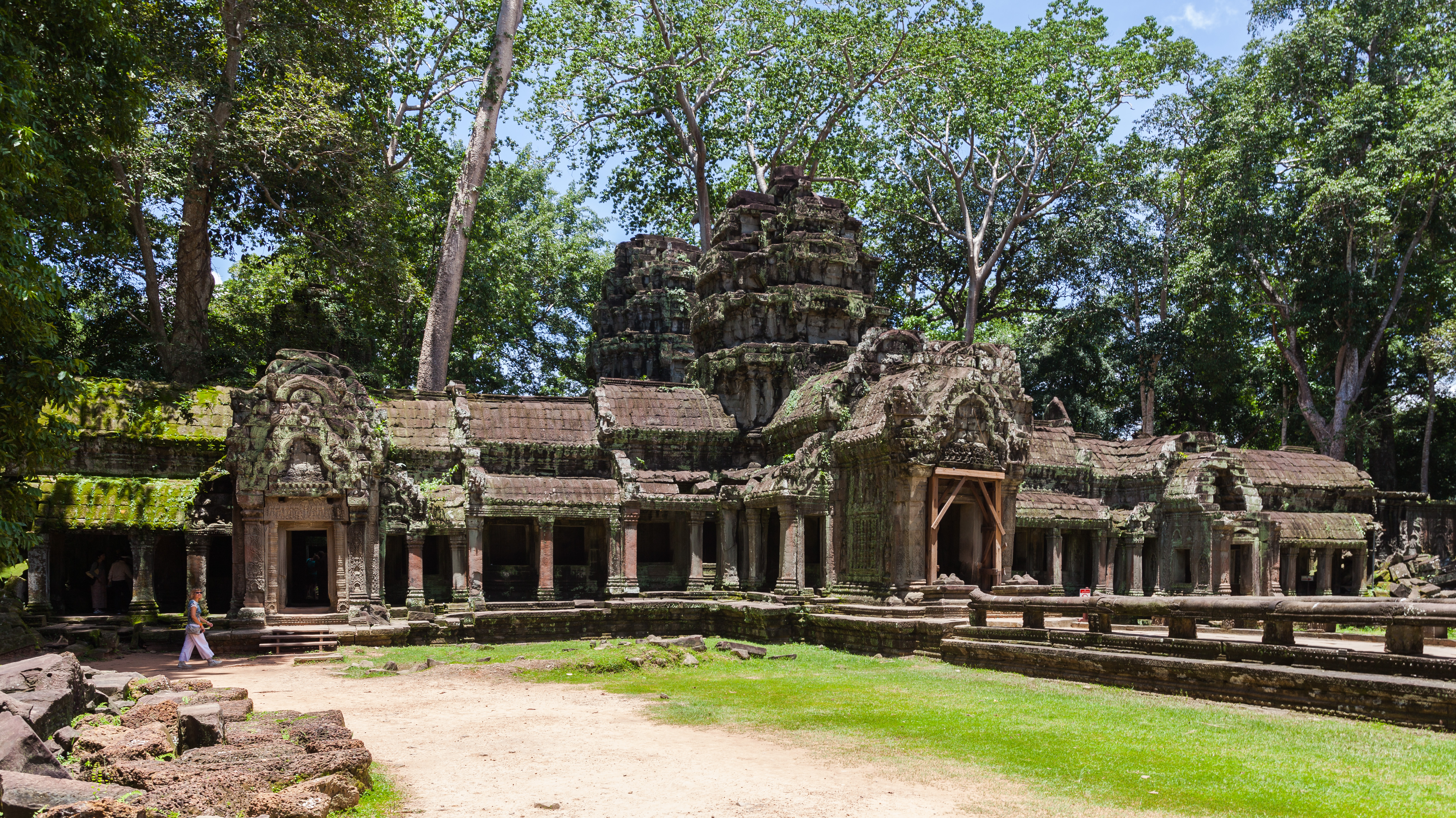

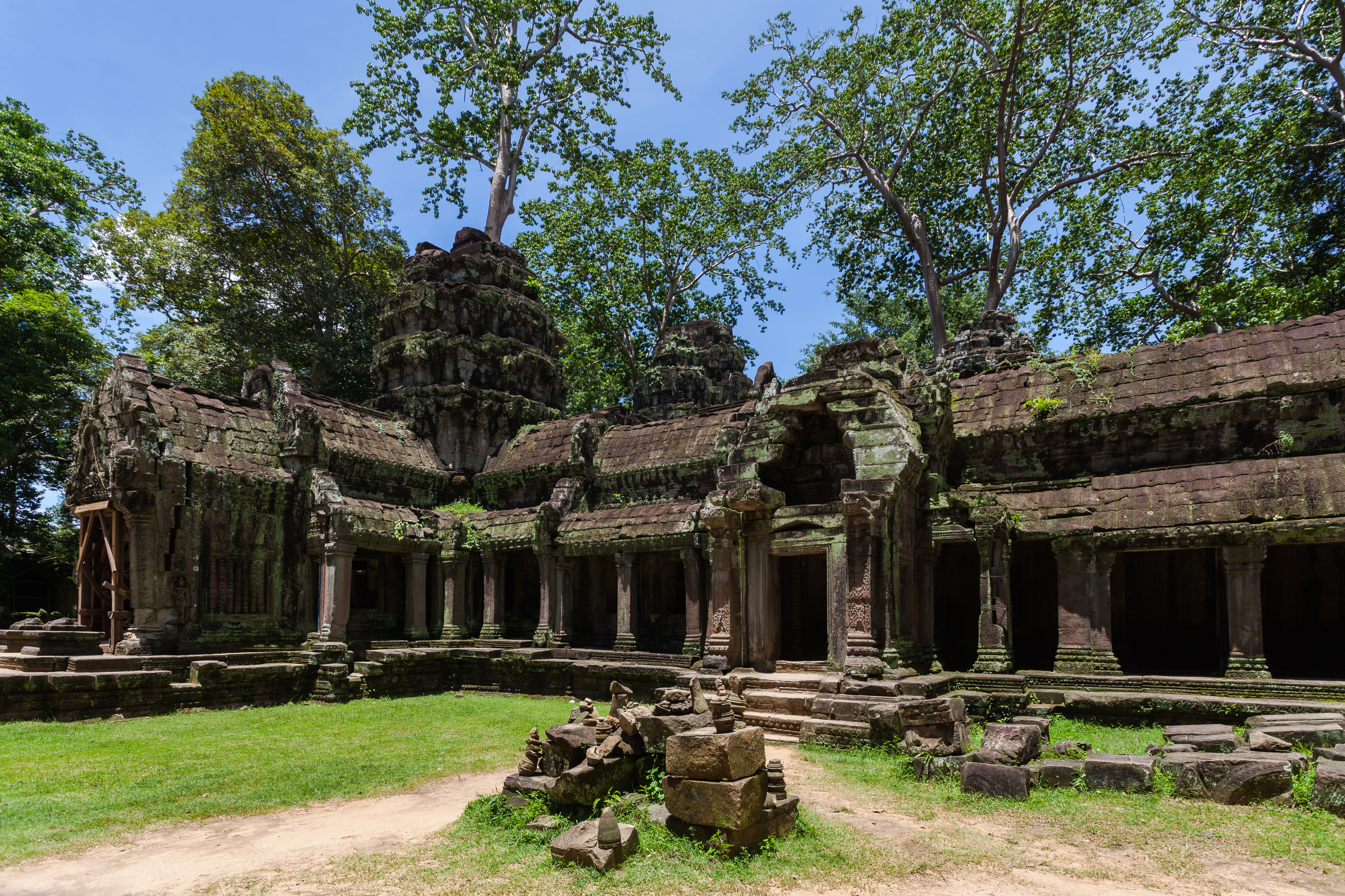

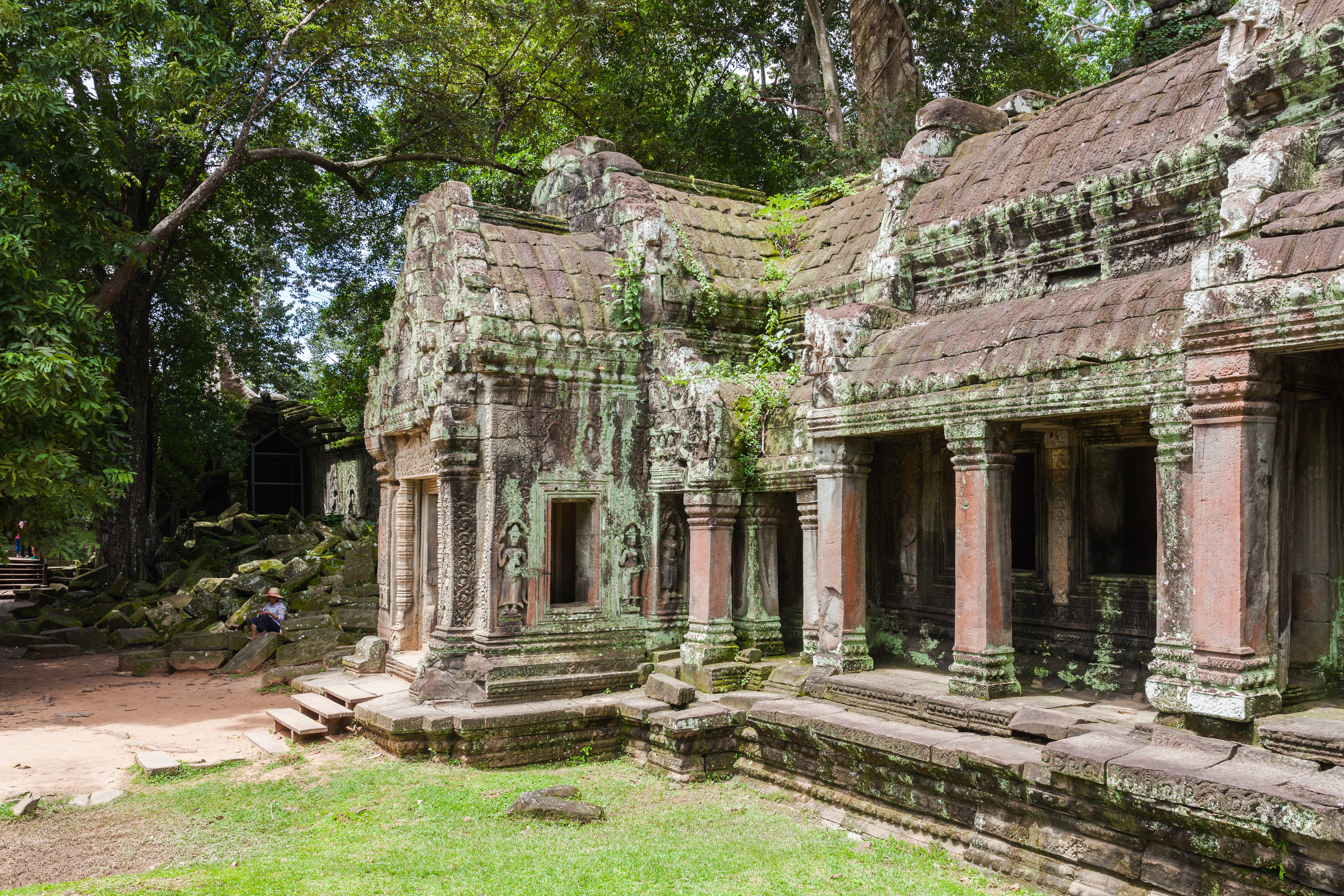

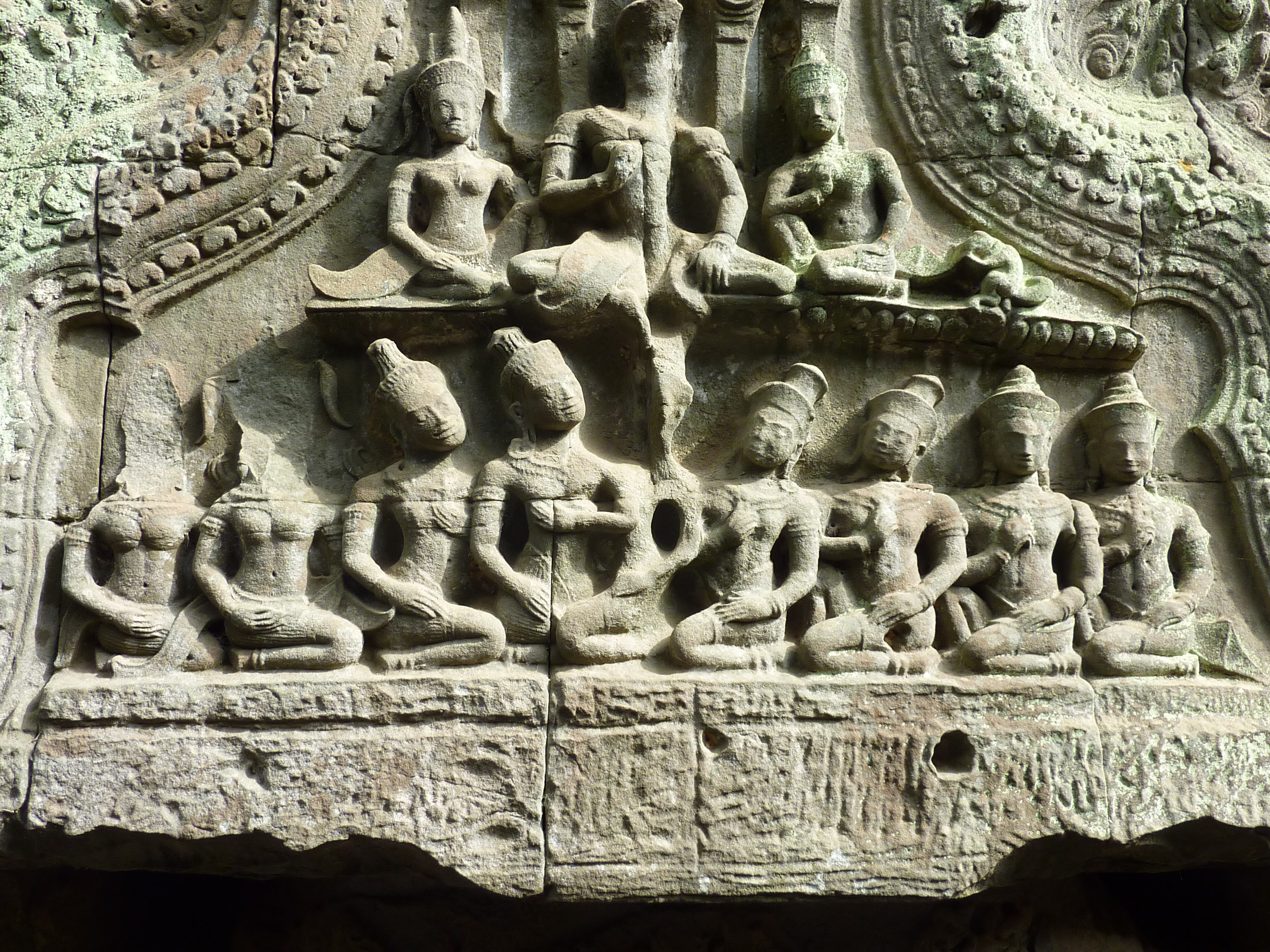

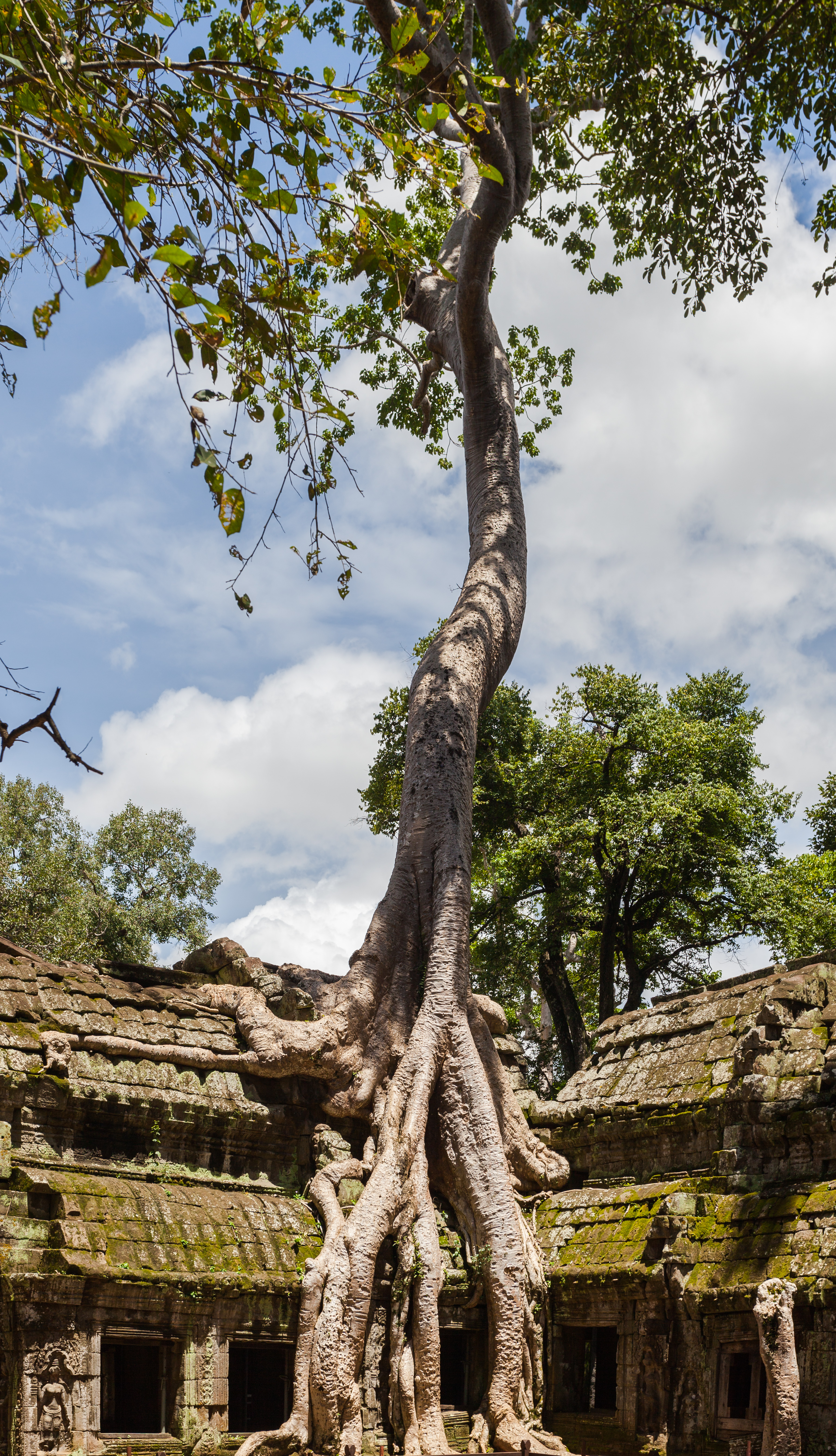

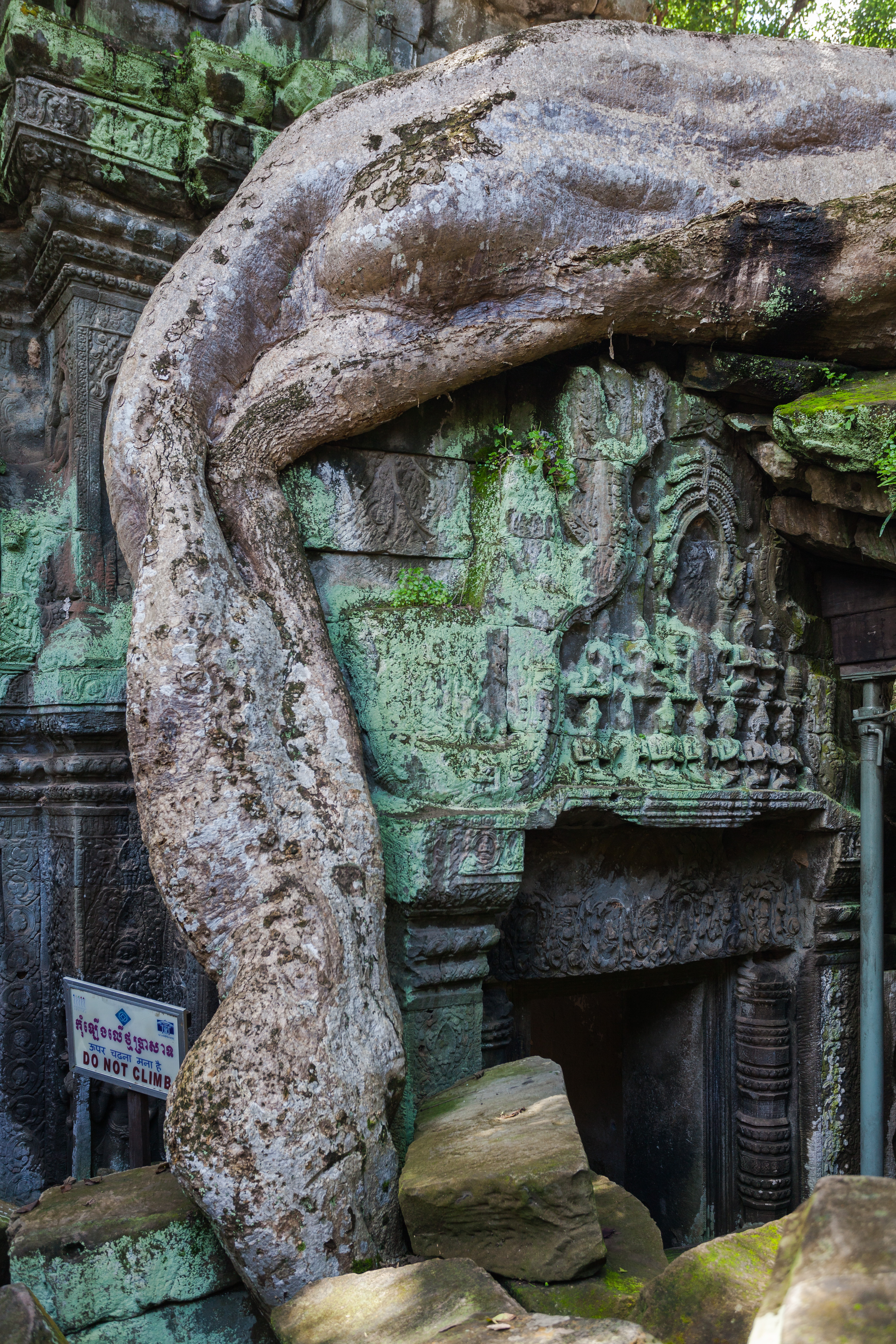

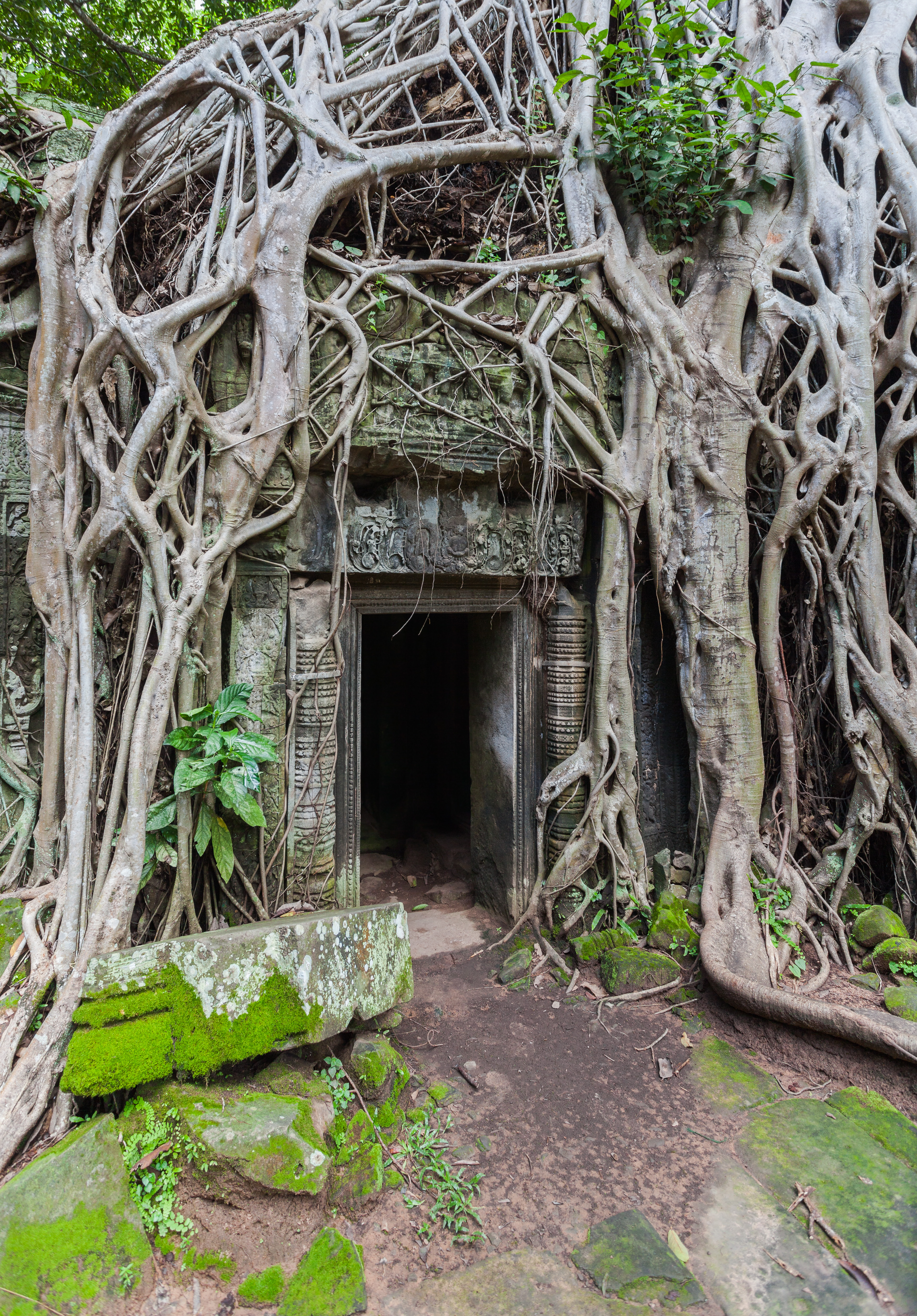

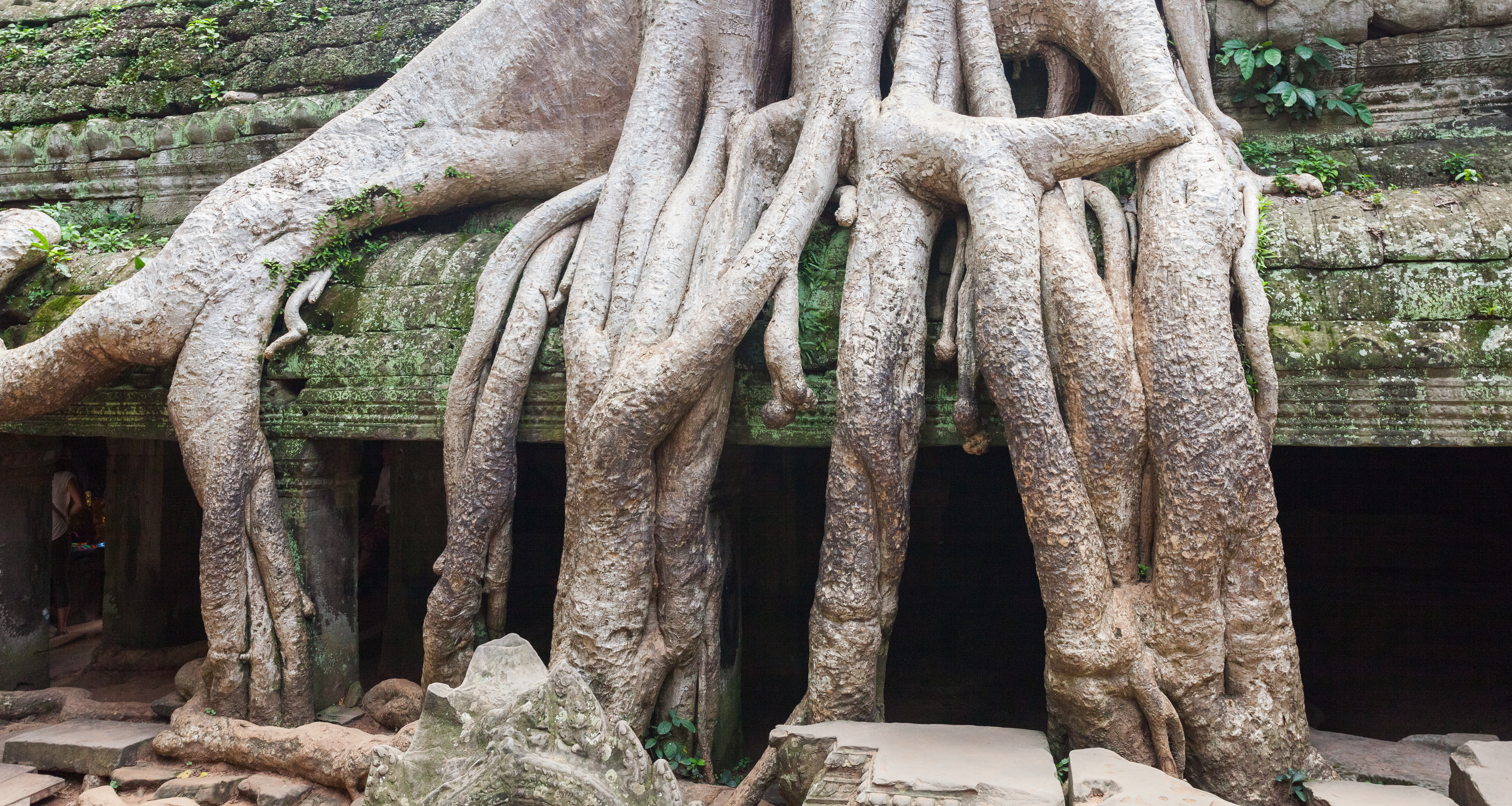

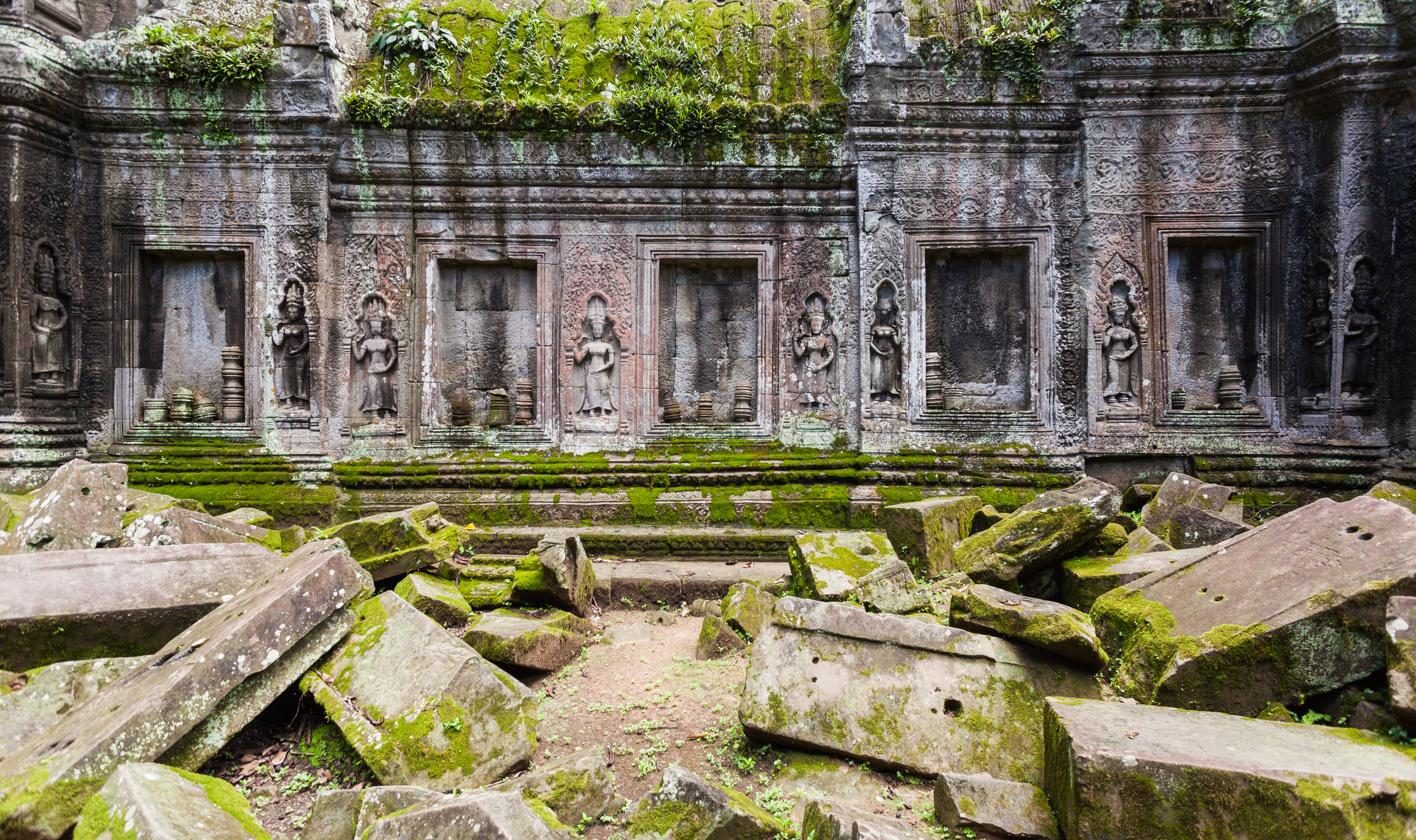

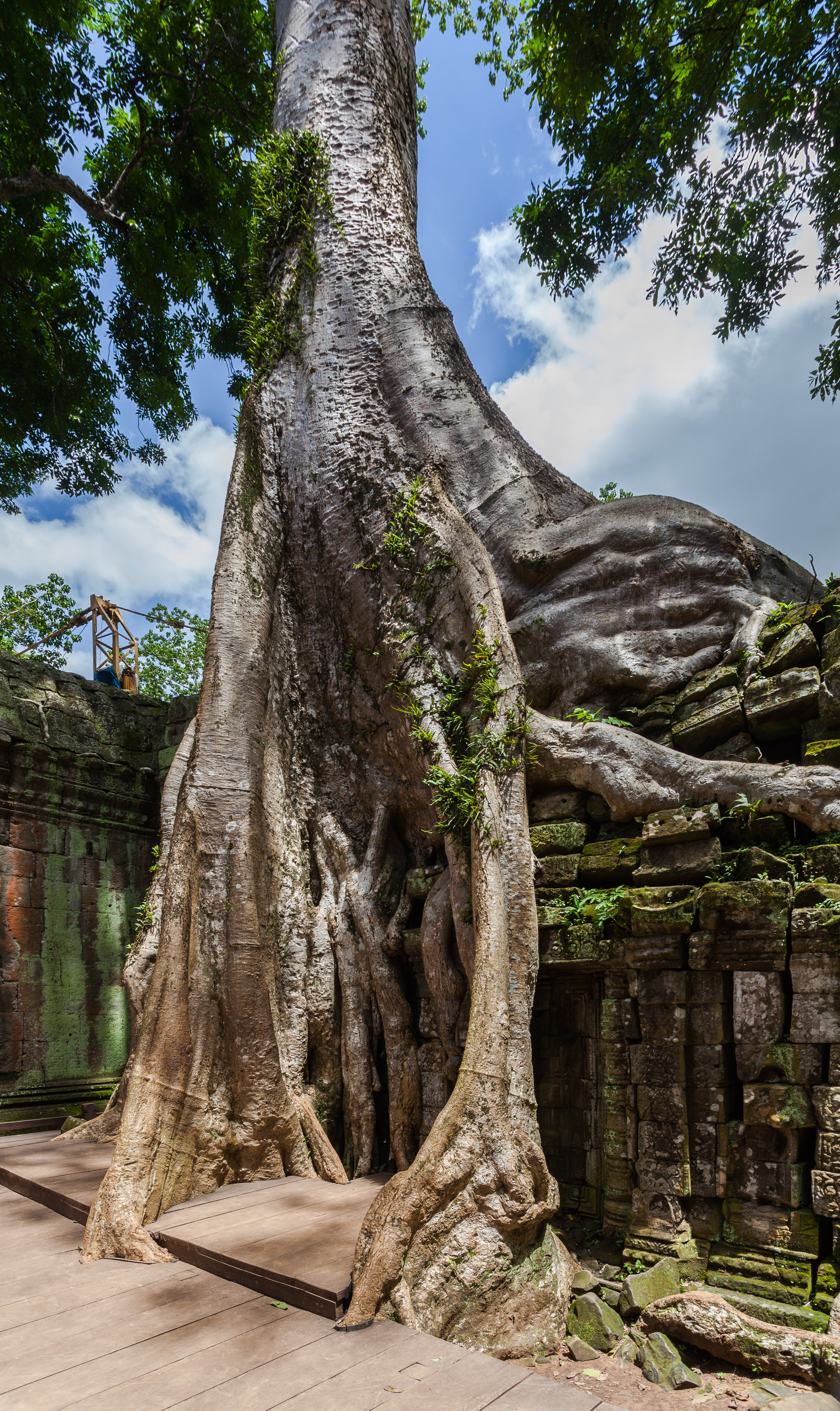

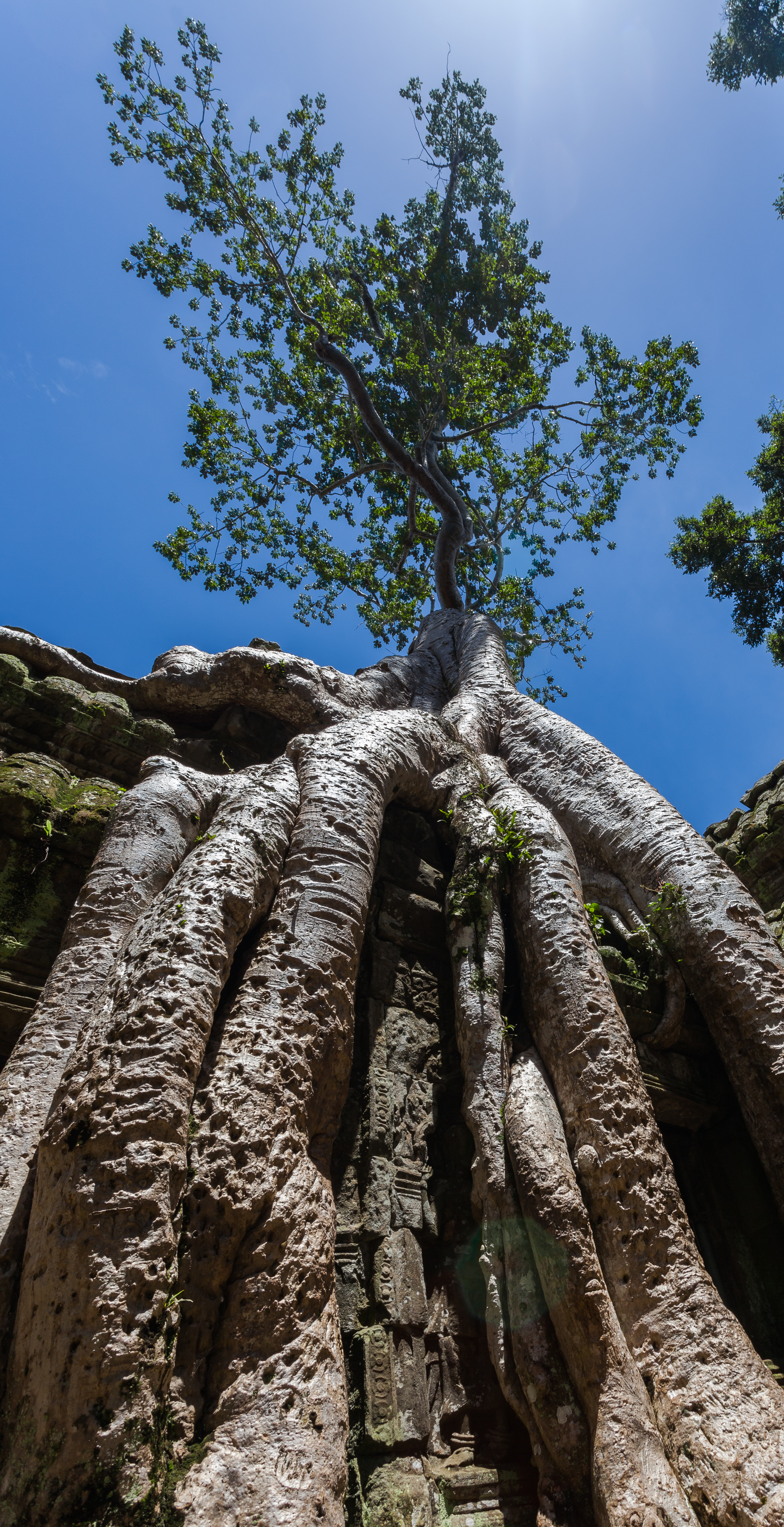

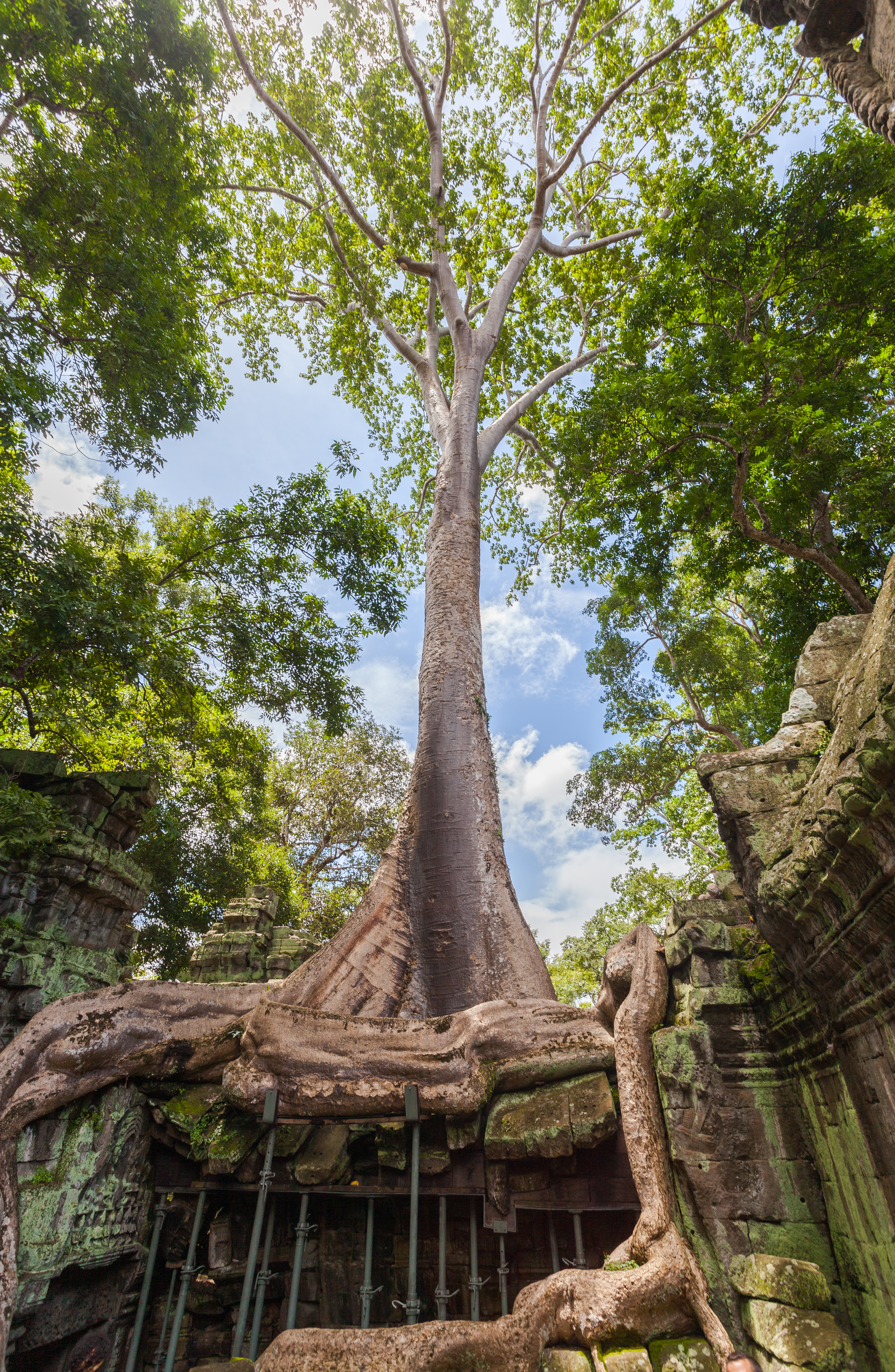
