= Beauchamp (surname) =

People with the surname Beauchamp include:

== Academia ==
- Alphonse de Beauchamp (1767–1832), French historian
- Mary Elizabeth Beauchamp (1825–1903), British-American educator and author
- Paul Marais de Beauchamp (1883–1977), French zoologist
- Pierre-François Godard de Beauchamps (1689–1761), French playwright, theater historian and libertine novelist
- Tom Beauchamp (1939–2025), American philosopher and bioethicist
- William Martin Beauchamp (1830–1925), American ethnologist and clergyman

== Aristocracy ==
- Anne Beauchamp, 15th Countess of Warwick (d. 1449)
- Lady Evelyn Beauchamp (1901–1980), one of the first people in modern times to enter the tomb of Tutankhamun
- Guy de Beauchamp, 10th Earl of Warwick (d. 1315)
- Henry Beauchamp, 1st Duke of Warwick (1425–1445)
- John Beauchamp, 1st Baron Beauchamp of Warwick
- John Beauchamp, 1st Baron Beauchamp of Somerset
- John Beauchamp, 2nd Baron Beauchamp of Somerset
- John Beauchamp, 3rd Baron Beauchamp of Somerset
- John Beauchamp, 1st Baron Beauchamp (fifth creation)
- Richard Beauchamp, 13th Earl of Warwick (1382–1439)
- Richard Beauchamp, 2nd Baron Beauchamp (1435–1502/3)
- Thomas Beauchamp, 11th Earl of Warwick (d. 1369)
- Thomas Beauchamp, 12th Earl of Warwick (c. 1339–1401)
- William de Beauchamp (of Elmley), (c.1105–c.1170), Anglo-Norman baron and sheriff
- William de Beauchamp, 9th Earl of Warwick (1237–1298), English nobleman and soldier
- William Beauchamp, 1st Baron Bergavenny (c.1343–1411), English peer
- William (III) de Beauchamp, Anglo-Norman baron and sheriff

== Arts ==
- Antony Beauchamp (1918–1957), British photographer
- Beauchamp, stage name sometimes used by French actor Edmond Beauchamp
- Bianca Beauchamp (born 1977), Canadian fetish model
- D. D. Beauchamp (1908–1969), American screenwriter
- Fleurette Beauchamp-Huppé (1907–2007), Canadian pianist, soprano and teacher
- George Beauchamp (1899–1941), American inventor of musical instruments and co-founder of Rickenbacker
- Josh Beauchamp, dancer, singer and member of international pop group Now United
- Kathleen Mansfield Beauchamp, birth name of writer Katherine Mansfield (1888–1923)
- Mary Elizabeth Beauchamp (1825–1903), British-American educator and author
- Pierre Beauchamp (1631–1705), French baroque choreographer, dancer and composer
- Pierre-François Godard de Beauchamps (1689–1761), French playwright, theater historian and libertine novelist
- Reginald E. Beauchamp, American sculptor (1910–2000)

== Business ==
- Christine Beauchamp, American businesswoman
- Frank Beauchamp, owner of coalmines in the Somerset coalfield
- George Beauchamp (1899–1941), American inventor of musical instruments and co-founder of Rickenbacker
- John Beauchamp (Plymouth Company), influential member of the Plymouth Company

== Government and politics ==
- Sir Brograve Beauchamp, Conservative Member of Parliament for Walthamstow East from 1931 to 1945
- David J. Beauchamp (born 1940), American politician
- Sir Edward Beauchamp (1849–1925), Liberal Party Member of Parliament for Lowestoft from 1906 to 1922
- Frances Estill Beauchamp (1860–1923), American temperance activist, social reformer, and lecturer
- Joan Beauchamp, prominent suffragette and co-founder of the Communist Party of Great Britain
- Kay Beauchamp (1899–1992), leading member of Communist Party of Great Britain and co-founder of the Daily Worker, later the Morning Star newspaper
- Line Beauchamp (born 1963), Canadian politician, Quebec provincial cabinet minister
- William de Beauchamp (of Elmley), (c.1105–c.1170), Anglo-Norman baron and sheriff
- William de Beauchamp (1185) (c.1185–1260), English judge and High Sheriff
- William (III) de Beauchamp, Anglo-Norman baron and sheriff

== Sports ==
- Jim Beauchamp (1939–2007), American major league baseball player and major league baseball coach
- Joe Beauchamp (1944–2020), American football player
- MarJon Beauchamp (born 2000), American basketball player
- Michael Beauchamp (born 1981), Australian international soccer player, defender

== Other fields ==
- Andrew Beauchamp-Proctor (1894–1921), South African airman
- Christine Beauchamp (pseudonym), case study patient
- Lady Evelyn Beauchamp (1901–1980), one of the first people in modern times to enter the tomb of Tutankhamun
- George Beauchamp (sailor), Titanic survivor
- Jereboam O. Beauchamp (1802–1826), American lawyer and murderer
- Noah Beauchamp (1785–1842), American blacksmith and murderer
- Scott Thomas Beauchamp, American soldier; see Scott Thomas Beauchamp controversy
- Walter de Beauchamp (disambiguation), multiple people
- William Martin Beauchamp (1830–1925), American ethnologist and clergyman
- William de Beauchamp, 9th Earl of Warwick (1237–1298), English nobleman and soldier
