= Nampa figurine =

1889 American archaeological hoax

Nampa Figurine
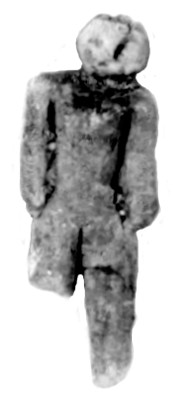
- The Nampa Figurine (above) Front, back, and side profiles (Below)

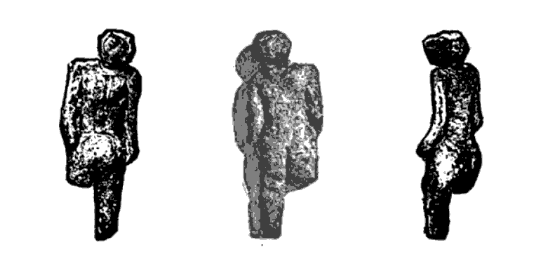
- Type: Clay figurine
- Material: Quartz, Fired clay
- Size: 1 1/2 inches (38 mm)
- Created: Debated, likely late 1800s
- Discovered: July 1889; Nampa, Idaho, United States
- Discovered by: Mark Kurtz
- Present location: Idaho State Historical Society Museum
- Culture: Pocatello Native American

The Nampa figurine (also known as the Nampa Image or the Nampa Doll) is a 1.5-inch (38 mm) fired clay doll found near Nampa, Idaho, in 1889. The figurine has been dyed red, possibly due to iron oxide deposition, and depicts a female figure with jewelry and clothing. The artifact has been the subject of substantial controversy over its apparent age. While scholarly consensus today holds that the doll is a hoax, initial estimates of the artifact placed its age at 2 million years old, significantly outdating any other clay artifacts and humanity's arrival in the Americas.

While archeologists have debated whether the figurine was a hoax or not, the consensus is that the artifact is not 2 million years old. Archeologists George Frederick Wright, William Henry Holmes, and Keith Fitzpatrick-Matthews have argued that the object descended rapidly due to a geological phenomenon or was displaced by the drilling mechanism that originally uncovered the figurine. Wright, whilst being a strong proponent of the object's validity, estimated the age in terms of thousands of years. Wright's support of the Nampa figurine's genuineness has been heavily criticized as being religiously motivated. Daniel Garrison Brinton and John W. Powell argued the artifact was a 19th-century doll made by the Pocatello, with modern-day archeologists holding the belief the artifact was a hoax. Members of the Pocatello Native American tribe have also affirmed the figurine was a hoax. Due to the controversy surrounding the artifact's age, many conspiracy theories have arisen around the artifact's origin.

== Description ==
The Nampa figurine is a small female figure made out of fired clay. The object is 1.5 inches (38 mm) in size and contains pieces of clay, quartz, and traces of iron oxide. The figure was found to be well worn with faint markings that may have represented clothing or jewelry around the chest and neck. The right leg of the figure was broken off.

Later, a reproduction of the figurine was created by geologist Albert Allen Wright and chemist Frank Fanning Jewett, who concluded that the piece could not have been made by a novice craftsman. The scientists noted that the red coloration of the doll was possibly due to iron oxide deposition, and not the doll's original color. Both Wright and Jewett were able to replicate the color through the use of acid staining. The figurine has often been compared to the Venus of Tan-Tan.

== History ==
The figurine was found in Nampa, Idaho in July 1889 by Mark A. Kurtz (1841–1906), a local businessman. Kurtz and his business partners were drilling for water, hitting a depth of 320 feet (98 m) while lining the bore hole as they went. Once the drill had penetrated through the basalt layer, approximately 60 feet (18 m) deep, the men transitioned to a pump mechanism to remove the quicksand and ceased drilling. Following this, the drill pump brought the figure to the surface whilst removing the sand layer at 261 to 301 feet (80 to 92 m) deep.

Union Pacific Railroad president Charles Francis Adams Jr. alongside a team of archeologists were contacted to perform the initial dating of the artifact. He wrote a memo saying it had been discovered "about the first of August".

On September 8, Adams wrote to Wright:

The day after the image was thrown up by the borer, Mr. Cumming, the general manager of the Union Pacific lines in that district, chanced to be in Boisé City, and saw it. Mr. Cumming is a graduate of Harvard College, and a thoroughly trained man. His evidence I should take as conclusive in regard to the facts.

On November 6, Adams wrote from Boston to Professor Henry W. Haynes to endorse the character of George Miller Cumming. Adams had apparently forgotten that Cumming had been in Boise the next day and had not been "on the spot the day the 'find' was made":

I should regard his evidence in this matter as entitled to as much consideration as the evidence of any scientific man would be. He was on the spot the day the 'find' was made, and his estimate of it would in my mind carry very great weight. He is, as you are aware, not only a graduate of the college, but he was educated as a lawyer, passed several years of study in Europe, and is a man of the highest personal character, accustomed to weigh evidence, and not likely to be deceived.

On December 2, Cumming wrote from Green River, Wyoming to Wright, in turn endorsing the characters of Mark Kurtz and Alexander Duffes (Duffes having co-founded the town of Nampa three years earlier):

As I was not present when the image is said to have been discovered, my own evidence is of no value whatever except as to the character and intelligence of Messrs. Kurtz and Duffes. I have known these gentlemen for some time and in the case of Mr. Kurtz for several years. … In the case of the Nampa image, they would have no motive to mislead the public … Messrs. Kurtz and Duffes exhibited the image to me at Nampa on the day after its alleged discovery … I am prepared to accept the image as what it purports to be, namely, as having been found at a depth of more than three hundred feet beneath the lava beds of the Snake River valley.

Due to this find, in 1929, a formal archeological survey of the site was performed by Louis Schellbach with support from the Museum of the American Indian and the Heye Foundation. The figurine is now housed in the Idaho State Historical Society Museum.

== Artifact dating ==
Early dating efforts used the law of superposition to date the figurine. The figure was found at a clay and sand layer in the Glenns Ferry Formation dating to the Pliocene-Pleistocene transition. The sand layer was covered by a lava flow that was estimated to be deposited during the Late Tertiary or early Quaternary period, placing the figurine at an age of 2 million years old, during the early Pleistocene age. In 1904, a U.S. Geological Survey atlas was published, affirming that the well had been dug "below the 60 feet of Quaternary material, 15 feet of basalt and 220 feet of sands with some clays". The atlas would affirm that the layers dug represented the Quaternary and Tertiary epochs. Samuel Franklin Emmons, in his assessment of the rock layers, would conclude that there was no indication that the rock layer was from the Tertiary period. Archeologist William Henry Holmes, an expert in out-of-place artifacts, stated:

While it may have been brought up as reported, there remains the possibility that it was not an original inclusion under the lava. It is not impossible that an object of this character could have descended from the surface through some crevice or water course penetrating the lava beds and have been carried through deposits of creeping quicksand aided by underground waters to the spot tapped by the drill.

George Frederick Wright, in 1911 and 1912, surveyed the site, ruling that the artifact's layer may be thousands of years old. Wright theorized that the rupture of Lake Bonneville and flooding Snake River Valley resulted in the region being buried in a sediment and quicksand. Soon after, volcanic eruptions formed the basalt layer, with Wright noting that the Nampa area was on the edge of the lava flow. Wright noted a similar phenomenon had occurred during the uplift of the Sierra Nevada Mountains during the beginning of the Glacial Epoch. Wright strongly contested that the artifact originated below the 60 ft deep basalt layer due to Kurtz lining the bore hole as he drilled, transitioning to a drill pump once the basalt layer had been breached. Wright's claim that the object was genuine and his flood theory have both been widely criticized by his contemporaries as pseudoarchaeology and an attempt to propagate Christian fundamentalism and creationism.

In 2011, archeologist and museum curator, Keith Fitzpatrick-Matthews would argue that the iron oxide responsible for staining the doll was found above the basalt layer (approximately 60 feet (18 m) feet down) and that clay balls were found close to the bedrock layer. These clay balls showed similar iron oxide staining as the figurine. Fitzpatrick-Matthews posited that this was evidence of a rapid descent of artifacts in the soil, or that the drill had pushed these objects deeper prior to their unearthing. The figurine is considered similar to the designs of other Upper Palaeolithic European artifacts.

== Controversy over validity ==
It has been widely proposed that the figurine may have been a fake, or an attempt at a hoax. At the time of discovery, the oldest fire clay artifacts dated to 6,000 to 10,000 years old, and the oldest simple human depiction, the Venus of Tan-Tan, was only about 300,000 to 500,000 years old.

Additionally, the first humans were estimated to have come to the Americas with recent findings dating between 25,000 and 27,000 years ago.

Previously, the first humans were estimated to have come to the Americas only 13,000 to 13,500 years ago. Between October and November 1889, Mark Kurtz and George Frederick Wright engaged in a series of letters detailing the limitations and mechanics of the drill pump. Wright concluded that had the object been intentionally dropped down the shaft, the pump actions would have destroyed the fragile artifact. Wright became a major proponent behind the idea that the discovery was a genuine archeological find, albeit, not 2 million years old.

Fredrick Ward Putnam and John Henry Haynes both claimed the artifact was not a hoax, with Haynes referring to it as "most important evidence of the great antiquity of man in America". The figure was presented to Fredrick Ward Putnam, who stated:

"…once directed attention to the character of the incrustations of iron upon the surface as indicative of a relic of considerable antiquity. There were patches of anhydrous red oxide of iron in protected places upon it, such as could not have been formed upon any fraudulent object."

John W. Powell, a geologist sent to review the artifact, considered the figurine a hoax and criticized the circumstances under which it was found. Powell stated the toy was nearly identical to those made by local Native American tribes, and claimed that the drill would have broken the artifact should it have been brought up that way. Additionally, Powell harshly criticized Wright's affirmations that the object was genuine. Members of the Pocatello were later shown the artifact, who affirmed it was their craftsmanship and indeed a hoax. In 1892, Daniel Garrison Brinton, in the American Antiquarian and Oriental Journal, claimed the figurine was a hoax, also stating that the toy was similar to that of contemporary dolls made by the Pocatello. William John McGee would claim that the Nampa figurine was a "transparent fraud" in a criticism of George Frederick Wright's endorsement of the artifact.

Keith Fitzpatrick-Matthews argued the piece could not be 2 million years old as no other artifacts had been found from that time period. Carl Feagans, an expert in pseudoarchaeology, has claimed the figurine is a hoax. Feagans argued that during the time at which the figurine was found, archeological hoaxes were commonplace. Feagans compared the figurine to the Cardiff Giant, another archeological hoax at the time, and affirmed that the Nampa figurine was a 19th-century Native American doll. Furthermore, Feagans cited Frank Fanning Jewett's replication as evidence that the artifact was not stained by iron oxide deposition but rather contained iron oxide during its original firing. Archeologist Michael Brass also claimed the figurine was a hoax and too fragile to survive the drilling process in his book The Antiquity of Man: Artifactual, Fossil and Gene Records Explored.

=== Conspiracy theories ===
Due to the controversial circumstances under which the artifact was found, the Nampa figurine has been used by creationists to support their claims. Other paranormal and occult theories have arisen that the artifact is evidence of a lost civilization or time travel.

In 2007, Michael Cremo wrote about the Nampa Figurine in the Forbidden Archaeology column of the Atlantis Rising magazine. Cremo falsely claimed the artifact was found in a core sample and not brought up by a drill pump. His explanation was there was a scientific conspiracy to hide the artifact's age from the general public and used the figurine as proof of Old Earth creationism.

Charles Sellier and David W. Balsiger have claimed the artifact is evidence of the Genesis flood narrative in Christianity.

== See also ==
- Out-of-place artifact
- Pompey stone
