= William Martin Beauchamp =

American ethnologist and clergyman (1830–1925)

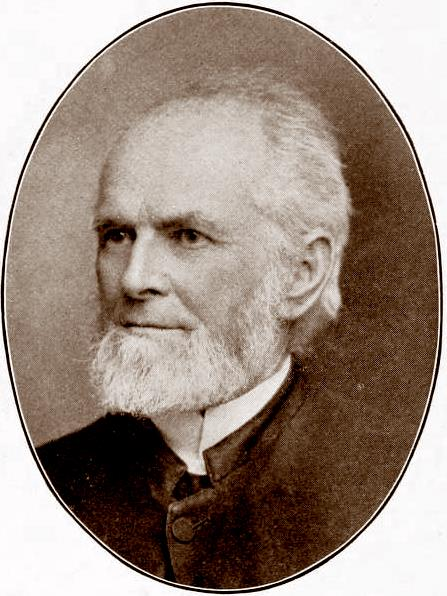
Beauchamp circa 1900

William Martin Beauchamp (March 25, 1830 – December 13, 1925) was an American ethnologist and Episcopal clergyman. He published several works on the archeology and ethnology of the Haudenosaunee (Iroquois) in New York.

== Early life and education ==
Beauchamp was born in Coldenham, Orange County, New York. He received his education at Skaneateles Academy until 1845. He graduated from the DeLancey Divinity School, and received a degree of Doctor of Sacred Theology (S.T.D. Sacrae Theologiae Doctor) in 1886 from Hobart College. He married Sarah Carter of Ravenna, Ohio in November 1857 and resided in Syracuse, New York. His sister, Mary Elizabeth Beauchamp, was an educator and author.

== Career ==
From 1865 to 1900, Beauchamp was rector of Grace Episcopal Church in Baldwinsville, New York. From 1884 to 1912 he was examining chaplain for the diocese of New York and from 1884-1910 he was archaeologist of New York State Museum. In 1894 Beauchamp was the first to seriously question the authenticity of the Pompey stone and prove that it was carved as a hoax.

In addition, he made valuable archæological contributions from his independent research, particularly concerning the Iroquois Indians. In 1889 the Bureau of American Ethnology commissioned him to survey the Iroquois territory in New York and Canada, and to prepare a map indicating the location of all the known Indian sites in that region. An enlargement of this map was published in Beauchamp's Aboriginal Occupation of New York (1900). His other works are:

- The Iroquois Trail (1892)
- Indian Names in New York (1893)
- Shells of Onondaga County (1896)
- History of the New York Iroquois, now Commonly Called the Six Nations (1905)
- Aboriginal Use of Wood in New York (1905)
- Aboriginal Place Names of New York (1907)
- Past and Present of Syracuse and Onondaga County (1908)
- Iroquois Folk Lore, Gathered From the Six Nations of New York (1922)
- William Martin Beauchamp Letter (1923)

=== Member of organizations ===
- American Folklore Society
- Onondaga Historical Association (1909-1910)
- A.A.A.S.
