= John Edson Sweet =

American mechanical engineer

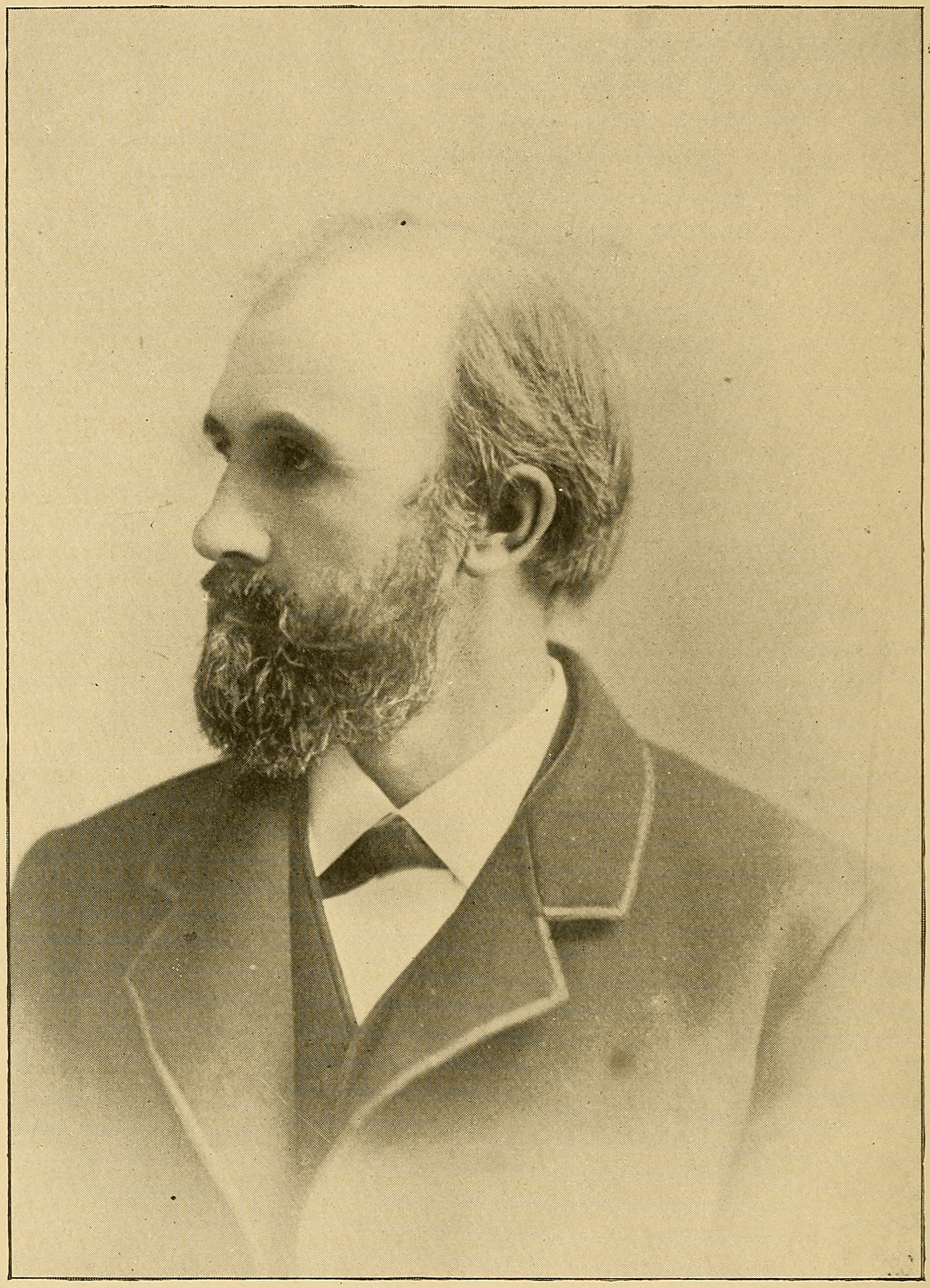
John E. Sweet pictured in Cassier's Magazine, April 1892.

John Edson Sweet (Pompey, New York, October 21, 1832 – Syracuse, New York, May 8, 1916) was an American mechanical engineer, inventor, professor, businessman and president of the American Society of Mechanical Engineers from 1884–1885. He is known for building the first micrometer caliper in 1873, for making tools, and for inventing the "straight line" engine.

== Biography ==
Born in Pompey, New York in 1832, Sweet got only some schooling at the district school. He started working young as a farm hand, became a carpenter's apprentice, and settled as architect and builder in the South.

At the outbreak of the American Civil War in 1861 he returned to the North. From 1862 to 1864 Sweet worked as mechanical draftsman in England, and upon his return to the States was engaged in bridge building and invented several things. At the Paris Exhibition of 1867 he introduced a linotype machine.

From 1873 to 1878 he was professor of practical mechanics at the Sibley College of Mechanic Arts of Cornell University, which he also headed. Afterwards he was founding president of straight line engine works. At the World's Columbian Exposition in 1893 he was expert for the government, and one of the jurors on machine tools.

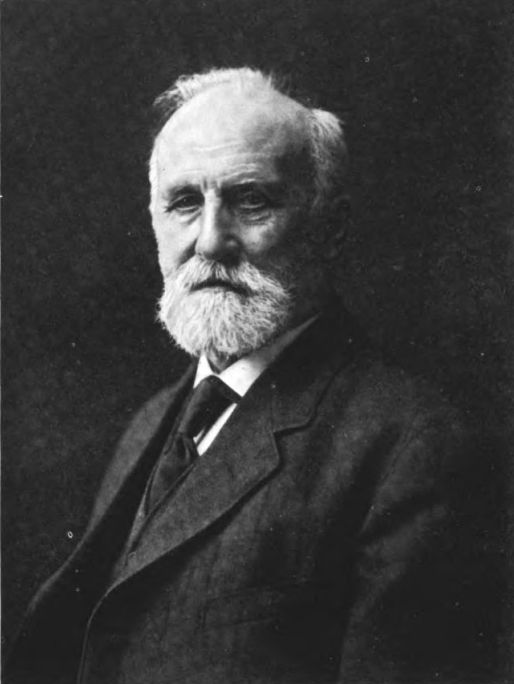
John Edson Sweet (1832–1916)

In 1880 Sweet was a key founder of the American Society of Mechanical Engineers (ASME), and its third president in the year 1884–1885. In 1914 the ASME awarded him the John Fritz Medal "for his achievements in machine design, and for his pioneer work in applying sound engineering principles to the construction and development of the high-speed steam engine." In 1914 he also received the honorary degree of Doctor of Engineering from Syracuse University. Sweet was elected an honorary member of the ASME in 1916.

In 1894, Sweet admitted that his relatives had carved the Pompey stone as a hoax.

== Publications ==
- Sweet, John E. (1906). Things that are usually wrong. New York: Hill Publishing Company. LCCN 06021207. OCLC 3700573.
- Sweet, John E. (1908). "The Industrial School". Report on the Committee on Education. Syracuse Chamber of Commerce. pp. 12–15. LCCN e09001178. OCLC 40000018.

Patents, a selection

- Patent US 121261, Improvement in the manufacture of guards for harvesting-machines, 1871
- Patent US 261967, tool post for lathe, 1881
- Patent US 532296, steam and water separator, 1884–85
- Patent US 624575, Steam-separator, 1896–98
- Patent US 682507, Changeable-speed gearing, 1899–1901
