= Pompey stone =

Stone carved as a hoax near Pompey, US

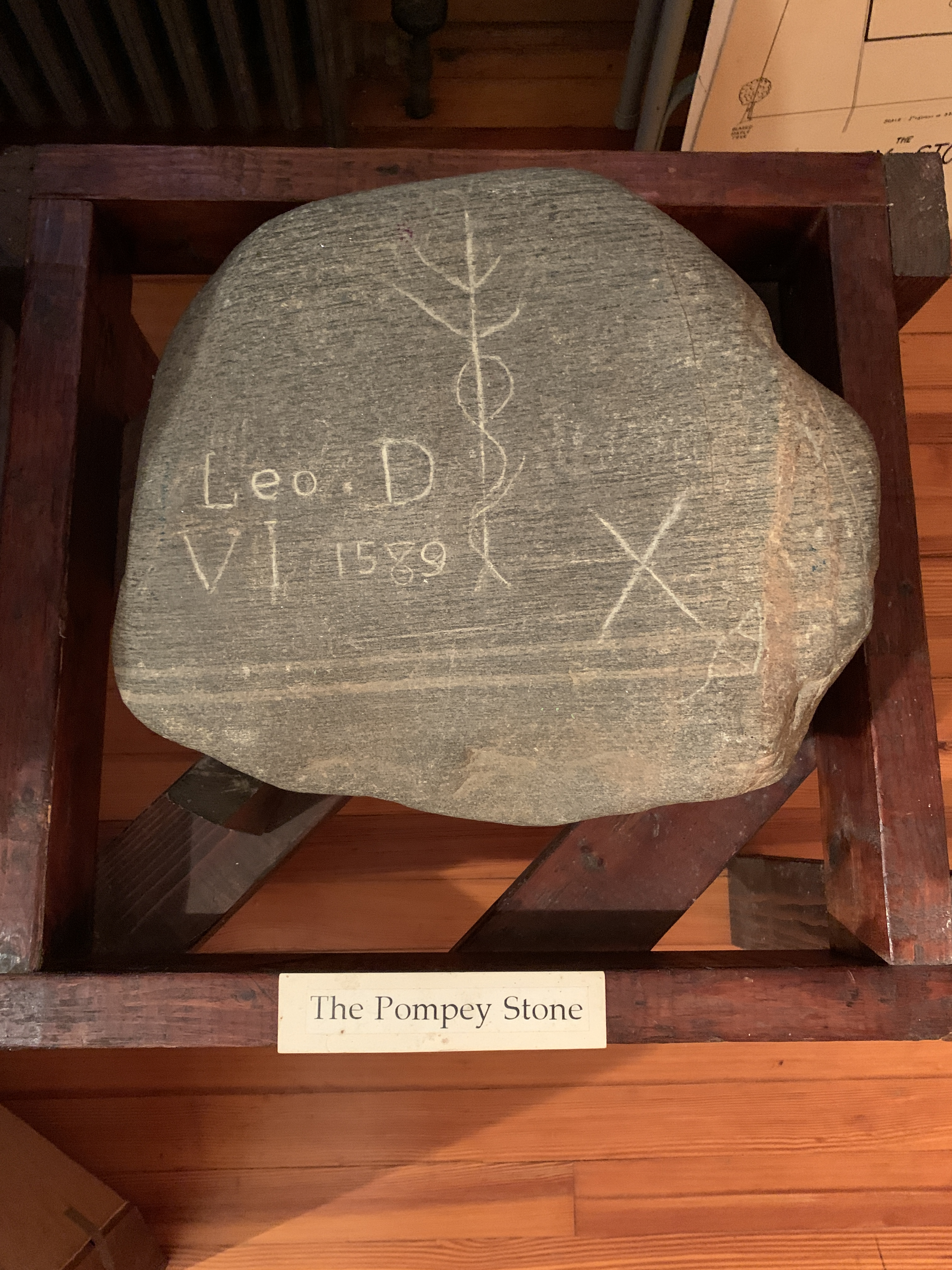
The Pompey stone in 2021

The Pompey stone was carved as a hoax near Pompey, New York, United States, circa 1820. Upon its discovery that year, the stone was quickly accepted as authentic, dated to circa 1520, and extensively analyzed by historians of the day for its significance as an early record of European presence in the region. It was commonly thought to have marked the grave of a Spaniard, who was proposed to have been an explorer, missionary, or captive of a Native American tribe.

The hoax was generally accepted as authentic for the next seventy years, and after being displayed for a year in Manlius it was moved to Albany, first in the State Museum of the Albany Institute and after 1872 in the New York State Museum of Natural History. In 1894, the antiquarian William M. Beauchamp conducted research casting doubt on the stone's age and suggesting it was a hoax. Later that year, the engineer John Edson Sweet publicly admitted that his relatives had carved the stone in the 19th century. The stone has since remained on display as an example of a hoax and as of 2018, was held by the Museum of the Pompey Historical Society.

== Design ==
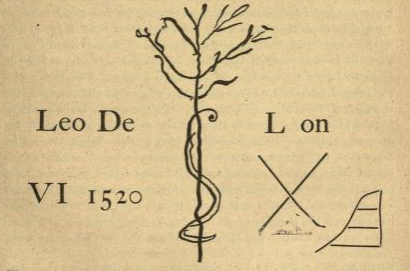
Depiction of the Pompey stone's inscription by Henry A. Homes. c. 1879

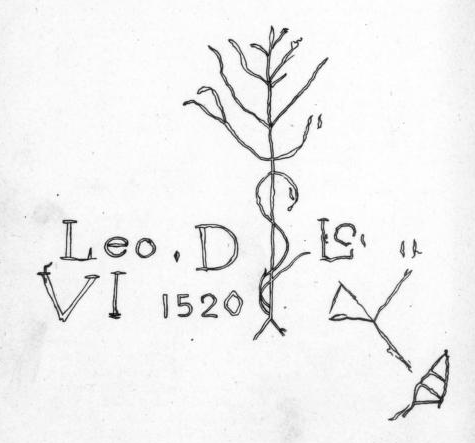
Depiction of the Pompey stone's engraving by William M. Beauchamp c. 1911

The stone is roughly an oval, approximately 14 inches (360 mm) long, 12 inches (300 mm) wide, and 10 inches (250 mm) thick, and composed of gneiss. It weighs around 127 pounds (58 kg). The center of the stone is inscribed with a tree that is being climbed by a serpent. The stone was initially engraved with "Leo De L on VI 1520", which was translated in 1841 by the historians John Warner Barber and Henry Howe as meaning "Leo X by the Grace of God; eighth year of his pontificate, 1520".

In 1937, Noah T. Clarke, (Note: Clarke had been appointed state archaeologist in 1925, and, despite not being a trained archaeologist, held the post until 1949.) the New York state archaeologist, noted that the stone's inscription had been changed, with the 1520 altered to read 1584, and the 'L on' disappeared. He attempted to restore other parts of the stone, but was limited in research as many records had been destroyed in the 1911 New York State Capitol fire.

== Early history and display ==
According to an 1894 letter published in the Syracuse Journal by John Edson Sweet, Sweet's uncle Cyrus Avery and Avery's nephew, William Willard, carved the stone and buried it in a field in Pompey "just to see what would come of it". The two decided not to come forward after it started to attract scholarly attention.

The stone was discovered by Philo Cleveland, a farmer living near Watervale, New York. In the summer of 1820 he began efforts to expand a patch of meadow on his farm. He was well into clearing the land, cutting down trees and removing stones, when he dug up the Pompey stone. Cleveland reportedly did not notice it and had stopped to take a break when he saw the inscription. He did not pay it much attention until several days later, at which point rain had cleaned the stone.

Intrigued by the stone, Cleveland brought it to the local blacksmiths. The stone became a local attraction and visitors to the shop used nails and files to dig out the inscription; Huguenin attributes this to giving the stone "somewhat the appearance of a new work." After about six months in Watervale, it was moved to the nearby village of Manlius, and while there was visited by several scientists. The stone was then put on display in the State Museum of the Albany Institute, after about a year in Manlius. In 1872, the Albany Institute deposited the stone with the New York State Museum of Natural History, which the State Museum described in their Annual Report as being intended to provide "better facilities for the inspection" of the stone. By 1880 the stone was on display in the New York State Museum of Natural History.

== Analysis ==
The stone began receiving published analysis as early as 1823, when an article republished in The Literary Chronicle analyzed the stone's inscription; concluding that it could be a reference to Pope Leo X's reign, the drawing in the middle a tree and serpent representing the fall of man, the letters L. s. as standing for loco sigilli (the place of a seal), a cross emphasizing the stone's Christian connections, and inverted U as marking the location of a seal.

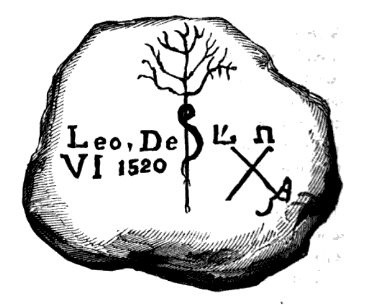
A drawing of the Pompey stone published in 1847 by Henry Schoolcraft

From the 1840s to 1870s the stone was analyzed by several American archaeologists, historians and researchers. In 1842, Barber and Howe theorized in their book Historical Collections of the State of New York, that the stone could mark the resting place of a Spaniard who died after traveling from Florida in search of riches. The anthropologist Henry Schoolcraft's 1847 book Notes on the Iroqouis attributed it to a party that had been separated from one of the explorer Juan Ponce de León's expeditions searching for the Fountain of Youth, considering the text 'De L on' to reference 'de Leon' and the 'VI' a reference to six years after de Leon's discovery of Florida in 1512. Joshua V. H. Clark in his 1849 Onondaga, or Reminiscences also concluded that the stone might mark the burial ground of a dead Spanish explorer. Two years later E. G. Squier, an American archaeologist, published the book Antiquities of the State of New York, which endorsed the stone's authenticity. The author and researcher Buckingham Smith, in 1863, submitted a paper to the American Antiquarian Society that suggested that the stone was a memorial to a dead Spanish missionary and the inscription a reference to Pope Leo X. In the 1860s, John F. Boynton, an early leader in the Latter Day Saint movement and scientist, proposed that there were connections between the stone and the Cardiff Giant, another artifact that was later proven to be a hoax.

In "the most elaborate defense" of the stone's authenticity, Henry A. Homes, librarian of the New York State Library, gave a lecture to the Oneida Historical Society on November 11, 1879, arguing that if it was not a hoax and was understood correctly, the stone held "the earliest evidence of the presence of the European in North America." He noted that the inscription's authenticity had never been questioned and that a Mr. Haven affiliated with the American Antiquarian Society deemed it well authenticated". Homes proceeded to analyze the commentary of his predecessors on the stone and concluded that none had reached a reasonable explanation. He concluded that the stone was a memorial to a European, likely Spanish and named Leo, who had been captured by a Native American tribe with several companions and adopted into the tribe. The stone was, he wrote, probably made by a companion upon his death in 1520. The historian Berthold Fernow cited Homes in Justin Winsor's Narrative and Critical History of America (1884).

=== Exposure as a hoax ===
The Reverend William Martin Beauchamp, the "shrewdest of all Onondaga antiquarians" and first to seriously question the stone's authenticity, described the Spanish burial theory in 1911 as a "baseless tradition" and noted that the ground was unsuited to a burial.

Beauchamp became skeptical of the stone's origins in 1894 upon hearing from a member of the Board of Regents of the University of the State of New York that its authenticity had almost never been questioned. He traced the inscription, analyzed it, and concluded that the inscription was made by tools including at least two different cold chisels, a hammer or mallet, and a punch. He also considered the 'L' and the numbers to have been written in a modern style, rather than how they would have been written in the 16th century. Finally, Beauchamp argued that no natives had lived near the site in the 16th century. Based on this, he deemed the stone likely to date from the 19th century and published an article in the Syracuse Journal outlining his thoughts. In response to the article, John Edson Sweet wrote, also in the Journal, that his uncle Cyrus Avery had confessed to Sweet in 1867 that he had created the hoax. Sweet concluded his letter by calling the stone "nothing more or less than a joke".

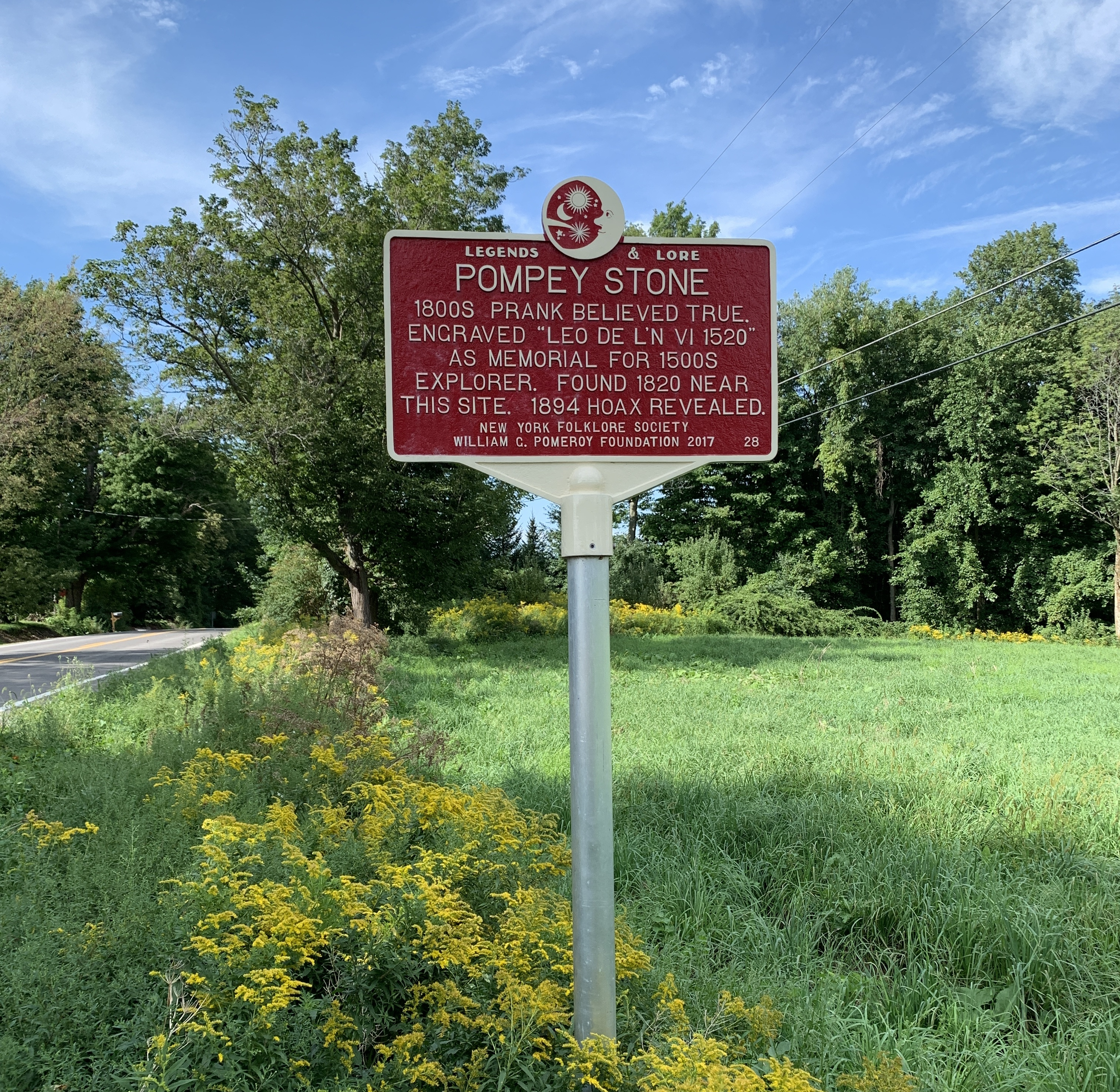
Historical marker at the location the stone was discovered

Even after this, at least two Catholic priests cited the stone as authentic evidence that Catholics had been in the United States as early as the 1520s. Also after Beauchamp's article, Woodbury Lowery briefly profiled the stone in his book The Spanish Settlements Within the Present Limits of the United States without questioning its authenticity, proposing that the stone could have been made by Spanish explorers on an unauthorized expedition seeking slaves.

== Later history ==
In 1939, the historian Arthur C. Parker wrote an article in American Antiquity titled "The Perversion of Archaeological Data" and noted the "discredited" Pompey stone as an example of "shoddy work [. . .] done by persons seeking fame or profit."

The stone was again exhibited in the New York State Museum in 1934, this time identified as a hoax. In 1953, Richard N. Wright, the president of the Onondaga Historical Association, wrote the museum's director Carl Guthe requesting that the stone be returned to Onondaga county, preferably permanently but at least temporarily. The state of New York continued to own the stone and loaned it to the town of Pompey in 1976 for their bicentennial celebrations. While it was there, Johanne D. Alexander, a member of the town's bicentennial committee, made a rubbing of the stone's inscription and was able to see the original work. In 2017, the William G. Pomeroy foundation and the New York State Folklore Society gave the Pompey Historical Society a grant to place a marker describing the hoax. As of 2018, the stone was held in the Museum of the Pompey Historical Society. Despite the hoax having been admitted, the museum's website still says "[t]here continue to be rigorous arguments on both sides" as to the stone's authenticity.
