= Pierre-François Godard de Beauchamps =

Pierre-François Godard de Beauchamps, born in 1689 in Paris, where he died on March 12, 1761, was a playwright, theater historian, libertine novelist and French translator. In his youth he was the secretary of François de Neufville, duc de Villeroi, who became governor of the child King Louis XV. His most famous works are Arlequin amoureux par enchantement (Harlequin in love by magic) and Les Amans réunis (The lovers of reunion).

Beauchamps worked for different theatres of the French capital. In 1721, he directed the performance of the play Soubrette, a comedy in one act, which was a success, and within ten years, he directed successively the plays: le Jaloux (the Jealous One); Arlequin amoureux par enchantement (Arlequin in love by spell); le Portrait (the Portrait); le Parvenu (the Upstart); le Mariage rompu (the Broken Marriage); les Effets du dépit (the Effects of Vexation); les Amants réunis (the Reunited Lovers); le Bracelet (the Bracelet); la Mère rivale (the rival Mother) and la Fausse Inconstance (the False Fickleness). Almost all were praised for their novelty at their time, but now have fallen into oblivion.

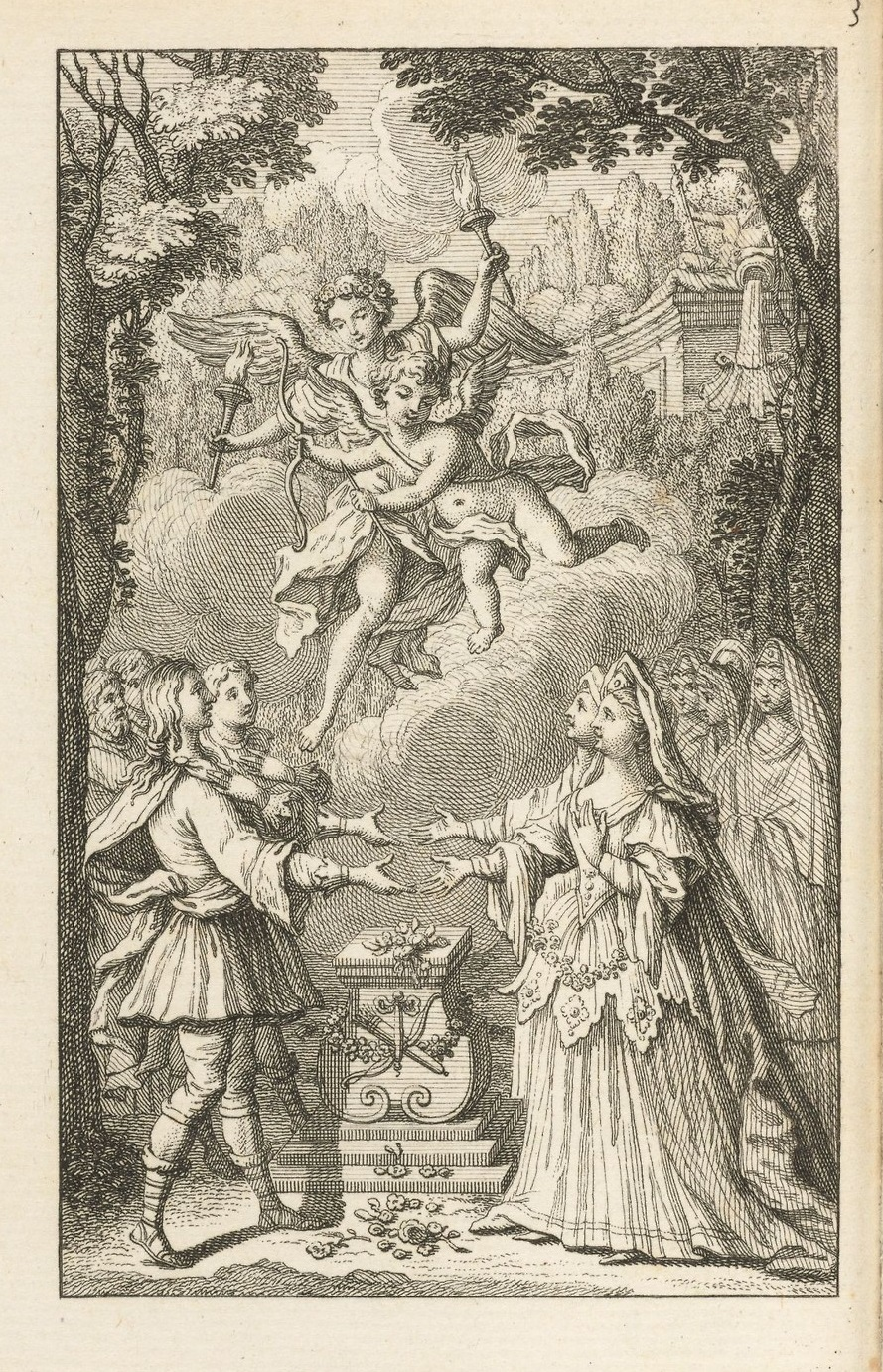
From a 1743 edition of Les Amours d’Ismene et d’Ismenias

From Beauchamps, we still can find: Funestime, a novel, Paris, 1737, in-12, rare and reprinted in the 31st volume of the Cabinet des Fées; the verse Lettres d’Héloïse et d’Abailard (first of three editions, Paris 1714); and les Amours d’Ismène et d’Isménias, an imitation from the Greek of Eustathius Macrembolites. The work of Beauchamps was printed in Paris, under the rubrique de la Haye, 1743, in-8°, and was reprinted, in the same town, in 1797, in-4°; the second edition is adorned with illumination drawings, Imitation du roman grec (les Amours de Rhodanthe et de Dosiclés) de Théodore Prodrome Pria, 1746, in-8°. This imitation differ from a translation which came out the same year, Paris, in-12, and which author have stayed unknown.

Finally, we credit Beauchamps with : a pamphleteer libertine novel, l’Histoire du prince Apprius (Priapus) extraite des fastes du monde, depuis sa création, manuscrit persan, trouvé dans la bibliothèque du roi de Perse, traduction française par M. Esprit, gentilhomme provençal, servant dans les troupes de Perse (the Story of prince Apprius, excerpt of the splendours of the world, since its creation, Persian manuscrit, found in the library of the king of the Persian Empire, French translation by Mr Esprit, country gentleman, serving in the Persian army), Constantinople (i.e. Paris, around 1722); la Haye, (i.e. Lyon), 1728, in-12. We find in some copies of this document an explanatory table giving the names of the indecent anagrams used by the author. The printer was sentenced to banishment and heavily fined; Hipparchia, histoire galante divisée en 3 livres, avec une préface très-intéressante (Hipparchia, galant history divided in 3 book, with a very-interesting preface), Lampsaque (i.e. Paris), l’an de ce monde (1748), petit in-8°.

His Recherches sur les théâtres de France, depuis 1161 jusqu’à présent (Researches on French theatres, from 1161 until present days), Paris, in-4°, or 3 vol. in-8 where he recounts the origin and the progress of drama in France, which he made published in 1735, constitutes his most important work. Paul Lacroix, a French journalist, wrote about it:

This book, still very useful in spite of similar works published since, consists of the history of the Provence poets, an essay on the origin of spectacles in France and on the establishment of theatres, a chronological analysis on the authors of mysteries, moralities, farces and guff before Jodelle, authors of French theatre in four ages until 1735, a repertoire of ancients ballets and major plays performed at the Théâtre Italien and at the Théâtre de la foire. Beauchamps, in his preface, doesn't name the people who give him material and notes; but, in his book, he cites some very important drama libraries, those of M. de Callières, the Count of Toulouse, and the one of Théodore Tronchin, etc.
