= Christine Beauchamp =

American businesswoman and fashion professional

Born: 1970

Education: Princeton University, Harvard Business School

Known for: Amazon

Christine Beauchamp (born c.1970) is an American businesswoman and fashion professional.

She has served as Senior Vice President of North American Stores at Amazon since 2021 and was recognized by

Fortune as a woman in business to watch in the years ahead.

== Education ==
Beauchamp graduated from Harvard Business School with an MBA and holds an undergraduate Politics degree from Princeton University.

== Career ==
After starting her career in 1992 as a financial analyst at Goldman Sachs, Beauchamp went on to lead brands including: Global Brand President, The Ralph Lauren Corporation; Brand President, Ann Taylor; and President and Chief Executive Officer, Victoria’s Secret Beauty.

Prior to Amazon, she was a co-founder of Protea, a private equity fund that invests in a curated portfolio of luxury lifestyle brands, served as a Board Member for a Carlyle private equity-backed European retail brand, and was an angel investor in several technology start-ups. Beauchamp also served as a Senior Advisor to The Boston Consulting Group in their Consumer, Retail, and Private Equity Practice Areas.

In May 2017, Beauchamp was announced as the new president of Amazon Fashion, replacing former president Catherine Lewis-Beaudoin. In December 2019, she was one of two women promoted to Amazon’s senior leadership team.

Christine Beauchamp was appointed Senior Vice President of North America Stores in 2021. In this role, she is responsible for Amazon's North America e-commerce business, encompassing hundreds of millions of products across more than 35 product categories, and oversees the selection, customer experience, and marketing of these Stores.

Beauchamp was formerly a member of the board of directors of Step Up Women's Network and a member of the executive committee of Angel Vine VC.
