= DeLancey Divinity School =

Educational institution

DeLancey Divinity School was a seminary of the Episcopal Church in the United States of America located in Geneva, New York, and Buffalo. It was founded in 1850 by William Heathcote DeLancey (1797-1865), first Bishop of the Episcopal Diocese of Western New York as a diocesan seminary at Geneva. The Rev. Dr. William Dexter Wilson (1816-1900) was its first warden, and it operated until 1858. On February 1, 1861, Bishop DeLancey opened a new diocesan school at Geneva under the direction of the Rev. James Rankine (1827-1896). In 1866, it was renamed the DeLancey Divinity School in memory of the founding bishop. DeLancey acquired the library of St. Andrew's Divinity School (Syracuse) in 1906. In 1920 it moved from Geneva to Buffalo. It was closed in 1935 by Bishop Cameron J. Davis.

The centenarian Episcopal priest John Robert Jackson (1913-2013) was believed to be the last living alumnus of DeLancey Divinity School. The former seminary grounds at 234 North Street in Buffalo are now a private residence.

== Notable alumni and people ==
- Ivan H. Ball
- William Martin Beauchamp
- G. Sherman Burroughs, warden 1918-1935
- Charles James Burton, alumni association chairman
- Norman B. Godfrey
- Levi W. Lunn
- Robert H. Moore
- G. Paul Musselman
- William Wirt Raymond
- Fayette Royce
- Frank L. Titus
- Joseph Wayne
