= George Beauchamp (sailor) =

British sailor, RMS Titanic survivor

George William Beauchamp
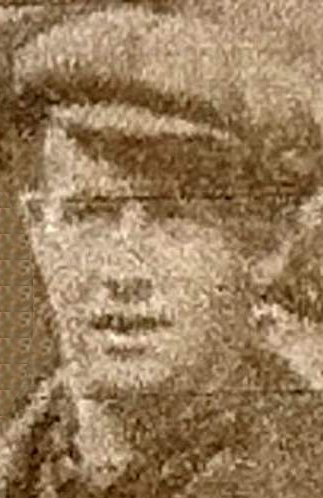
- George Beauchamp in 1912
- Born: 9 March 1888; Totton, England, UK
- Died: 5 April 1965 (aged 77); Southampton, England, UK
- Citizenship: United Kingdom
- Occupations: Sailor, fireman stoker

George William Beauchamp (9 March 1888 – 5 April 1965) was a British sailor who survived the sinking of the RMS Titanic where he worked as a stoker.

== Life ==
He was born in Totton, England, UK, in March 1888, the son of George Beauchamp and Maria Jane Walton. He had five siblings.

=== Titanic ===
On the Titanic he was paid £6 a month.

He later recalled that the water was up to his feet. Beauchamp ran topside and positioned on the starboard deck. Beauchamp's boat was later rescued by the Carpathia around 6.30 am.

He said at the British inquiry after the collision, the watertight doors and dampers began to block and that an order came to "stop" (it all). He testified that as a stoker, he was given the order to draw fires in the boilers (the fires that normally kept the ship's steam machinery running). After drawing the fires, he was relieved and escaped using a ladder. He later recalled helping ladies and children into the boats before receiving the order to board lifeboat #13. He said around 60 to 70 people were on board, including many men. He also said the boat had no lantern.

=== British inquiry ===
Beauchamp gave evidence at the British Wreck Commissioner's inquiry before counsel Raymond Asquith, where he responded to questions with blunt responses. Excerpts:

"I went ... on to the boat deck and across to the starboard side, I had one foot on the deck and one on the lifeboat and I was helping ladies and children into the lifeboat. We had difficulty keeping the lifeboat away from the ship's side and prevent[ing] water coming in."

"We pulled on the oars to get away as far as possible from the suction of the ship as it went down. I saw the ship go down bow first and I could still see the stern and then that went too. It was a roar like thunder as it went down and I heard cries as the ship sank."

"We would have gone back for others but we were full up."

=== Later life ===
George Beauchamp continued to work at sea into the 1920s and beyond. He later served on Cape Mail boats for the Union Line as a fireman.

Later in life, Beauchamp became a docker in Southampton.

He became friends with Bertram Vere Dean, who was the brother of the last Titanic survivor, Millvina Dean.

=== Death ===
Beauchamp died in April 1965, at the age of 77.
