= Walter de Beauchamp =

Walter de Beauchamp or Walter Beauchamp may refer to:

- Walter de Beauchamp (nobleman) (died c. 1130), of Elmley, hereditary Sheriff of Worcestershire 1114–1130
- Walter de Beauchamp (Steward to Edward I), (d.1306) of Beauchamp's Courty, Alcester
- Walter de Beauchamp (justice) (c. 1192–1236), of Elmley, hereditary Sheriff of Worcestershire 1215–1236
- Sir Walter Beauchamp (c. 1380–1430), MP for Wiltshire 1416 and Speaker of the House of Commons 1416
- Walter Beauchamp (cricketer) (1887–1976), South African cricketer
