= Henry A. Homes =

American diplomat

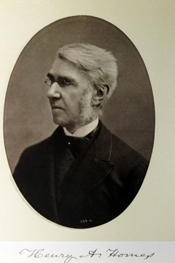
- Born: March 10, 1812; Boston
- Died: November 3, 1887 (aged 75)
- Alma mater: Phillips Academy; Amherst College; Andover Theological Seminary; Yale University
- Occupation: Librarian, diplomat, missionary
- Employer: New York State Library

Henry Augustus Homes (March 10, 1812 – November 3, 1887) was a librarian, diplomat, and missionary.

== Family background ==
His earliest New England ancestor was William Homes, a school teacher at Chilmark, Martha's Vineyard, from 1686 to 1692, and afterwards a Presbyterian clergyman. From this ancestor his line proceeded by Robert, William, William, to Henry, his father, who married Dorcas, daughter of Judge Samuel Freeman, of Portland, Maine.

== Education ==
He was fitted for college at Phillips Academy, Andover, and was graduated at Amherst College in 1830. He then pursued a theological course at Andover and Yale Seminaries.

== Career ==
Ordination

In 1835 he was ordained to the work of the ministry in the city of Paris, France, and from the years 1836 to 1850, held the position of a missionary of the American Board at Constantinople, Turkey. He was an interpreter there and Charge des Affairs of the United States, from 1851 to 1853.

Librarian

In 1854 he was chosen librarian of the New York State Library, at Albany, and came to be regarded as one of the foremost men in this department in this country.

Editing and missionary work

While connected with the mission work in Constantinople, he edited many volumes in the Turkish language with the Armenian character.

He was the editor of valuable books, and wrote many articles for the Bibliotheca Sacra and the American Biblical Repository.

== Personal life ==
He was married to Anna Heath, of Brookline, Massachusetts, and by her had one child, a son.
