= Mary Elizabeth Beauchamp =

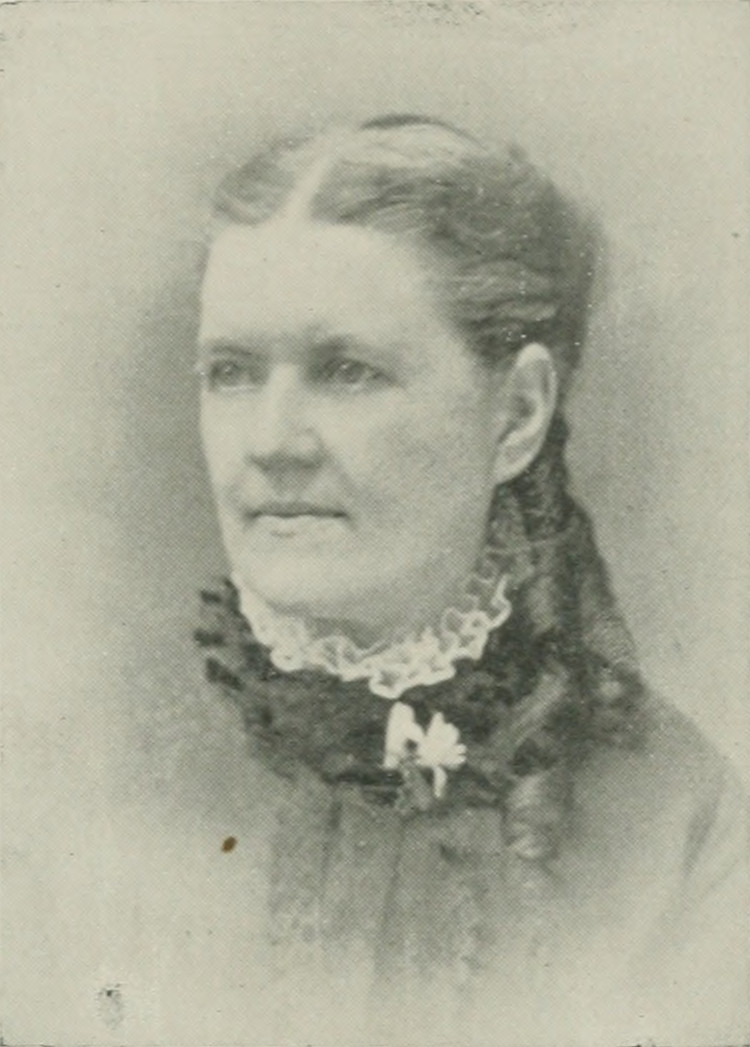
- Photo in A Woman of the Century
- Born: 14 June 1825; Burleigh, England
- Died: 1903 (aged 77–78)
- Occupations: educator, author
- Relatives: William Martin Beauchamp
- Writing career
- Pen name: Filia Ecclesia, M. E. Beauchamp
- Language: English
- Notable works: Handbook of Wells Cathedral; The Emigrant's Quest

Mary Elizabeth Beauchamp (pen names, Filia Ecclesia and M. E. Beauchamp; 14 June 1825 – 1903) was an English-born American educator and author. Beauchamp used various pen names, such as "Filia Ecclesia" and "M. E. Beauchamp". Her notable works include Handbook of Wells Cathedral (1856) and The Emigrant's Quest (1867). She wrote about the Haudenosaunee, and served as secretary for her younger brother, the ethnologist, William Martin Beauchamp.

== Early life and education ==
Mary Elizabeth Beauchamp was born in Butleigh in the English county of Somerset on 14 June 1825. The family removed to the United States in 1829, establishing themselves in Coldenham, Orange County, New York. In 1832, they removed to Skaneateles, New York, where Mr. Beauchamp went into the book business, to which seven years later he united a printing office and the publication of a weekly newspaper. In 1834, he established a circulating library of nearly a thousand volumes, which was very successful for many years. His daughter had free range of its carefully selected volumes and early acquired a familiarity with the best writers of the English language. The little girl wrote rhymes when she was ten years old, acrostics for her schoolmates and wildly romantic ballads. Before she entered her teenage years, she had become a regular contributor to a juvenile magazine, for which, at the age of fourteen, she furnished a serial running through half a volume.

== Career ==
From her teens, she wrote under various pen-names for several papers and achieved the honor of an illustrated tale in Peterson's Magazine before she was twenty. Then her literary career was checked by ill-health, and for ten years, she wrote little. What she published during that time appeared in religious papers under the pen-name "Filia Ecclesia," and some of these pieces found their way into contemporary collections of sacred poetry.

In 1853, accompanied by a younger brother, she visited England, where she remained nearly two years. At the desire of her uncle, a vicar in Wells, she prepared a Handbook of Wells Cathedral , which was published in different styles with illustrations. After returning home, she wrote a series of papers entitled "The Emigrant's Quest" which attracted attention for a year and were republished in a volume some years later. Beauchamp wrote letters, poems, and stories for the Baldwinsville Gazette, Churchman, Family (Troy, New York), Gospel Messenger, Journal, Living Church, and Skaneateles Democrat.

Her mother died in 1859, and the death of her father in 1867 broke up her home in Skaneateles. In the ensuing year, she took the position of teacher in the orphan ward of the Church Charity Foundation, in Buffalo, New York, remaining there twelve years. In 1879, she went to Europe for a year accompanied by a woman who had been associated with her in church work. Soon after returning to the U.S., Beauchamp learned that the Mission of the Protestant Episcopal Church to the Onondaga people was in temporary need of a teacher. She offered her services and was delighted with the work. She next purchased a residence in Skaneateles, where she conducted a school for the children of summer residents, organized a literary society for young ladies, and had adult pupils in French and drawing. She took her full share in parochial and missionary work and wrote for religious papers. In March, 1890, she was prostrated for some months by cerebral hemorrhage, and thereafter resided with a married sister in Skaneateles.

== The Emigrant's Quest; or, "Is it our own Church?" ==
The Emigrant's Quest; or, "Is it our own Church?" was published by "M. E. Beauchamp" (New York general Protestant episcopal Sunday-school union and church book society, 1867, 92 pages).

It was characterized as an "unpretending", tiny volume. The publisher, acknowledging that it did not have personal knowledge of the author, stated that Beauchamp could have rendered a much larger work. The story purports to be that of an English emigrant belonging to the Anglican Church, whom an avaricious landlord had forced to abandon the home of his ancestors and emigrate to the U.S.. The unfeeling conduct of the landlord; the grief of the family at having been dispossessed merely because the lease happened to expire; their parting with their friends, and so forth were each portrayed by "Mr. Beauchamp" with considerable pathos.

Having arrived in the U.S., the emigrant, his wife, and young daughter attend different Episcopal churches in New York. They compared what they saw and heard to what they had been used to in attending church in England. Some of the criticisms thus made were piquant; but in general, they were true. It thus afforded illustrations of the defects of two systems widely different from each other, but each highly characteristic of England.

== Selected works ==
- Handbook of Wells Cathedral (1856)
- The Emigrant's Quest; or, "Is it our own Church?" (1867)
