= Anahuac =

Anahuac or Anáhuac may refer to:

== Places ==
=== Mexico ===
- Anahuac (Aztec), placename used by the Aztecs to refer to the Basin of Mexico
- Anahuac Valley, the ancient (Aztec) name of the Valley of Mexico
- Anáhuac (Monterrey Metro), a rapid transit train station
- Anáhuac Municipality, Nuevo León
- Anáhuac, Chihuahua, or Colonia Anáhuac, a town in Chihuahua

=== United States ===
- Anahuac, Texas
- Anahuac Formation, Texas
- Lake Anahuac, Texas
- Jocelyn Nungaray National Wildlife Refuge, Texas, formerly Anahuac National Wildlife Refuge

== Other uses ==
- Anahuac disturbances
- Anahuac (automobile), an American car briefly produced in 1922
- Fabrica de Aviones Anahuac, a Mexican aircraft manufacturer
- Anahuac University Network, a system of private higher education institutions in Mexico
- Mexican cruiser Anáhuac, in service 1924-38
