= Marble Falls =

Marble Falls may refer to:

- Marble Falls, Arkansas, US
- Marble Falls, Texas, US
  - Marble Falls High School
- Marble Falls Formation, a geologic formation in Texas, US
- Lake Marble Falls, on the Colorado River in Texas Hill Country, US
