= Gober =

Gober may refer to:

- Hershel W. Gober (born 1936), former acting United States Secretary of Veterans Affairs
- Robert Gober (born 1954), American sculptor
- Gober Sosebee (1915-1996), American racecar driver
- Gober, Texas, United States, an unincorporated community

== See also ==
- Gober Chalk, a geologic formation in Texas
