= Chaffin =

Chaffin is a surname. Notable people with the surname include:

- Ceán Chaffin (born 1957), American film producer
- Chad Chaffin (born 1968), American NASCAR driver
- Cleve Chaffin (1885–1959), American carnival musician
- Colonel Chaffin (c. 1826–1873), American little person
- Jessica Chaffin (born 1974), American actress, comedian, and writer

== See also ==
- Battle of Chaffin's Farm, battle during the American Civil War
- Chaffin's Bluff, in Virginia, United States
- Chaffin Formation, geologic formation in Texas
- Chafin
