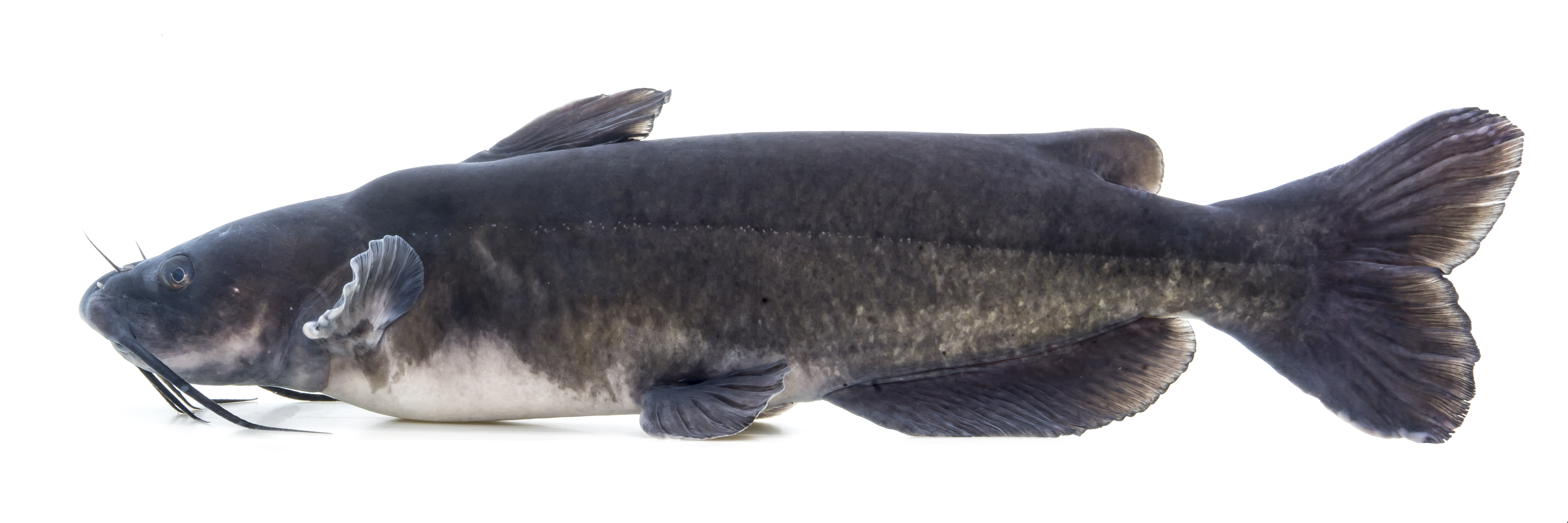

Conservation status
- Least Concern (IUCN 3.1)

- Secure (NatureServe)

Scientific classification
- Kingdom: Animalia
- Phylum: Chordata
- Class: Actinopterygii
- Division: Teleostei
- Order: Siluriformes
- Family: Ictaluridae
- Genus: Ictalurus
- Species: I. punctatus

Binomial name
- Ictalurus punctatus (Rafinesque, 1818)
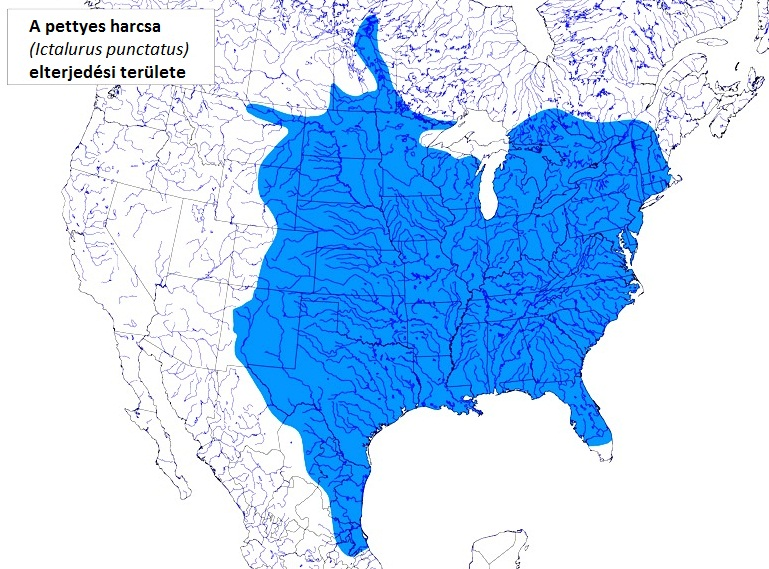

Synonyms
- Silurus punctatus Rafinesque, 1818; †Ictalurus decorus Smith, 1961

= Channel catfish =

Channel catfish Temporal range: Middle Miocene to present

Species of fish

The channel catfish (Ictalurus punctatus), known informally as the "channel cat", is a species of catfish native to North America. They are North America's most abundant catfish species, and the official state fish of Kansas, Missouri, Nebraska and Tennessee. The channel catfish is the most fished species of catfish in the United States, with around 8 million anglers angling them per year. The popularity of channel catfish for food has contributed to the rapid expansion of this species' aquaculture in the United States. It has also been widely introduced to Europe, Asia and South America, and many countries consider it an invasive species.

== Evolution ==
The channel catfish appears to be a rather old species that has persisted for nearly 20 million years, as fossil remains assigned to it are abundant in numerous geological formations of central North America from the Miocene onwards. Fossil remains of the channel catfish are known from the Sheep Creek, Runningwater, Valentine, Ogallala, Ash Hollow and Seymour Formations of the United States. The oldest of these remains are known from the Middle Miocene of South Dakota. These remains were initially assigned to their own extinct species, "Ictalurus decorus" Smith, 1961, but later studies have found these remains to fall within the range of morphological variation of the modern channel catfish, and it has thus been synonymized with it.

== Distribution and habitat ==
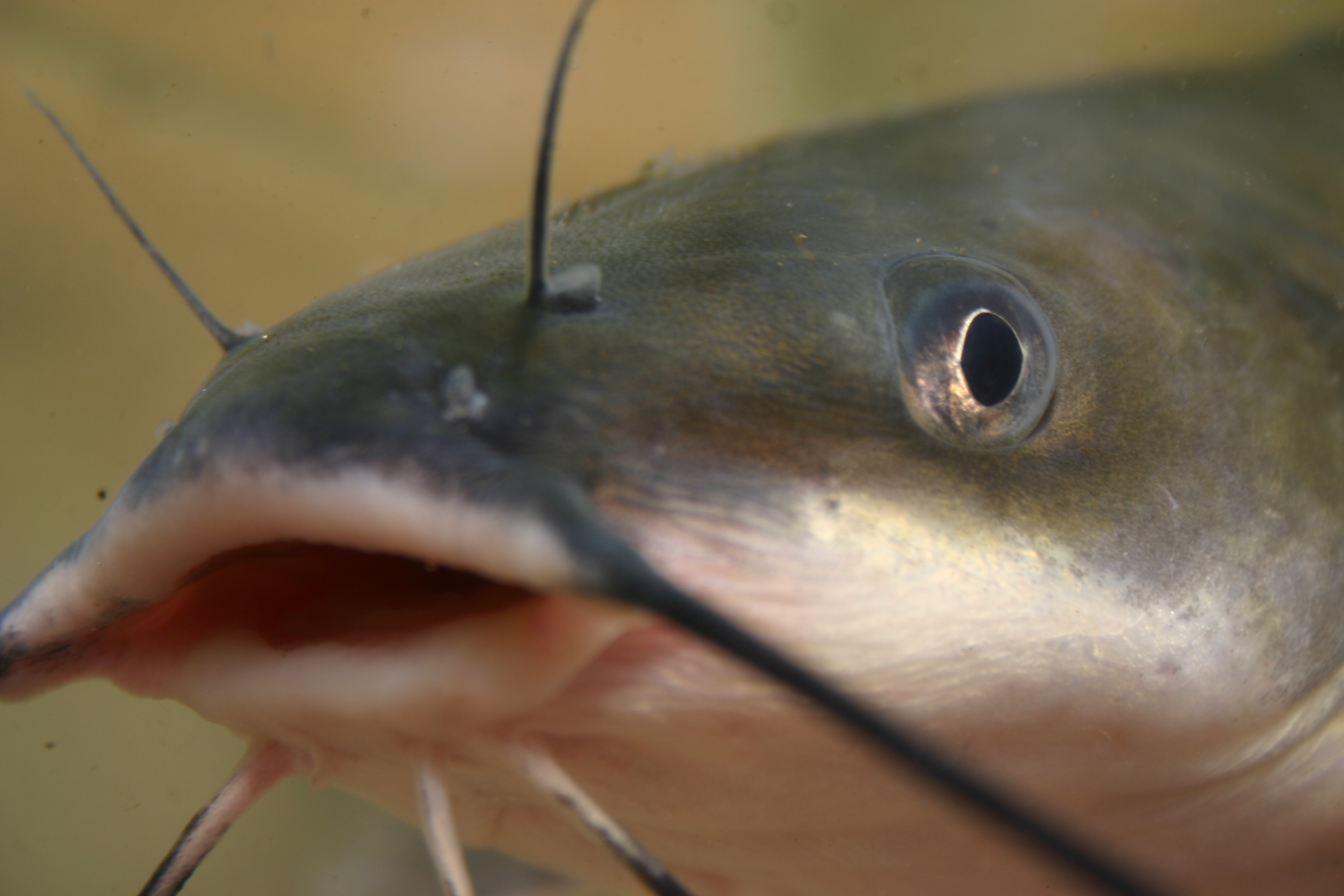
An adult channel catfish.

Channel catfish are native to the Nearctic realm and are widely distributed in southern Canada, the eastern and northern United States, and parts of northern Mexico.

They have an extensive native range consisting of almost all of the United States west of the Appalachian Mountains and east of the Rocky Mountains, roughly following the Mississippi River Basin. They are also native to peninsular Florida. They have also been widely introduced to Atlantic-draining rivers east of the Appalachians and Pacific-draining rivers west of the Rockies, giving them a continent-spanning range. Although they are officially considered introduced to this region, it has been suggested that they may also be native to the Atlantic-draining rivers from the Susquehanna south to the Neuse. Its range in southern Canada includes the Great Lakes (excluding Lake Superior) and parts of the Quebec, Ontario, and Manitoba provinces.

They have also been introduced into some waters of the Czech Republic and Romania, as well as parts of Malaysia and Indonesia.

This species thrives in rivers, reservoirs, lakes, and ponds. Channel catfish are cavity nesters, which means that they lay their eggs in crevices, hollows, or debris to protect them from swift currents.

== Characteristics ==
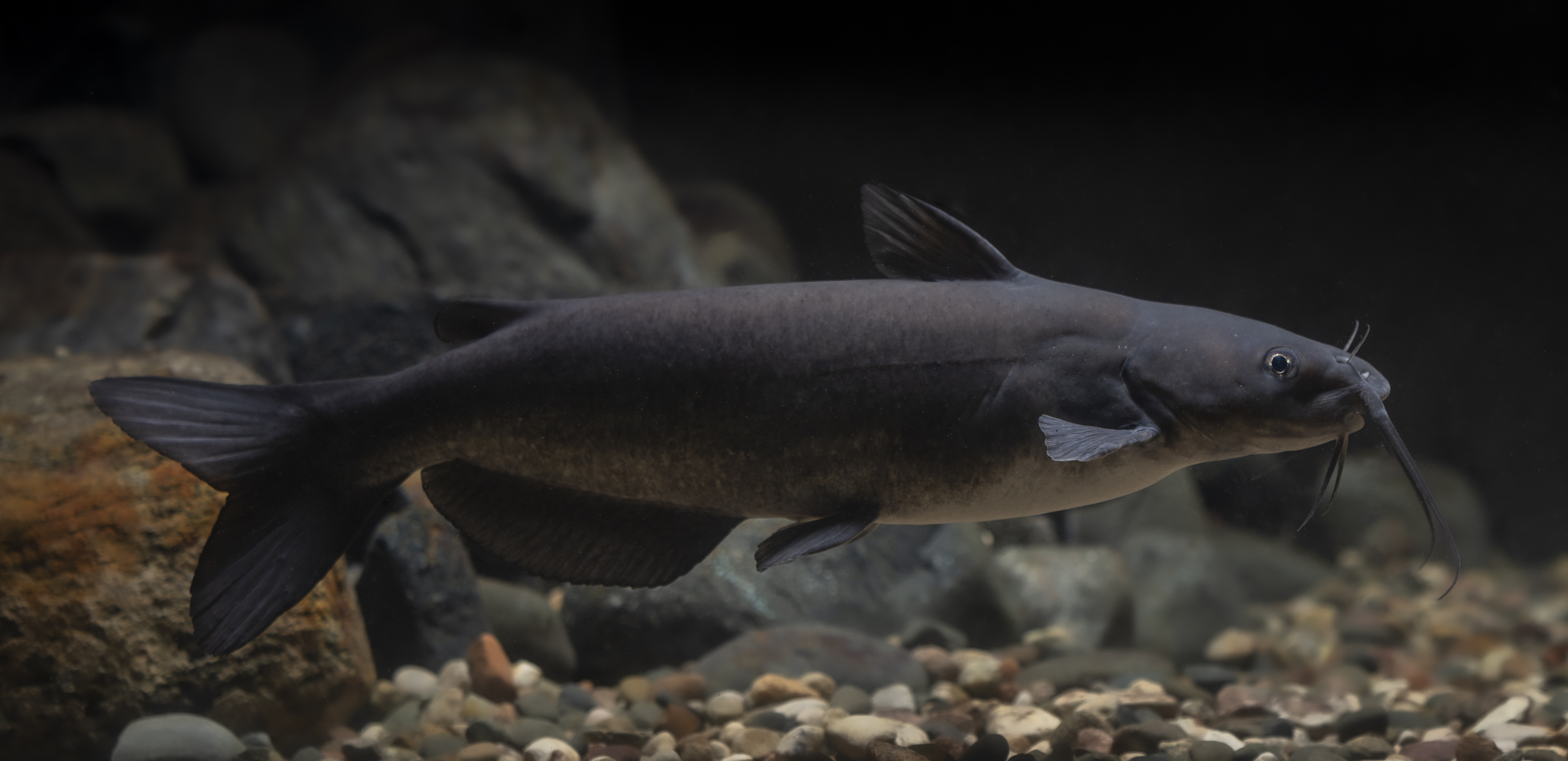
At Gavins Point National Fish Hatchery

Channel catfish have a well developed sense of smell and taste. Their nostril pits (nares) contain sense organs with high concentrations of olfactory receptors. In channel catfish, these organs are sensitive enough to detect several amino acids at about one part per 100 million in water. Also, the channel catfish has taste buds distributed over the surface of its entire body. These buds are especially concentrated on the four pairs of barbels (whiskers) surrounding the mouth, which have about 25 buds per square millimeter. This combination of strong senses of taste and smell allows the channel catfish to find food in dark, stained, or muddy water with relative ease. They also possess a Weberian apparatus, which amplifies sound waves that would otherwise not be perceptible. There is a misconception that the barbels of channel catfish sting upon contact. The barbels lack such capabilities and cannot sting. However, these catfish do have spines on their pectoral and dorsal fins which may cause injury if the fish is handled improperly. There is a common misconception that being pricked by a catfish spine is dangerous: it is no more dangerous than a sting from a mosquito.

=== Length and weight ===
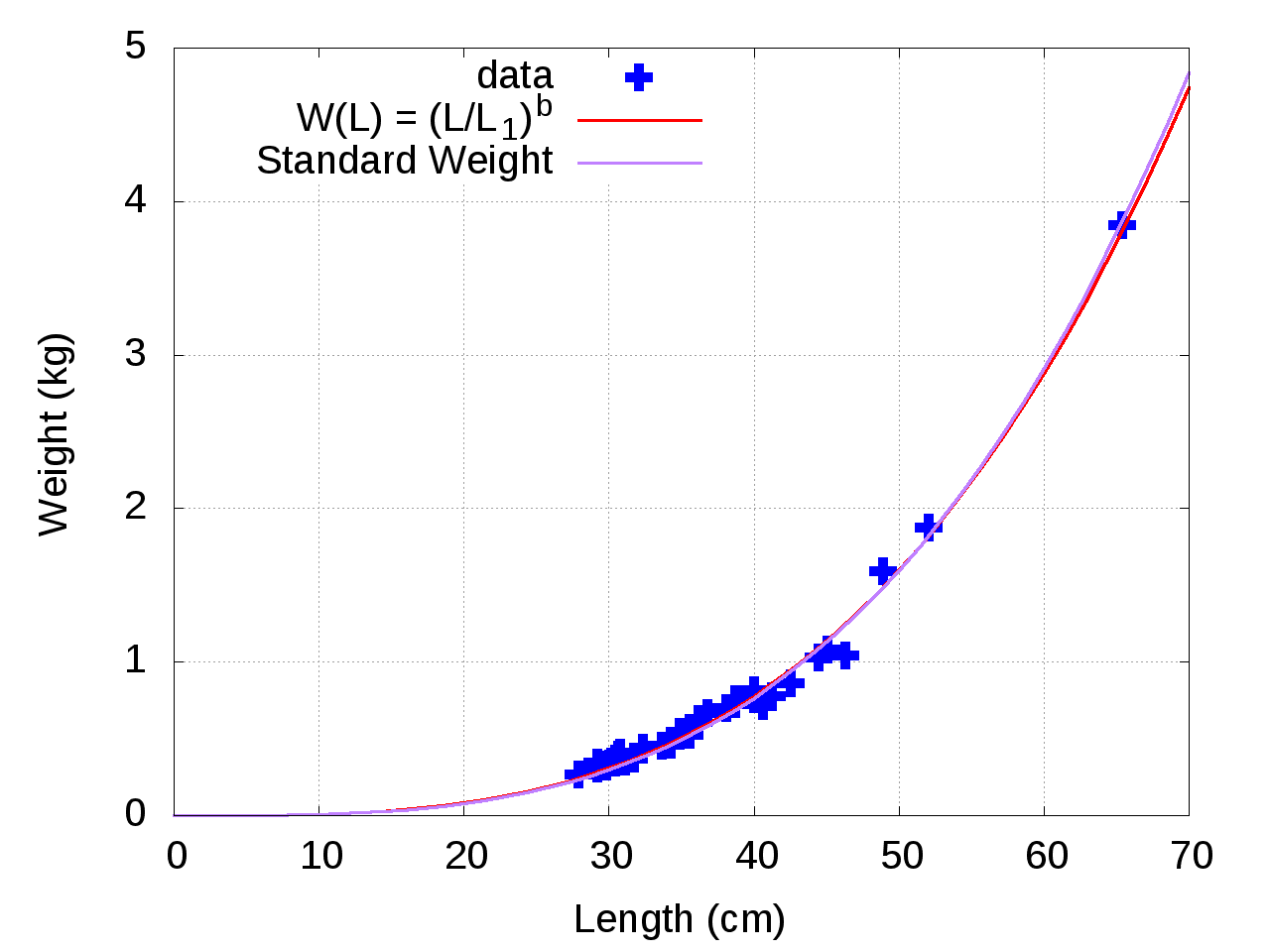
Weight vs. length for channel catfish, where b = 3.2293 and $L_1 = 45.23$ cm

An average adult channel catfish measures at least 12 inches (30 centimeters) long, and weighs between 2 and 4 pounds (0.91 and 1.81 kg). The largest specimen on record weighed 58 pounds (26 kg) and was caught in 1964 by an angler in South Carolina.

As channel catfish grow longer, their weight increases. The relationship between length and weight is not linear. The relationship between length (L, in cm) and weight (W, in kg) for nearly all species of fish can be expressed by an equation of the form:

$$W = (L/L_1)^b\!\,$$

Invariably, b is close to 3.0 for all species, $L_1$ is the length of a typical fish weighing 1 kg. For channel catfish, b = 3.2293, somewhat higher than for many common species, and $L_1 = 45.23$ cm.

== Ecology ==
=== Feeding ===
Catfish have a well-developed taste perception and are called "swimming tongues" due to the presence of taste buds all over the skin and inside the oropharyngeal cavity. Specifically, they have high sensitivity to amino acids, which explains their unique communication methods as follows. The catfish has a facial taste system that is extremely responsive to L-alanine and L-arginine. More specifically, their facial taste system senses heightened levels of L-amino acids in freshwater. Feeding behavior to food is due to amino acids released by food. This is reported to cause maxillary and mandibular barbel movements, which orient the catfish's posture and food search. When the food stimulates the taste receptors, it causes more excitation which is seen in exaggerated biting, turning, or mastication. Like other catfish, channel catfish feed through suction by opening their mouth quickly to create a current into which prey and water rapidly flows. They lack large mouths and, rather than biting and chewing, swallow their prey whole.

==== Diet ====
Adult channel catfish, over 45 centimetres (18 in), prey on fishes such as yellow perch and sunfish. The diet of adults consists of snails, clams, crustaceans (such as crayfish), snakes, frogs, small fish, insects, aquatic plants, algae, seeds, grains, nuts, and occasionally even small birds and small mammals. Younger channel catfish are more consistently omnivorous, eating a large variety of plants and animals.

=== Communication ===
The channel catfish is adapted to limited light conditions. Members of the genus Ictalurus, which lives in muddy waters with very bad sight, do not depend solely on visual cues. Instead, they are known to rely heavily on chemotactic cues. Sound production may be another important means of communication among channel catfish and other species living in turbid habitats.

==== Chemical communication ====
The North American channel catfish is an ostariophysan, or a bony fish living in freshwater habitats. Channel catfish are known to produce club cells and alarm substances for communication purposes. Both the fish's habitat and the presence of chemosensory cells covering the body are presumably the results of favored selection for this method of communication. Catfishes are capable of producing and recognizing individual specific pheromones. Through these pheromones, a catfish can identify not only the species and sex of a conspecific, but also its age, size, reproductive state, or hierarchical social status.

Territoriality in channel catfish is identifiable by a change in body odor, which is recognizable by other members of the same species. This chemical change in the amino-acid composition of the skin mucus can be noted by chromatographic methods, and are not long-lasting; rather, they last only long enough to communicate to other fish in the vicinity. Changes may be the result of the release of the contents of the club cells. These cells do not open directly to the surface of the skin, but injury caused by fighting and other agonistic behaviors may release the cells' contents. Since catfish have a dominance hierarchy system, information relative to the change of status of any fish is important in recognition of the social strata.

==== Signal distinction ====
In the channel catfish, while a communication signal is directed toward the receiver and contains a specific message, an information signal is a part of the general existence of the individual or the group. For example, release of an alarm signal will communicate danger, but the individual's recognition odor is only an information signal identifying one fish from another. With regards to the function and contents of the club cells, the club cells may serve different functions throughout the fish's lifecycle. Variation in the contents of the club cells' information signals therefore may change with the species' needs at different stages of life.

==== Sound production ====
All species of catfishes can generate sound through stridulation, and many can produce sounds through drumming. Stridulation consists of the clicking or grinding of bony parts on the fish's pectoral fins and pectoral girdle, and drumming consists of the contraction of specialized sonic muscles with subsequent reverberation through the swim bladder. Variability in the sound signals created by the channel catfish depends on the mechanism by which the sound is produced, the function of the resultant sound and physical factors such as sex, age, and temperature. This variation may result in increased complexity of the outgoing signal and may allow for increased usefulness of the signal in interspecies communication. In the channel catfish, sounds are produced only by pectoral stridulation, as this species does not express sonic muscles, which are used to produce sound via direct attachments to the swim bladder or to bony plates attached to the swim bladder in certain catfish species.

Because of the peculiar anatomy of its pectoral spine, the channel catfish relies on stridulation for successful underwater communication. This spine, an expanded fin ray with modified articulation at its base, is decorated with serrations and poisonous tissues to dissuade predators. When a fish abducts its pectoral fin, the spine moves over the pectoral girdle channel, producing noises. These noises are distinguished by distinct pulses produced when the ridges on the spine's base interact with the rough surface of the girdle's channel. The wide range and flexibility of motion when using fins is responsible for the variety of these stridulation noises. Different noises serve a variety of communicative purposes, including indicating behavior to predators and expressing dominance.

In many channel catfish, individuals favor one fin or another for stridulatory sound production (in the same way as humans are right-handed or left-handed). The first ray of the channel catfish pectoral fin is a bilaterally symmetrical spinous structure that is minimally important for movement; however, it can be locked as a defensive adaptation or used as a means for sound production. According to one scholar, most fish tend to produce sound with their right fin, although sound production with the left fin has also been observed.

==== Hearing ====
The inferior division of the inner ear, most prominently the utricle, is the primary area of hearing in most fishes. The hearing ability of the channel catfish is enhanced by the presence of the swim bladder. It is the main structure that reverberates the echo from other individuals' sounds, as well as from sonar devices. The volume of the swim bladder changes if fish move vertically, thus is also considered to be the site of pressure sensitivity. The latency of swim bladder adaptation after a change in pressure affects hearing and other possible swim bladder functions, presumably making audition more difficult. Nevertheless, the presence of the swim bladder and a relatively complex auditory apparatus allows the channel catfish to discern different sounds and tell from which directions sounds have come.

==== Communication to predators ====
Pectoral stridulation is the main mean of agonistic communication towards predators in channel catfish. Sudden, relatively loud sounds are used to startle predators in a manner analogous to the well-documented, visual flash display of various lepidopterans. In most catfish, a drumming sound can be produced for this use, and the incidences of the drumming sounds can reach up to 300 or 400 per second. However, the channel catfish must resort instead to stridulation sounds and pectoral spine display for predator avoidance. In addition to communication towards predators, stridulation can be seen as a possible alarm signal to other catfish, in the sense of warning nearby individuals that a predator is near.

== Genetics ==
The channel catfish is one of only a handful of ostariophysan freshwater fish species whose genomes have been sequenced. The channel catfish reference genome sequence was generated alongside genomic sequence data for other fish species (other catfishes, the common pleco and southern striped Raphael; also common carp), in order to provide genomic resources and aid understanding of the evolutionary loss of scales in catfishes. Results from comparative genomics and transcriptomics analyses and experiments involving channel catfish have supported a role for secretory calcium-binding phosphoproteins (SCPP) in scale formation in teleost fishes.

In addition to the whole nuclear genome resources above, full mitochondrial genome sequences have been available for channel catfish since 2003. Other studies of genetic diversity, outcrossing, etc. in channel catfish have focused primarily on inbred lines and farm strains relevant to this species' aquaculture. For example, earlier studies have compared the genetic diversity of domestic versus wild populations of channel catfish using AFLPs.

== Cultural & economic significance ==
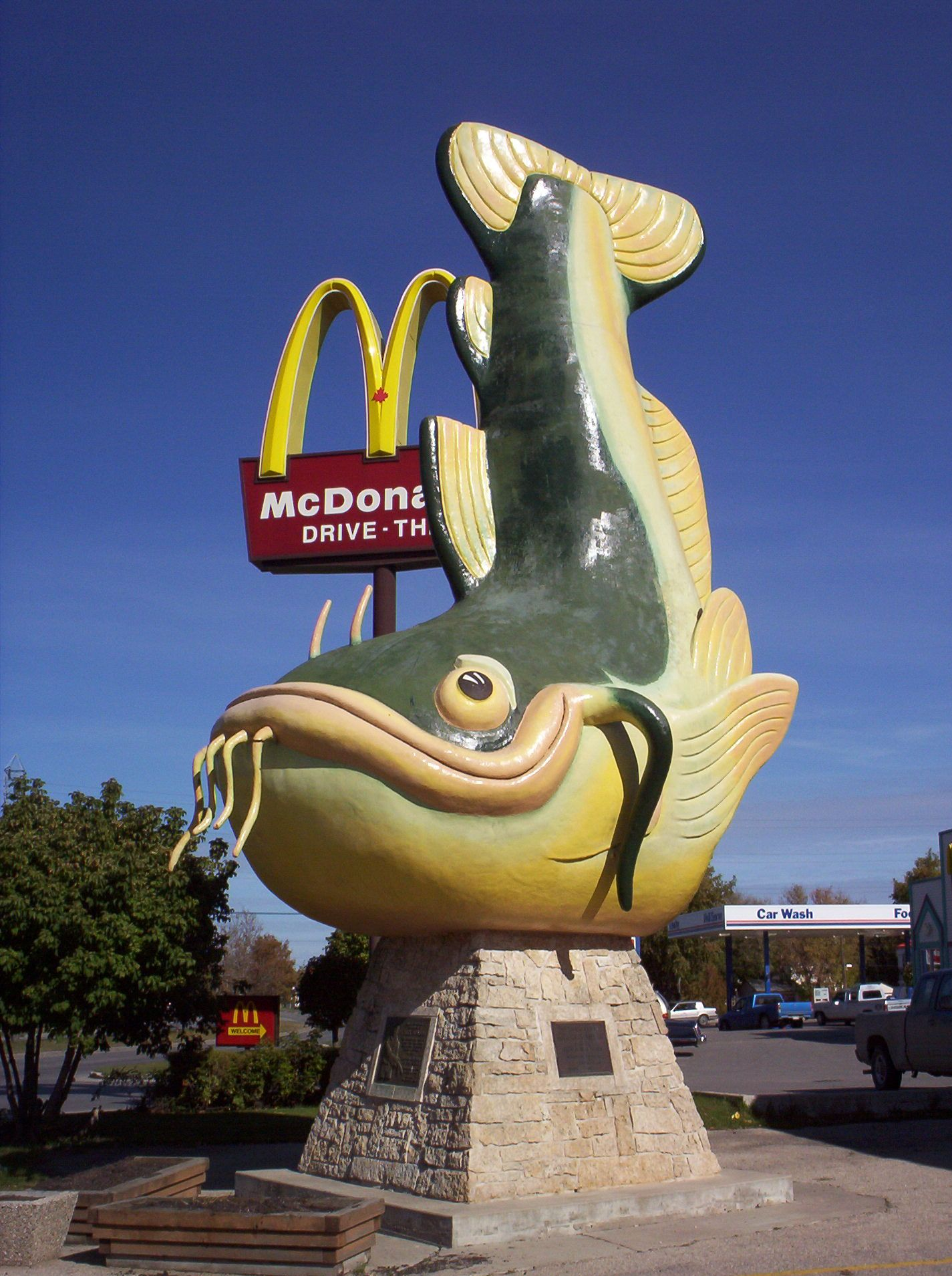
Chuck the Channel Catfish, 1986 roadside sculpture in Selkirk, Manitoba

Global aquaculture production of Channel catfish (Ictalurus punctatus) in thousand tonnes from 1960 to 2022, as reported by the FAO

The channel catfish is an important food source in the southern United States and is valued for the quality of its meat. In the United States, catfish is the largest aquaculture industry, and channel catfish make up 90% of farm-raised catfish. In 2021, catfish farmers in the United States made $421 million in sales. Most catfish farming in the United States occurs in the southeast: Alabama, Arkansas, Louisiana, and Mississippi produce 94% of American farm-raised catfish, with Mississippi responsible for over 50%.

== Fishing ==
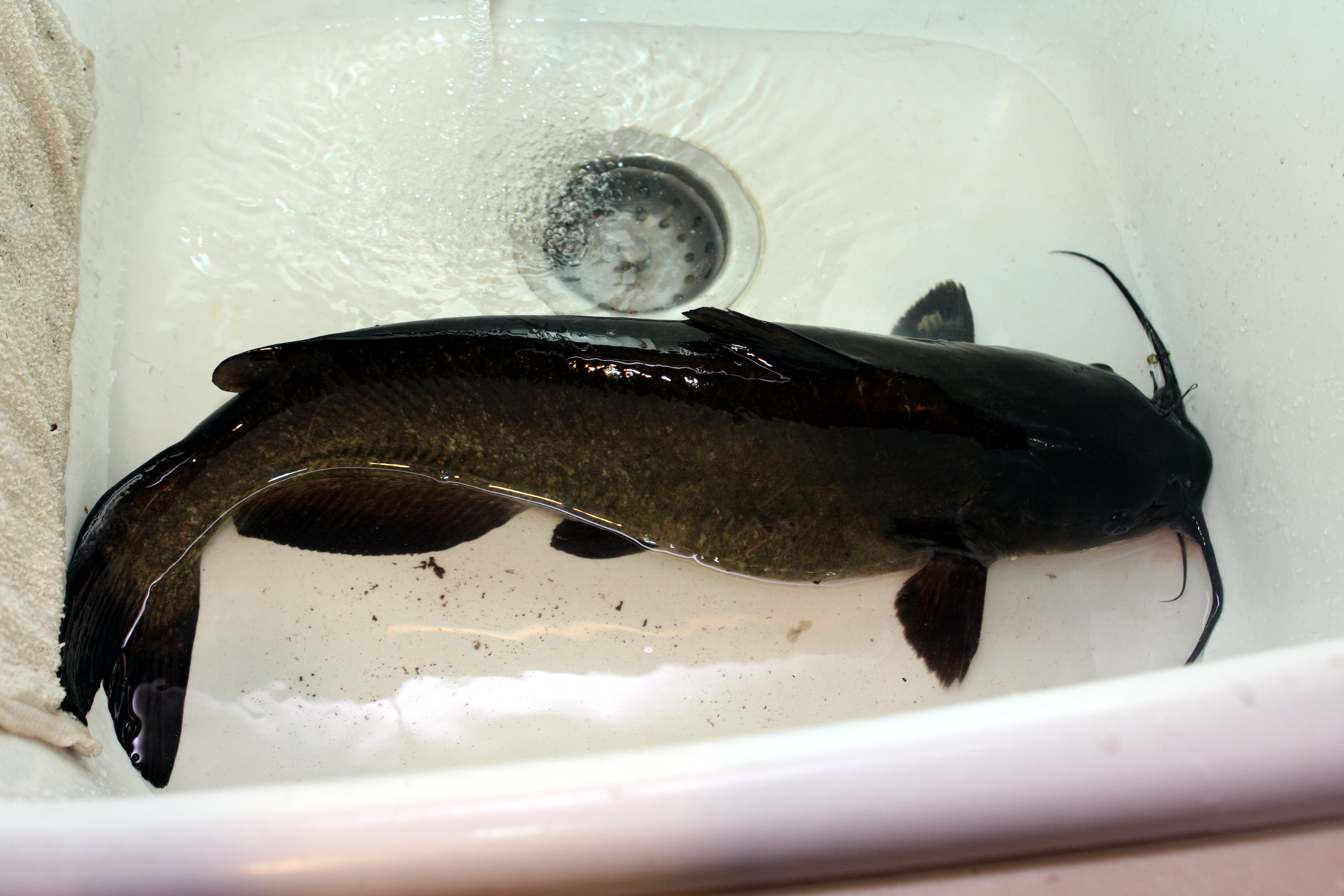
Channel catfish caught in a stocked lake

Channel catfish are omnivores, and can be caught using a variety of natural and prepared baits, including crickets, nightcrawlers, minnows, shad, freshwater drum, crawfish, frogs, bullheads, sunfish, chicken liver, raw steak, hot dogs, and suckers. Catfish have even been known to take Ivory soap as bait.

Juglines, trotlines, limb lines, and bank lines are popular methods of fishing for channel catfish in addition to traditional rod-and-reel fishing. Another method uses traps, either "slat traps"—long wooden traps with an angled entrance—or wire hoop traps. "Stink bait" is typically used in such traps, which may include dog food, rotten cheese and old rotten shad. Catches of as many as 100 fish a day are common in catfish traps. An unusual method practiced in the Southeastern United States is noodling—catching catfish by hand.

When removing the hook from a catfish, anglers should be mindful of the sharp spines on the pectoral and dorsal fins, since they inject venom and may cause injury.

== As an introduced species ==
Although native to a large swathe of North America, channel catfish have still been widely introduced to parts of North America east of the Appalachian Divide and west of the Continental Divide, where they are not native. In these areas, they have been implicated in the decline of numerous native species, leading to local extinctions or reduced species diversity. They are voracious predators on many threatened native fauna, and have been implicated in the extirpation of an isolated eastern population of the trout-perch in the Potomac River basin, in addition to preying on juvenile humpback chub, razorback sucker, and Chiricahua leopard frog in the Southwestern United States. The presence of channel catfish is often associated with a great decline in crayfish species diversity in areas where they have been introduced. Colorado pikeminnow have been known to choke on channel catfish while attempting to prey upon them. They have also hybridized with the endangered Yaqui catfish in New Mexico.

== See also ==
- Wahpper – Sculpture in North Dakota, US
