= Gunsight Limestone Member =

Graham Formation in Texas, United States

- Type: Member
- Unit of: Graham Formation

Location
- Region: Texas
- Country: United States

The Gunsight Limestone Member is a geologic member in Texas. It preserves fossils.

Named in 1919 as the top member of Gunsight formation in Texas, by Frederick B. Plummer. Raymond C. Moore and Plummer assigned the Gunsight limestone to the Graham Formation.

== See also ==
- List of fossiliferous stratigraphic units in Texas
- Paleontology in Texas
