= List of fossiliferous stratigraphic units in Texas =

This article contains a list of fossil-bearing stratigraphic units in the state of Texas, U.S.

== Sites ==
| Group or Formation | Period | Notes |
|---|---|---|
| Admiral Formation | Permian | |
| Aguja Formation | Cretaceous | |
| Alacran Mountain Formation | Permian | |
| Albany Group/Lueders Formation | Permian | |
| Albany Group/Waggoner Ranch Formation | Permian | |
| Aleman Formation | Ordovician | |
| Altuda Formation | Permian | |
| Anacacho Limestone | Cretaceous | |
| Anahuac Formation | Paleogene | |
| Annona Chalk | Cretaceous | |
| Arcadia Park Shale | Cretaceous | |
| Archer City Formation | Permian | |
| Arroyo Formation | Permian | |
| Austin Formation | Cretaceous | |
| Austin Chalk | Cretaceous | |
| Austin Group/Atco Formation | Cretaceous | |
| Austin Group/Ector Formation | Cretaceous | |
| Austin Group/Ector Chalk | Cretaceous | |
| Austin Group/Gober Formation | Cretaceous | |
| Austin Group/Gober Chalk | Cretaceous | |
| Austin Group/Pflugerville Formation | Cretaceous | |
| Austin Group/Roxton Formation | Cretaceous | |
| Banta Shut Formation | Neogene | |
| Barnett Formation | Carboniferous | |
| Barnett Shale | Carboniferous | |
| Bead Mountain Formation | Permian | |
| Beaumont Formation | Pleistocene | |
| Bell Canyon Formation | Permian | |
| Belle Plains Formation | Permian | |
| Bend Group/Smithwick Formation | Carboniferous | |
| Benevides Formation | Cretaceous | |
| Bishop Cap Formation | Carboniferous | |
| Black Peaks Formation | Paleogene | |
| Blaine Formation | Permian | |
| Blanco Formation | United States | |
| Blossom Sand | Cretaceous | |
| Bone Spring Formation | Permian | |
| Bone Spring Limestone | Permian | |
| Boquillas Formation | Cretaceous | |
| Brad Formation | Carboniferous | |
| Bridwell Formation | Neogene | |
| Briggs Formation | Permian | |
| Brushy Canyon Formation | Permian | |
| Buda Limestone | Cretaceous | |
| Caballos Novaculite | Late Devonian to Carboniferous (Mississippian) | |
| Caddo Creek Formation | Carboniferous | |
| Camp Creek Formation | Permian | |
| Camp Rice Formation | United States | |
| Canoe Formation | Paleogene | |
| Canyon Group/Caddo Creek Formation | Carboniferous | |
| Canyon Group/Graford Formation | Carboniferous | |
| Canyon Group/Palo Pinto Formation | Carboniferous | |
| Canyon Group/Winchell Formation | Carboniferous | |
| Canyon Group/Wolf Mountain Formation | Carboniferous | |
| Canyon Group/Wolf Mountain Shale | Carboniferous | |
| Capitan Formation | Permian | |
| Capote Mountain Tuff | Paleogene | |
| Capps Formation | Carboniferous | |
| Catahoula Formation | Paleogene | |
| Cathedral Mountain Formation | Permian | |
| Cerro Alto Limestone | Permian | |
| Chaffin Formation | Carboniferous | |
| Chambers Tuff | Paleogene | |
| Chappel Limestone | Carboniferous | |
| Cherry Canyon Formation | Permian | |
| Chinle Group/Dockum Group | Triassic | |
| Chinle Group/Tecovas Formation | Triassic | |
| Chisos Formation | Paleogene | |
| Chispa Summit Formation | Cretaceous | |
| Cibolo Formation | Permian | |
| Cisco Group/Bluff Creek Formation | Carboniferous | |
| Cisco Group/Graham Formation | Carboniferous | |
| Cisco Group/Pueblo Formation | Permian | |
| Cisco Group/Putnam Formation | Permian | |
| Claiborne Formation | Paleogene | |
| Claiborne Group/Cook Mountain Formation | Paleogene | |
| Claiborne Group/Crockett Formation | Paleogene | |
| Claiborne Group/Reklaw Formation | Paleogene | |
| Claiborne Group/Stone City Formation | Paleogene | |
| Claiborne Group/Weches Formation | Paleogene | |
| Clarendon Beds | Neogene | |
| Clear Fork Formation | Permian | |
| Clear Fork Group/Arroyo Formation | Permian | |
| Clear Fork Group/Vale Formation | Permian | |
| Clear Fork Group/Choza Formation | Permian | |
| Clear Fork Group/Lueders Formation | Permian | |
| Clear Fork Group/Vale Formation | Permian | |
| Clyde Formation | Permian | |
| Coetas Formation | Neogene | |
| Coleman Junction Formation | Permian | |
| Colmena Tuff | Paleogene | |
| Comanche Formation | Cretaceous | |
| Comanche Peak Limestone | Cretaceous | |
| Comanche Group/Paw Paw Formation | Cretaceous | |
| Concha Formation | Permian | |
| Cook Mountain Formation | Paleogene | |
| Corsicana Marl | Cretaceous | |
| Cow Creek Limestone (Cow Creek Formation) | Cretaceous | |
| Crockett Formation | Paleogene | |
| Cutoff Formation | Permian | |
| Cutter Dolomite | Ordovician | |
| Del Rio Clay | Cretaceous | |
| Delaho Formation | Neogene | |
| Delaware Mountain Formation | Permian | |
| Denton Formation | Cretaceous | |
| Devil's Graveyard Formation | Paleogene | |
| Devils River Limestone | Cretaceous | |
| Dockum Formation | Triassic | |
| Dockum Group/Camp Springs Formation | Triassic | |
| Dockum Group/Colorado City Formation | Triassic | |
| Dockum Group/Cooper Canyon Formation | Triassic | |
| Dockum Group/Santa Rosa Sandstone | Triassic | |
| Dockum Group/Tecovas Formation | Triassic | |
| Dockum Group/Trujillo Formation | Triassic | |
| Dog Creek Formation | Permian | |
| Eagle Ford Formation | Cretaceous | |
| Eagle Ford Group/Britton Formation | Cretaceous | |
| Eagle Ford Shale | Cretaceous | |
| Eagle Ford Group/Britton Formation | Cretaceous | |
| Eagle Ford Group/Lake Waco Formation | Cretaceous | |
| Eagle Ford Group/Tarrant Formation | Cretaceous | |
| East Mountain Shale | Carboniferous | |
| Edwards Limestone | Cretaceous | |
| Edwards Group/Segovia Formation | Cretaceous | |
| El Paso Formation | Ordovician | |
| El Paso Group/Florida Formation | Ordovician | |
| El Paso Group/McKelligon Canyon Formation | Ordovician | |
| El Paso Group/Padre Formation | Ordovician | |
| El Paso Group/Scenic Drive Formation | Ordovician | |
| El Picacho Formation | Cretaceous | |
| Ellenburger Group | Ordovician | |
| Ellenburger Group/Honeycut Formation | Ordovician | |
| Ellenburger Group/Tanyard Formation | Ordovician | |
| Escondido Formation | Cretaceous | |
| Fayette Sandstone | Paleogene | |
| Fleming Formation | Neogene | |
| Fort Hancock Formation | Pleistocene | |
| Fort Peña Formation | Ordovician | |
| Fort Worth Limestone | Cretaceous | |
| Fredericksburg Group/Comanche Peak Limestone | Cretaceous | |
| Fredericksburg Group/Edwards Limestone | Cretaceous | |
| Fredericksburg Group/Goodland Formation | Cretaceous | |
| Fredericksburg Group/Stuart City Formation | Cretaceous | |
| Fredericksburg Group/Walnut Formation | Cretaceous | |
| Fredericksburg Group/Glen Rose Limestone | Cretaceous | |
| Fredericksburg Group/Paluxy Formation | Cretaceous | |
| Gaptank Formation | Carboniferous | |
| Glen Rose Formation | Cretaceous | |
| Goliad Formation | Neogene | |
| Goodland Limestone | Cretaceous | |
| Goodnight Beds | Neogene | |
| Gorman Formation | Ordovician | |
| Graford Formation | Carboniferous | |
| Graham Formation | Carboniferous | |
| Graham Group/Gunsight Formation | United States | |
| Graham Group/Jacksboro Limestone | Carboniferous | |
| Graham Group/Wayland Formation | United States | |
| Grayson Formation | Cretaceous | |
| Grayson Marl | Cretaceous | |
| Gulf Group/Woodbine Formation | Cretaceous | |
| Hammett Formation | Cretaceous | |
| Hammett Shale | Cretaceous | |
| Hannold Hill Formation | Paleogene | |
| Harpersville Formation | Carboniferous | |
| Helms Formation | Carboniferous | |
| Hess Formation | Permian | |
| Hogeye Tuff | Paleogene | |
| Honeycut Formation | Ordovician | |
| Houy Formation | Devonian to Carboniferous (Mississippian) | |
| Hueco Formation | Permian | |
| Hueco Canyon Formation | Permian | |
| Jackson Formation | Paleogene | |
| Jackson Group/Wellborn Formation | Paleogene | |
| Javelina Formation | Cretaceous | |
| Kamp Ranch Limestone | Cretaceous | |
| Kemp Clay | Cretaceous | |
| Keys Valley Marl Member | Cretaceous | |
| Kiamichi Shale (Kiamichi Formation) | Cretaceous | |
| Kincaid Formation | Paleogene | |
| Lake Waco Formation | Cretaceous | |
| Laredo Formation | Paleogene | |
| Lazy Bend Formation | Carboniferous | |
| Lenox Hills Formation | Permian | |
| Lone Camp Group/East Mountain Formation | Carboniferous | |
| Love Formation | United States | |
| Lueders Formation | Permian | |
| Magdalen Limestone | Carboniferous | |
| Magdalena Formation | Carboniferous to Permian (?) | |
| Main Street Limestone | Cretaceous | |
| Malone Formation | Late Jurassic | |
| Mancos Shale | Cretaceous | |
| Marathon Formation | Ordovician | |
| Marble Falls Formation | Carboniferous | |
| Midway Formation | Paleogene | |
| Midway Group/Anacacho Limestone | Cretaceous | |
| Midway Group/Kincaid Formation | Paleogene | |
| Midway Group/Shark River Formation | Paleogene | |
| Midway Group/Wills Point Formation | Paleogene | |
| Millsap Lake Group/Lazy Bend Formation | Carboniferous | |
| Mineral Wells Formation | Carboniferous | |
| Mingus Formation | Carboniferous | |
| Montoya Group | Ordovician | |
| Montoya Group/Aleman Formation | Ordovician | |
| Montoya Group/Cutter Formation | Ordovician | |
| Montoya Group/Second Value Formation | Ordovician | |
| Moore Hollow Group/Wilberns Formation | Cambrian | |
| Moran Formation | Permian | |
| Nacatoch Sand | Cretaceous | |
| Navarro Formation | Cretaceous | |
| Navarro Group/Kemp Clay | Cretaceous | |
| Navarro Group/Neylandville Marl | Cretaceous | |
| Neal Ranch Formation | Early Permian | |
| Neylandville Marl | Cretaceous | |
| Oakville Formation | Neogene | |
| Obregon Formation | Carboniferous | |
| Ogallala Formation | Neogene | |
| Ojinaga Formation | Cretaceous | |
| Ozan Formation | Cretaceous | |
| Paluxy Formation | Cretaceous | |
| Pease River Group/San Angelo Formation | Permian | |
| Pease River Group/San Angelo Group/Blaine Formation | Permian | |
| Pecan Gap Chalk | Cretaceous | |
| Pen Formation | Cretaceous | |
| Pepper Shale | Cretaceous | |
| Pillar Bluff Limestone | Devonian | |
| Pruett Formation | Paleogene | |
| Pueblo Formation | Carboniferous | |
| Putnam Formation | Permian | |
| Quartermaster Formation | Permian | |
| Rawls Formation | Neogene | |
| Reklaw Formation | Paleogene | |
| Riley Formation | Cambrian | |
| Rita Blanca Formation | Pleistocene | |
| Road Canyon Formation | Permian | |
| Ross Mine Formation | Permian | |
| Rustler Formation | Permian | |
| Sabinetown Bluff Formation | Paleogene | |
| Salesville Formation | Carboniferous | |
| San Andres Formation | Permian | |
| San Carlos Formation | Cretaceous | |
| Second Value Dolomite | Ordovician | |
| Sedwick Formation | Permian | |
| Seguin Formation | Paleogene | |
| Selman Formation | Paleogene | |
| Seymour Formation | Pleistocene | |
| Shuler Formation | Late Jurassic | |
| Skinner Mountain Formation | Permian | |
| Skinner Ranch Formation | Permian | |
| Sligo Formation | Cretaceous | |
| Smithwick Formation | Carboniferous | |
| Starcke Limestone | Silurian | |
| Stone City Formation | Paleogene | |
| Strawn Formation | Carboniferous | |
| Strawn Group/Grindstone Formation | Carboniferous | |
| Strawn Group/Millsap Lake Formation | Carboniferous | |
| Sullivan Peak Formation | Permian | |
| Tahoka Formation | Pleistocene | |
| Talpa Formation | Permian | |
| Tanyard Formation | Ordovician | |
| Taylor Marl | Cretaceous | |
| Taylor Group/Sprinkle Formation | Cretaceous | |
| Taylor Group/Wolfe City Formation | Cretaceous | |
| Taylor Group/Wolfe City Group/Sprinkle Formation | Cretaceous | |
| Tecovas Formation | Triassic | |
| Tesnus Formation | Carboniferous | |
| Thrifty Formation | Carboniferous | |
| Torcer Formation | Cretaceous | |
| Tornillo Formation | Paleogene, Cretaceous | |
| Tornillo Group/Javelina Formation | Cretaceous | |
| Travis Peak Formation | Cretaceous | |
| Trinity Formation | Cretaceous | |
| Trinity Group/Antlers Formation | Cretaceous | |
| Trinity Group/Bluff Mesa Formation | Cretaceous | |
| Trinity Group/Cuchillo Formation | Cretaceous | |
| Trinity Group/Glen Rose Formation | Cretaceous | |
| Trinity Group/Glen Rose Group/Paluxy Formation | Cretaceous | |
| Trinity Group/Hensel Sand | Cretaceous | |
| Trinity Group/Paluxy Formation | Cretaceous | |
| Trinity Group/Twin Mountains Formation | Cretaceous | |
| Tule Formation | Pleistocene | |
| Twin Mountains Formation | Cretaceous | |
| Vale Formation | Permian | |
| Valera Shale | Permian | |
| Vidrio Formation | Permian | |
| Vieja Formation | Paleogene | |
| Waggoner Ranch Formation | Permian | |
| Waldrip Formation | Carboniferous | |
| Walnut Formation | Cretaceous | |
| Washita Formation | Cretaceous | |
| Washita Group/Del Rio Formation | Cretaceous | |
| Washita Group/Denison Formation | Cretaceous | |
| Washita Group/Denton Formation | Cretaceous | |
| Washita Group/Duck Creek Formation | Cretaceous | |
| Washita Group/Fort Worth Formation | Cretaceous | |
| Washita Group/Grayson Marl | Cretaceous | |
| Washita Group/Main Street Limestone | Cretaceous | |
| Washita Group/Pawpaw Formation | Cretaceous | |
| Washita Group/Weno Limestone | Cretaceous | |
| Weches Formation | Paleogene | |
| Weno Formation | Cretaceous | |
| Whitehorse Formation | Permian | |
| Wichita Formation | Permian | |
| Wichita Group/Admiral Formation | Permian | |
| Wichita Group/Archer City Formation | Permian | |
| Wichita Group/Belle Plains Formation | Permian | |
| Wichita Group/Clyde Formation | Permian | |
| Wichita Group/Lueders Formation | Permian | |
| Wichita Group/Moran Formation | Permian | |
| Wichita Group/Nocona Formation | Permian | |
| Wichita Group/Petrolia Formation | Permian | |
| Wichita Group/Waggoner Ranch Formation | Permian | |
| Wichita Group/Putnam Formation | Permian | |
| Wichita Group/Waggoner Ranch Formation | Permian | |
| Wilberns Formation | Cambrian | |
| Wilcox Group/Rockdale Formation | Paleogene | |
| Wills Point Formation | Paleogene | |
| Winchell Formation | Carboniferous | |
| Wolf Mountain Formation | Carboniferous | |
| Wolfe City Formation | Cretaceous | |
| Woodbine Formation | Cretaceous | |
| Woods Hollow Formation | Middle Ordovician | |
| Word Formation | Permian | |
| Yegua Formation | Paleogene | |
| Yucca Formation | Cretaceous | |

== See also ==
- Paleontology in Texas
