= Waldrip =

Waldrip is a surname. Notable people with the surname include:

- Steve Waldrip, American attorney, businessman, and politician
- Victoria Rose Waldrip, better known as Woah Vicky, American influencer

== See also ==
- Arkansas Times LP v. Waldrip, court case in the U.S. Court of Appeals for the Eighth Circuit
- Waldrip Formation, geologic formation in Texas, U.S.
- Waldrip Ledge, ledge on Mount Aldrich in the Ross Dependency, Antarctica
