= Duck Creek Formation =

Geologic formation in Texas, United States

- Stratigraphic range: Cretaceous
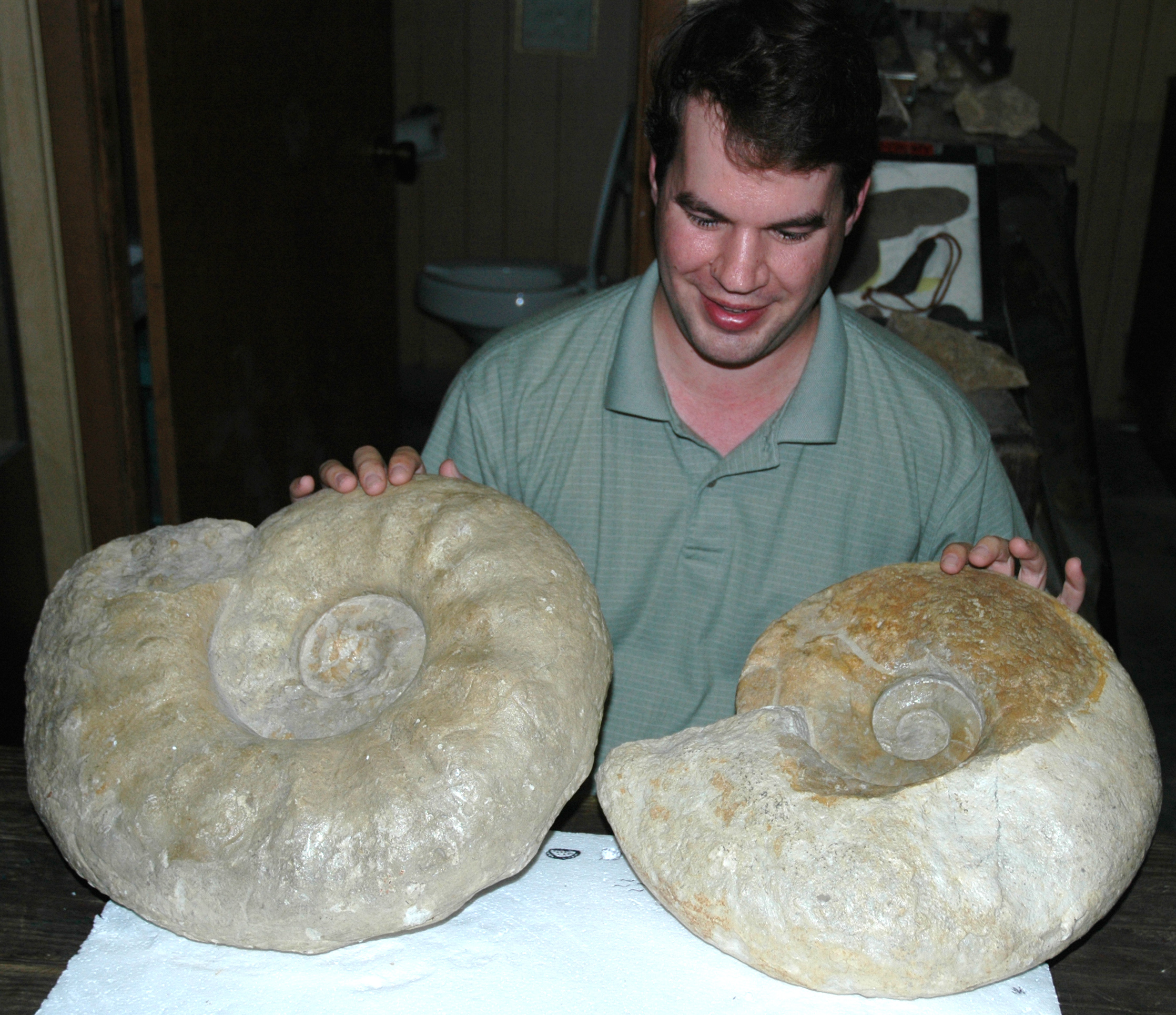
- Ammonites from the Duck Creek Formation
- Type: Formation
- Unit of: Washita Group

Location
- Region: Texas
- Country: United States

The Duck Creek Formation is a geologic formation in Texas. It preserves fossils dating back to the Cretaceous period.

== Invertebrate Paleofauna ==
- Neithia
- Gryphaea
- Eopachydiscus

E. marcianus
E. laevicanaliculatum

- Mortoniceras

M. equidistans
M. fortworthens

- Idohamites fredmonti
- Macraster

== Vertebrate Paleofauna ==
- Leptostyrax macrorhiza
- Reidus hilli

== See also ==
- List of fossiliferous stratigraphic units in Texas
- Paleontology in Texas
