= Anacacho Limestone =

- Stratigraphic range: Cretaceous
- Type: Formation

Location
- Region: Texas
- Country: United States

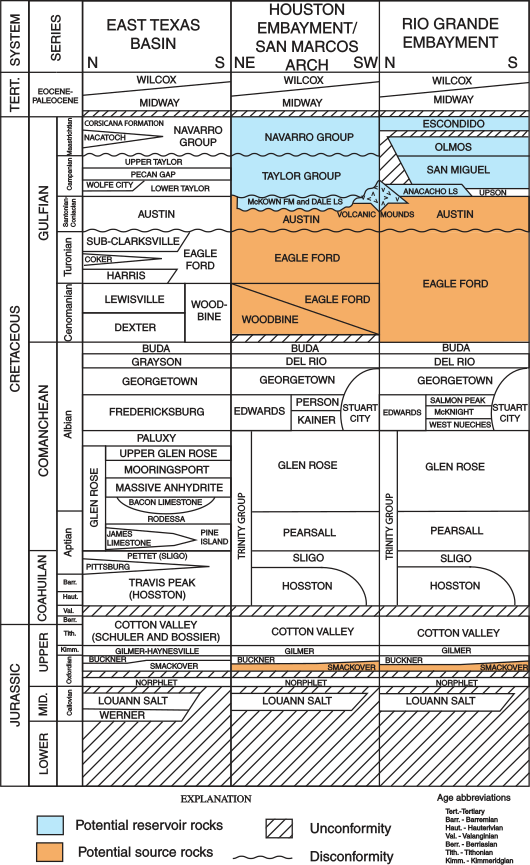
Anacacho Limestone stratigraphic column in Texas

The Anacacho Limestone is a unit of limestone of Cretaceous (Campanian) age in Texas.

== Description ==
The Anacacho Limestone is composed predominantly of limestone (wackestone, packstone, and grainstone).

== Geographic Extent ==
Outcrops of the Anacacho Limestone are present in Kinney, Uvalde, Medina, and Bexar Counties of Texas.

== Stratigraphic Setting ==
The Anacacho Limestone overlies the Upson Clay, and is overlain by the Corsicana Marl.

== Age ==
The Anacacho Limestone is of Cretaceous (Campanian) age.

== Interpretation of Depositional Environment ==
Most of the Anacacho Limestone is interpreted as having accumulated in relatively shallow (<50 m depth) marine water.

== See also ==
- List of fossiliferous stratigraphic units in Texas
- Paleontology in Texas
