= Vampyrocamelus =

Vampyrocamelus Temporal range: Miocene (Clarendonian)

Scientific classification
- Kingdom: Animalia
- Phylum: Chordata
- Class: Mammalia
- Order: Artiodactyla
- Family: Camelidae
- Subfamily: Camelinae
- Tribe: Lamini
- Genus: †Vampyrocamelus; Marriott et al., 2026

Type species
- Vampyrocamelus welshi Marriott et al., 2026

Synonyms
- "Machairocamelus" (nomen nudum)

Extinct genus of camelid

Vampyrocamelus is an extinct genus of camelid from the middle-late Miocene (Clarendonian) of North America. It contains a single species, Vampyrocamelus welshi. Vampyrocamelus is an early lamin (llama relative), with very large fang-like canines (C1/c1) and upper first premolars (P1) in males. In other regards it is very similar to Aepycamelus, a large and long-legged camelid sometimes called the "giraffe camel". Vampyrocamelus is common in the Clarendon beds of Texas and Oklahoma, and it is also present (albeit rare) in the Ash Hollow Formation of Nebraska.

== Discovery ==
Fossils now recognized as Vampyrocamelus were collected over the course of the mid-20th century by Childs Frick and his colleagues at the American Museum of Natural History. The Frick Laboratory never formally named most of their camelid fossils, though some specimen cabinets were labelled as "Machairocamelus" ("knife camel"), a nomen nudum for Vampyrocamelus. Vampyrocamelus was formally named by Marriott et al. (2026) as part of a large-scale revision of North American camelids. The generic name references vampires in recognition of its fang-like teeth, while the specific name honors fossil camel researcher Ed Welsh.

Nearly all Vampyrocamelus fossils, including many well-preserved skulls, come from the Clarendon beds of Donley County, Texas and nearby areas of Oklahoma. The Clarendon beds are the namesake of the Clarendonian North American Land Mammal Age (NALMA), which overlaps the boundary between the Middle and Late Miocene. A snout fragment and isolated upper canine are also recorded from Brown County, Nebraska, in the Merritt Dam Member of the Ash Hollow Formation. These rare northerly finds are late Clarendonian in age. It is possible that many Aepycamelus postcranial fossils actually belong to Vampyrocamelus, as the two genera are hard to distinguish beyond their teeth.

== Description ==
Vampyrocamelus is a large camelid, with an average skull length of 41 cm (16 in). Its dental formula is 1.1.3-4.33.1.4.3. The snout ends at a slender pointed premaxilla lacking the first two upper incisors (I1-I2). The third upper incisor (I3) is small and pointed. In males, the upper canine (C1) and first upper premolar (P1) are very large and fang-shaped, curving back to a pointed tip. In some skulls, C1 exceeds 4 cm (1.6 in) in length. These fangs are more prominent than even the larger species of Aepycamelus, which have longer skulls on average. Female Vampyrocamelus skulls are close to the size of male skulls, though with short peg-like C1 and P1.

Beyond the size of C1 and P1, Vampyrocamelus is indistinguishable from Aepycamelus. The naris (bony nostril opening) is large and diamond-shaped. The cheek teeth (P2-P4, M1-M3) are more hypsodont (higher-crowned) than Oxydactylus but less than Megatylopus or Procamelus. The nasal bones (at the upper edge of the snout) are arched, like other lamins. Each lower jaw has three broadly flared incisors (i1-i3). The lower canine (c1) and first lower premolar (p1) are conical fangs, though smaller and less curved than their upper equivalents. The lower molars (m1-m3) have subtle inflections at their outer front corners, a feature consistent with lamin affinities. There is some individual variation in male Vampyrocamelus skulls: one has a shortened diastema (gap) between C1 and P1, and another has a doubled p1.

Associated postcrania include a robust scapula (shoulder blade) and various fragmentary limb bones. The ulna and radius (forearm bones) are completely fused, the metacarpals and metatarsals (raised "hand" and "foot" bones) are very long and closely-packed, and the tibia is by far the longest bone of the hindlimb. The limb anatomy of Vampyrocamelus is fully consistent with the extremely long and slender limbs of Aepycamelus.
