= Comanche Peak Limestone =

Geologic formation in Texas, US

- Stratigraphic range: Cretaceous
- Type: Formation
- Underlies: Edwards Limestone
- Overlies: Walnut Formation
- Thickness: 15 - 80 ft.

Lithology
- Primary: Limestone
- Other: Shale

Location
- Region: Texas
- Country: United States

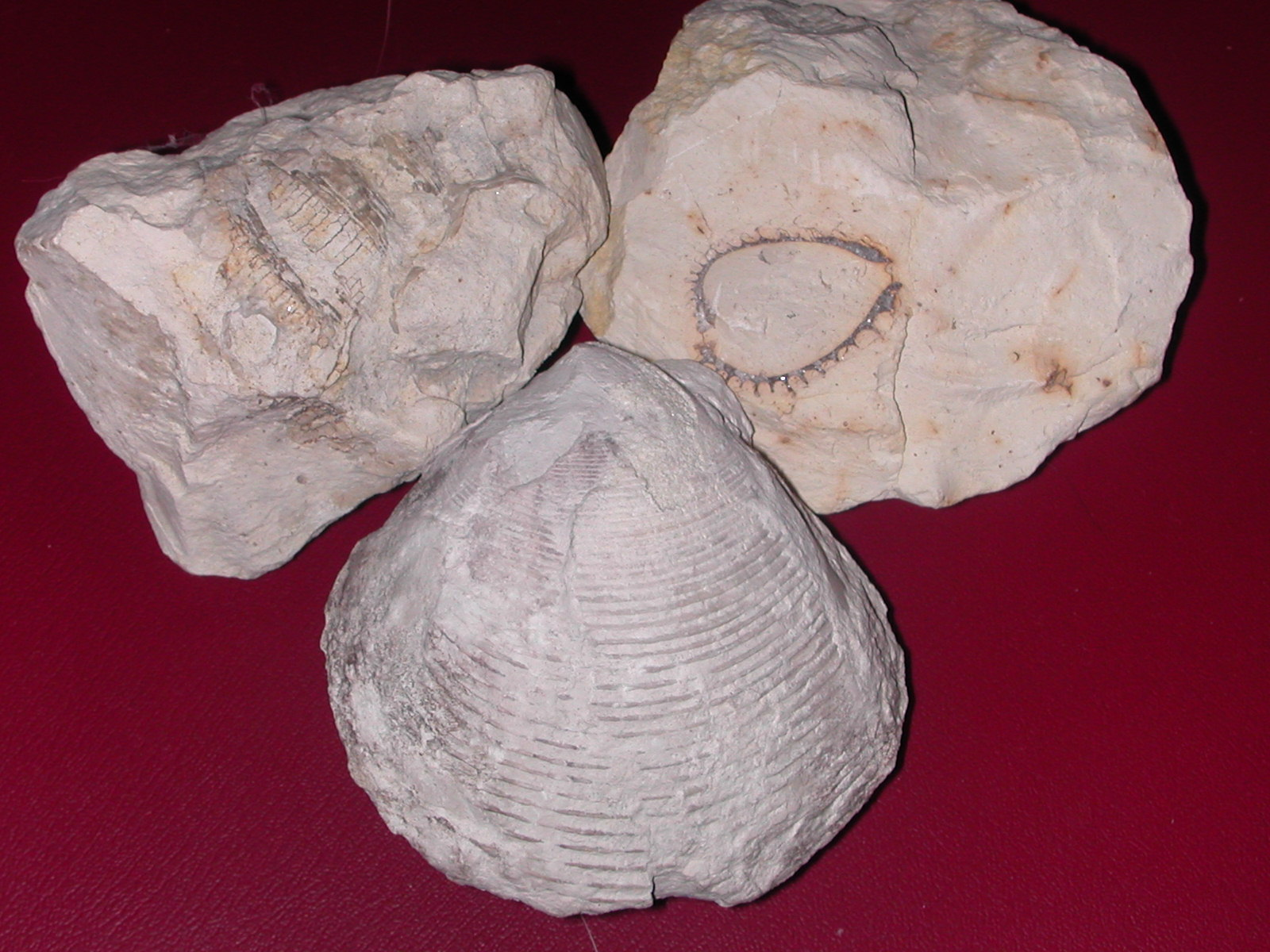
Bivalve and coral fossils collected from the Comanche Peak Limestone near Waco, Texas.

The Comanche Peak Limestone is a geologic formation in Texas. It preserves fossils dating from the Early Cretaceous (Albian).

== See also ==
- List of fossiliferous stratigraphic units in Texas
- Paleontology in Texas
