= Caballos Novaculite =

Geologic formation in Texas

- Stratigraphic range: Devonian
- Type: Formation

Location
- Region: Texas
- Country: United States

The Caballos Novaculite is a geologic formation in Texas. It preserves fossils dating back to the Devonian period.

== See also ==
- List of fossiliferous stratigraphic units in Texas
- Paleontology in Texas
