= Ellenburger Group =

Geologic group in Texas, United States

- Stratigraphic range: Ordovician
- Type: Group
- Sub-units: Tanyard, Gorman and Honeycut Formation

Lithology
- Primary: limestone and dolomite

Location
- Region: Texas, Llano Uplift
- Country: United States

The Ellenburger Group is a geologic group in Texas. It preserves fossils dating back to the Ordovician period.

== See also ==
- List of fossiliferous stratigraphic units in Texas
- Paleontology in Texas
