= Tanyard Formation =

Geologic formation in Texas, United States

- Stratigraphic range: Ordovician
- Type: Formation
- Unit of: Ellenburger Group

Location
- Region: Texas
- Country: United States

The Tanyard Formation is a geologic formation in Texas. It preserves fossils dating back to the Ordovician period.

== See also ==
- List of fossiliferous stratigraphic units in Texas
- Paleontology in Texas
