= Kiamichi Shale =

Geologic formation in Arkansas and Texas

- Stratigraphic range: Cretaceous
- Type: Formation
- Unit of: Fredericksburg Group
- Underlies: Woodbine Formation
- Overlies: Goodland Formation
- Thickness: 20 ft (6.1 m) in Arkansas

Lithology
- Primary: Shale

Location
- Region: Arkansas, Texas
- Country: United States

Type section
- Named by: Robert Thomas Hill

The Kiamichi Shale or Kiamichi Formation is a geologic formation in Arkansas and Texas. It preserves fossils dating back to the Cretaceous period.

== See also ==
- List of fossiliferous stratigraphic units in Texas
- Paleontology in Texas
