= Beaumont Formation =

Geologic formation in Texas, United States

- Stratigraphic range: Pleistocene
- Type: Formation
- Overlies: Lissie Formation
- Thickness: 300 to 900 feet

Lithology
- Primary: clay

Location
- Region: Texas
- Country: United States

Type section
- Named for: Beaumont, Texas

The Beaumont Formation is a geologic formation in Texas. It preserves fossils dating back to the Pleistocene period.

== See also ==
- List of fossiliferous stratigraphic units in Texas
- Paleontology in Texas
