= Stone City Formation =

Geologic formation in Texas, United States

- Stratigraphic range: Paleogene
- Type: Formation

Location
- Region: Texas
- Country: United States

The Stone City Formation is a geologic formation in Texas. It preserves fossils dating back to the Paleogene period. Now known as Stone City Bluff in Burleson County, Texas, it is a special location on the Texas Gulf Coast Plain. It is the best of relatively few places where marine rocks of Paleogene age are exposed and available for public access. This access provides a window into Middle Eocene rocks that were deposited in the Gulf of Mexico approximately 41.8 million years ago.

== See also ==
- List of fossiliferous stratigraphic units in Texas
- Paleontology in Texas
