= Wilberns Formation =

Geologic formation in Texas, United States

- Stratigraphic range: Cambrian
- Type: Formation
- Unit of: Moore Hollow Group

Lithology
- Primary: sandstone, limestone, shale
- Other: upper mixture of limestone and dolomite

Location
- Region: Texas
- Country: United States

The Wilberns Formation is a geologic formation in Texas. It preserves fossils dating back to the Cambrian period.

== See also ==
- List of fossiliferous stratigraphic units in Texas
- Paleontology in Texas
