= Cisco Group =

- Stratigraphic range: Carboniferous
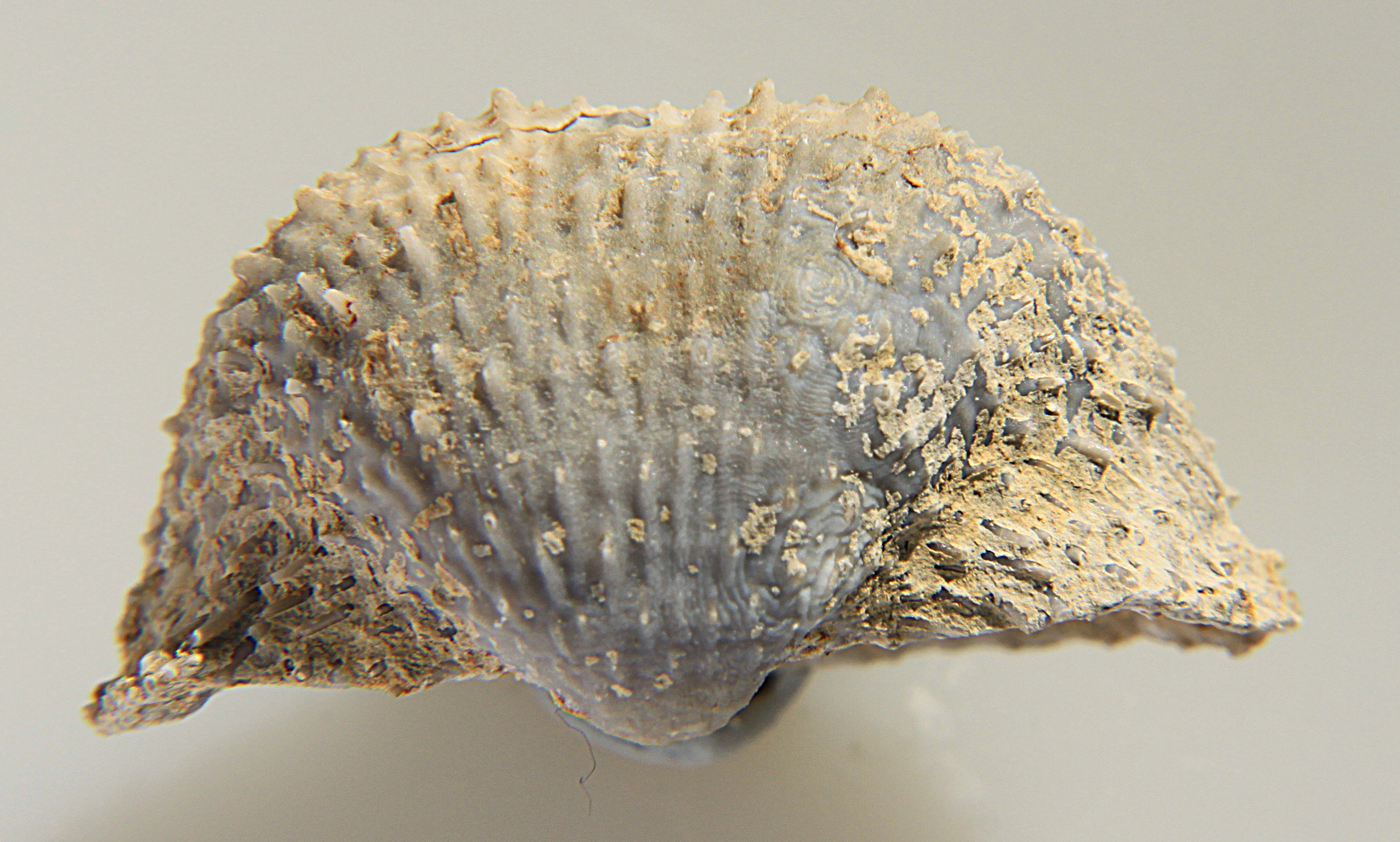
- Fossil from the Pueblo Formation, Cisco Group
- Type: Group
- Sub-units: Pueblo Formation

Location
- Region: Texas
- Country: United States

The Cisco Group is a geologic group in Texas. It preserves fossils dating back to the Carboniferous period.

== See also ==
- List of fossiliferous stratigraphic units in Texas
- Paleontology in Texas
