= Wayland Formation =

Geologic formation in Texas, United States

- Type: Formation

Location
- Region: Texas
- Country: United States

The Wayland Formation is a geologic formation in Texas. It preserves fossils.

== See also ==
- List of fossiliferous stratigraphic units in Texas
- Paleontology in Texas
