= Tule Formation =

Geological formation in Texas

- Type: Formation

Location
- Region: Texas
- Country: United States

The Tule Formation is a geologic formation in Texas. It preserves fossils.

== See also ==
- List of fossiliferous stratigraphic units in Texas
- Paleontology in Texas
