= San Angelo Group =

Texan Paleontological Group

- Stratigraphic range: Permian
- Type: Group

Location
- Region: Texas
- Country: United States

The San Angelo Group is a geologic group in Texas. It preserves fossils dating back to the Permian period.

== See also ==
- List of fossiliferous stratigraphic units in Texas
- Paleontology in Texas
