= Corsicana Marl =

Geologic formation in Texas, United States

- Stratigraphic range: Cretaceous
- Type: Formation
- Unit of: Navarro Group

Location
- Region: Texas
- Country: United States

The Corsicana Marl is a geologic formation in Texas. It preserves fossils dating back to the Cretaceous period. It is primarily consisted of clay and mud, while a secondary rock type being sandstone.

== See also ==
- List of fossiliferous stratigraphic units in Texas
- Paleontology in Texas
