= Gaptank Formation =

Geologic formation in Texas, United States

- Stratigraphic range: Carboniferous
- Type: Formation
- Overlies: Haymond Formation

Location
- Region: Texas
- Country: United States

The Gaptank Formation is a geologic formation in Texas. It preserves fossils dating back to the Carboniferous period.

== See also ==
- List of fossiliferous stratigraphic units in Texas
- Paleontology in Texas
