= Lone Camp Group =

- Stratigraphic range: Carboniferous
- Type: Group

Location
- Region: Texas
- Country: United States

The Lone Camp Group is a geologic group in Texas. It preserves fossils dating back to the Carboniferous period.

== See also ==
- List of fossiliferous stratigraphic units in Texas
- Paleontology in Texas
