= Hogeye Tuff =

- Stratigraphic range: Paleogene
- Type: Group

Location
- Region: Texas
- Country: United States

The Hogeye Tuff is a geologic group in Texas. It preserves fossils dating back to the Paleogene period.

== See also ==
- List of fossiliferous stratigraphic units in Texas
- Paleontology in Texas
