= Walnut Formation =

Geologic formation in Texas, United States

- Stratigraphic range: Cretaceous
- Type: Formation

Location
- Region: Texas, Oklahoma
- Country: United States

The Walnut Formation is a geologic formation from the Albian Stage stretching from central Texas to southern Oklahoma. It is part of the Fredericksburg Group. The formation preserves fossils dating back to the Cretaceous period, notably marine invertebrates Exogyra texana, Gryphaea marcoui, and Carseyella walnutensis.

== See also ==
- List of fossiliferous stratigraphic units in Texas
- Paleontology in Texas
