= Moore Hollow Group =

Geologic group in Texas, United States

- Stratigraphic range: Cambrian
- Type: Group
- Sub-units: Hickory Sandstone, Cap Mountain Limestone, Lion Mountain Sandstone, Wilberns Formation

Lithology
- Primary: sandstone, limestone
- Other: dolomite

Location
- Region: Texas, Llano Uplift
- Country: United States

The Moore Hollow Group is a geologic group in Texas. It preserves fossils dating back to the Cambrian period.

== See also ==
- List of fossiliferous stratigraphic units in Texas
- Paleontology in Texas
