= Escondido Formation =

Geologic formation in Texas, United States

- Stratigraphic range: Late Cretaceous, 70.6–66.043 Ma
- Type: Formation
- Unit of: Navarro Group

Location
- Region: Texas & Coahuila
- Country: Mexico & United States

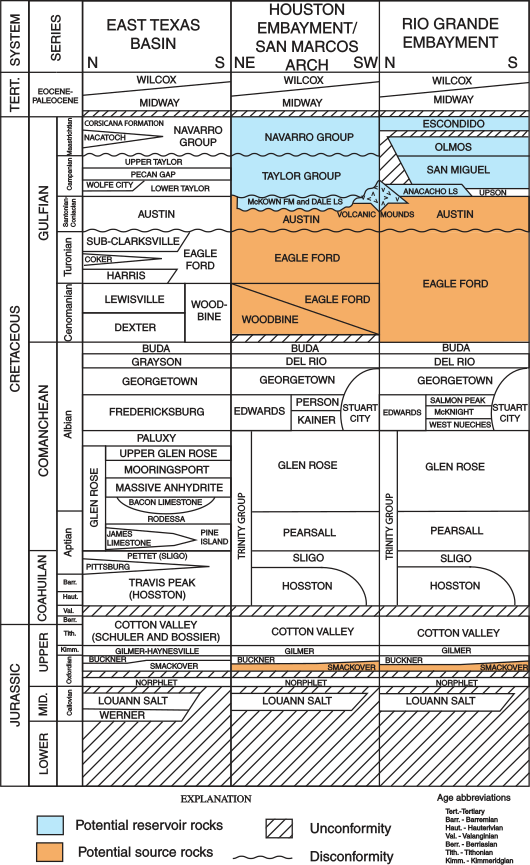
Escondido Formation stratigraphic column in Texas

The Escondido Formation is a geologic formation in Texas and Coahuila, Mexico. It preserves fossils dating back to the Late Cretaceous period. These fossils include ammonites, dyrosaurs like Sabinosuchus, crustaceans and corals.

== See also ==
- List of fossiliferous stratigraphic units in Texas
- Paleontology in Texas
