= Bend Group =

- Stratigraphic range: Carboniferous
- Type: Group
- Sub-units: Marble Falls Formation

Location
- Region: Texas
- Country: United States

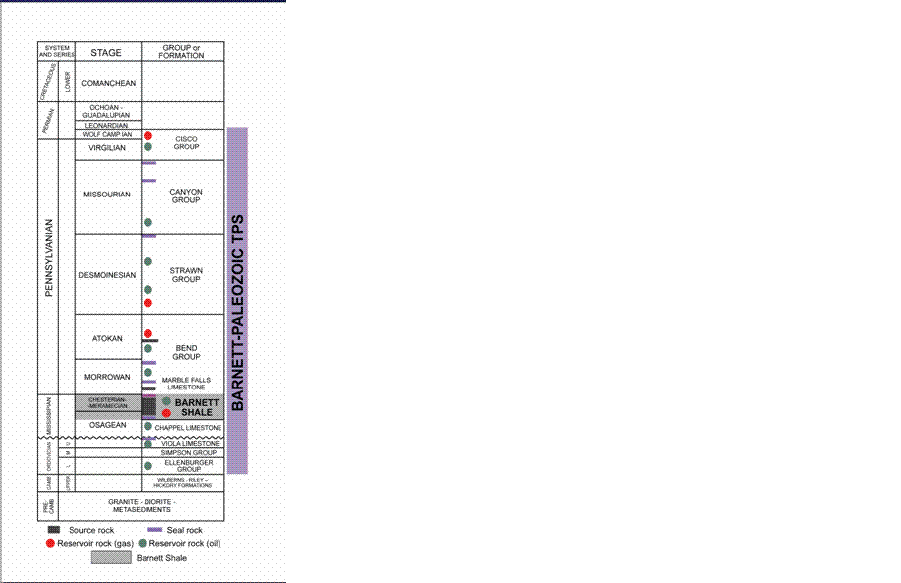
Bend Group - stratigraphy

The Bend Group is a geologic group in Texas. It preserves fossils dating back to the Carboniferous period.

== See also ==
- List of fossiliferous stratigraphic units in Texas
- Paleontology in Texas
