= Sligo Formation =

Geologic formation in Texas, United States

- Stratigraphic range: Cretaceous
- Type: Formation
- Underlies: Pearsall Formation
- Overlies: Hosston Formation

Location
- Region: Texas
- Country: United States

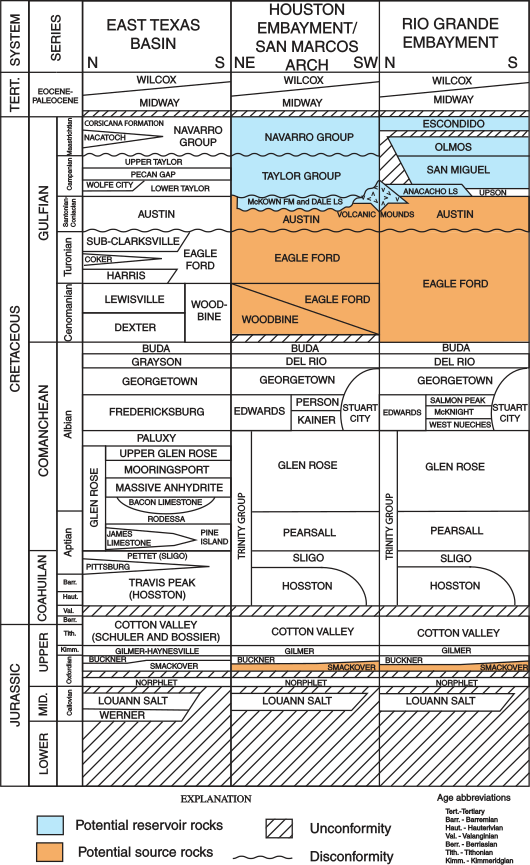
Sligo Formation stratigraphic column in Texas

The Sligo Formation is a geologic formation in Texas. It preserves fossils dating back to the Cretaceous period.

== See also ==
- List of fossiliferous stratigraphic units in Texas
- Paleontology in Texas
