= Thrifty Formation =

- Type: Formation

Location
- Region: Texas
- Country: United States

The Thrifty Formation is a geologic formation in Texas. It preserves fossils.

== See also ==
- List of fossiliferous stratigraphic units in Texas
- Paleontology in Texas
