= Goodland Limestone =

Geologic formation in Arkansas and Texas

- Stratigraphic range: Cretaceous
- Type: Formation
- Underlies: Kiamichi Shale
- Overlies: Trinity Group

Lithology
- Primary: Limestone

Location
- Region: Arkansas, Texas
- Country: United States

Type section
- Named for: Goodland, Choctaw County, Oklahoma
- Named by: Robert Thomas Hill

The Goodland Limestone or Goodland Formation is a geologic formation in Arkansas and Texas. It preserves fossils dating back to the Cretaceous period.

== See also ==
- List of fossiliferous stratigraphic units in Texas
- Paleontology in Texas
