= Lake Waco Formation =

Geologic formation in Texas

- Stratigraphic range: Mid Cenomanian-Early Turonian; ~96–93.5 Ma
- Type: Geological formation
- Unit of: Eagle Ford Group
- Sub-units: Bluebonnet Member, Cloice Member, Bouldin Member
- Underlies: South Bosque Formation
- Overlies: Pepper Shale

Lithology
- Primary: Shale
- Other: Marl, limestone, volcanic ash beds

Location
- Region: East Texas
- Country: United States

Type section
- Named for: Lake Waco near Waco, Texas
- Named by: Adkins and Lozo

The Lake Waco Formation is a geologic formation within the Eagle Ford Group deposited during the Middle Cenomanian to the Early Turonian of the Late Cretaceous in central Texas. The formation was named for outcrops near Lake Waco, south of the city of Waco, Texas by W. S. Adkins and F. E. Lozo in 1951. The Lake Waco Formation is primarily composed of shale, with minor amounts of limestone and volcanic ash beds (bentonites). It is subdivided into three members: Bluebonnet Member, Cloice Member, and the Bouldin Member. The Bluebonnet Member is 10 to 20 ft (3 to 6 m) thick, and is made up of broken pieces (prisms) of inoceramid clams and planktonic foraminifera. The Cloice Member is 35 ft (11 m) thick at its type section on the Cloice Branch of the South Bosque River, whereas the Bouldin Member was named for outcrops on Bouldin Creek south of downtown Austin, where it is roughly 9 ft (3 m) thick. They are both made up of shales rich in organic matter with thin limestones and volcanic ash beds.

Plesiosaur remains, shark's teeth, ammonites, and inoceramid clams are among the fossils that have been recovered from its strata.

== See also ==
- Plesiosaur stratigraphic distribution
