= Chafin =

Chafin is a surname. Notable people with the surname include:

- Andrew Chafin (born 1990), American Major League Baseball pitcher
- Ben Chafin (1960–2021), American politician and lawyer
- Don Chafin (1887–1954), American sheriff and a commander in the 1921 Battle of Blair Mountain
- Eugene W. Chafin (1852–1920), appointed to the bar of the Supreme Court of the United States and the Prohibition Party candidate for President of the US in the 1908 and 1912 elections
- Truman Chafin (born 1945), former member of the West Virginia Senate

== See also ==
- Chaffin
