= Cathedral Mountain Formation =

Geologic formation in Texas, United States

- Stratigraphic range: Permian
- Type: Formation

Location
- Location: Brewster County, Texas
- Coordinates: 30.308°N 103.266°W
- Region: Trans-Pecos
- Country: United States

Type section
- Location: Cathedral Mountain
- Coordinates: 30.31666°N 103.35000°W

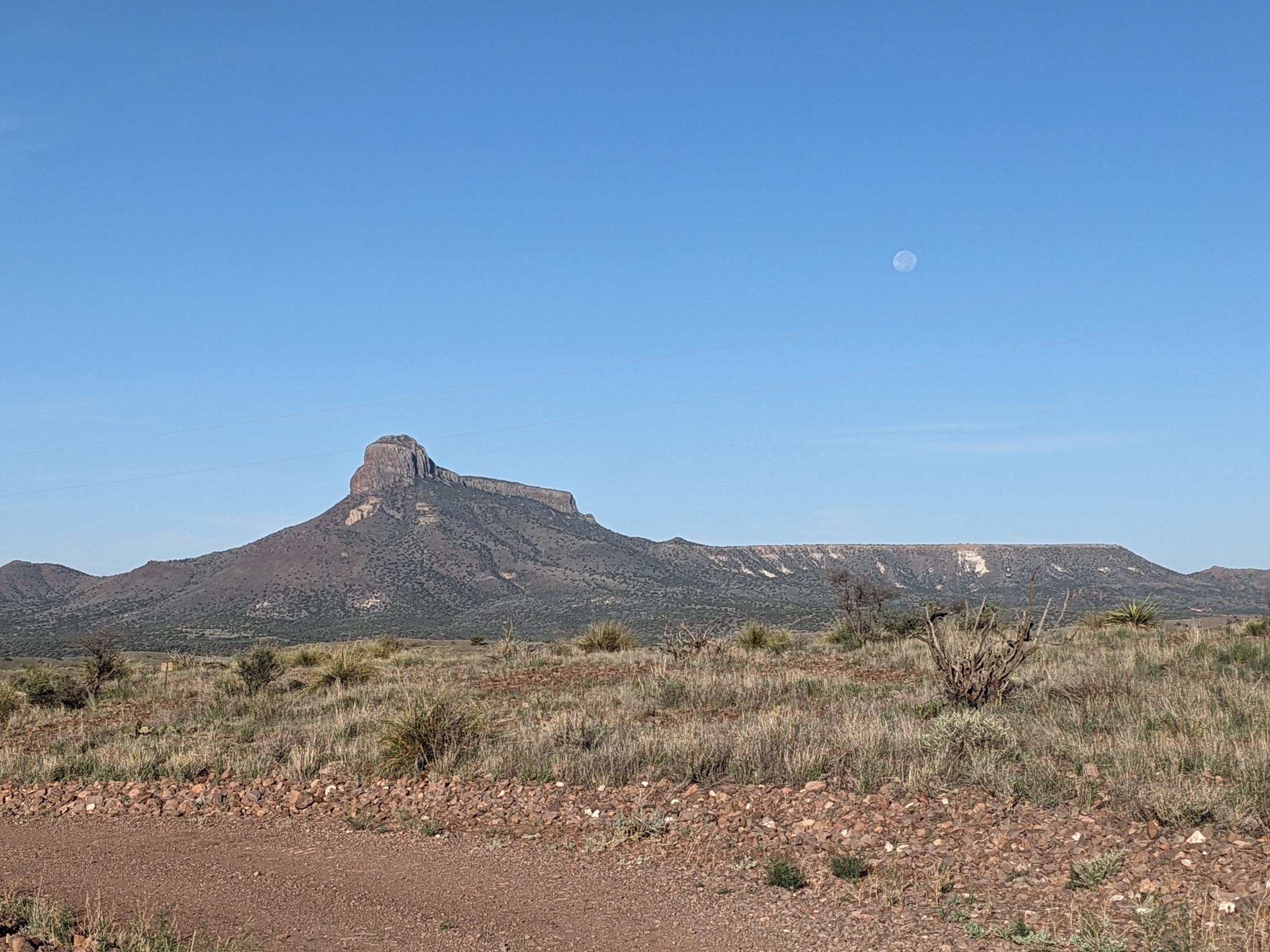

The Cathedral Mountain Formation is a geologic formation in Texas. It preserves fossils dating back to the Permian period.

== See also ==
- Geology of Texas
- List of fossiliferous stratigraphic units in Texas
- Paleontology in Texas
- Philip Burke King

== Stratigraphy of Cathedral Mountain Formation ==
- King, Philip Burke (October 8, 1930). "The Geology of the Glass Mountains, Texas" [The University of Texas Bulletins No. 3038, No. 3042: Descriptive Geology Part I & II] (PDF). Texas Scholar Works ~ University of Texas Libraries. The University of Texas at Austin. OCLC 3675439.
- McAnulty, William N. (May 1955). "Geology of Cathedral Mountain Quadrangle, Brewster County, Texas" [Bulletin of the Geological Society of America 1955-05: Vol. 66, Iss. 5]. Internet Archive. Geological Society of America. pp. 531–578.
- Cooper, G. Arthur; Grant, Richard E. (1966). "Permian Rock Units in the Glass Mountains West Texas" [Contributions to Stratigraphy: Geological Survey Bulletin 1244-E] (PDF). United States Geological Survey. United States Government Printing Office. doi:10.3133/b1244E.
- Keroher, Grace C. (1970). "Cathedral Mountain Formation" [Lexicon of Geologic Names of the United States for 1961-1967: Geological Survey Bulletin 1350] (PDF). United States Geological Survey. United States Government Printing Office. p. 129. doi:10.3133/b1350.
- "Permian Rock Units in the Glass Mountains, West Texas". National Geologic Map Database. United States Geological Survey.
