= Camp Creek Formation =

Geologic formation in Texas, United States

- Stratigraphic range: Permian
- Type: Formation

Location
- Region: Texas
- Country: United States

The Camp Creek Formation is a Permian geologic formation exposed in the U.S. state of Texas. It forms part of the Permian stratigraphic succession of the region and preserves fossil material that contributes to understanding the paleoenvironmental conditions of Texas during the Permian Period.

== Geology ==
The Camp Creek Formation consists of sedimentary strata deposited during the Permian Period. Regional studies of Permian formations in Texas indicate deposition in environments ranging from terrestrial to shallow marine settings.

Further stratigraphic analysis is required to clarify the formation's precise lithology, thickness, and stratigraphic relationships within the Permian basin sequence of Texas.

== Paleontology ==
Fossils recovered from the Camp Creek Formation have been catalogued in the Paleobiology Database. These occurrences contribute to regional biostratigraphic correlation of Permian units in Texas. Specific fossil assemblages should be documented based on published paleontological surveys.

== See also ==
- List of fossiliferous stratigraphic units in Texas
- Permian geology of Texas
