= Anahuac (automobile) =

United States automobile

Overview
- Manufacturer: Frontenac Motor Corporation
- Production: 1922
- Assembly: United States: Indianapolis

Dimensions
- Wheelbase: 115 in (2,900 mm)

The Anahuac was a short-lived United States automobile styled after a contemporary Polish car and manufactured in 1922 in Indianapolis by the Frontenac Motor Corporation Intended for the export market (it was to have been marketed in Mexico by a Mexican concern), the car had a wheelbase of 115 inches (2,900 mm); only four were ever completed.
