= Fredericksburg Group =

- Stratigraphic range: Cretaceous
- Type: Group
- Sub-units: Kiamichi Shale

Location
- Region: Texas
- Country: United States

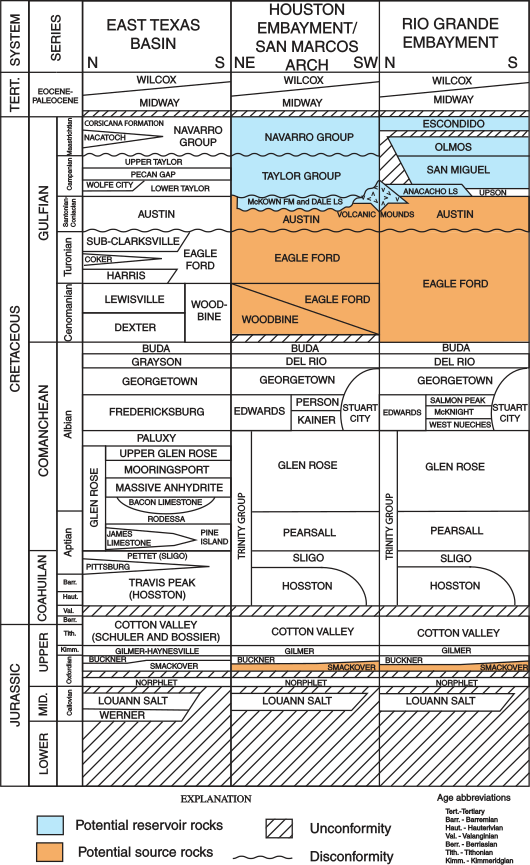
Fredericksburg Group stratigraphic column in Texas

The Fredericksburg Group is a geologic group in Texas, United States. It preserves fossils dating back to the Cretaceous period.

== See also ==
- List of fossiliferous stratigraphic units in Texas
- Paleontology in Texas
