= Navarro Group =

Geological Group in North America

- Stratigraphic range: Late Cretaceous, Maastrichtian
- Type: Group
- Sub-units: Escondido Formation

Location
- Region: Arkansas, Texas and Coahuila
- Country: United States and Mexico

Type section
- Named for: Navarro County, Texas
- Named by: Benjamin Franklin Shumard

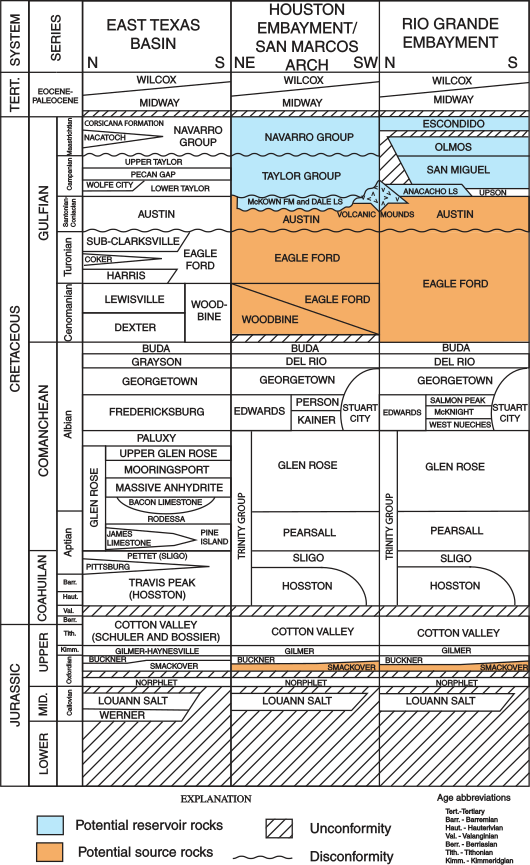
Navarro Group stratigraphic column in Texas

The Navarro Group is a geologic group in Arkansas, Texas and Coahuila, Mexico. It preserves fossils dating back to the Cretaceous period.

== See also ==
- List of fossiliferous stratigraphic units in Arkansas
- Paleontology in Arkansas
- List of fossiliferous stratigraphic units in Texas
- Paleontology in Texas
