= Tahoka Formation =

Geologic formation in Texas and New Mexico, US

- Stratigraphic range: late Pleistocene
- Type: Formation
- Unit of: Tule Group
- Thickness: 3 m (10 ft)

Lithology
- Primary: Mudstone
- Other: Conglomerate, gypsum

Location
- Coordinates: 33.164°N 101.794°W
- Region: Texas; New Mexico
- Country: United States

Type section
- Named for: Tahoka, Texas
- Named by: Evans and Meade
- Year defined: 1945
- Tahoka Formation (the United States) Tahoka Formation (Texas)

The Tahoka Formation is a geological formation in Texas and New Mexico, which was emplaced in now-dry lakes during late Pleistocene wet periods.

== Location and nature ==
A number of playa lakes occur on the Llano Estacado between Texas and New Mexico, they are the easternmost such lakes in the United States. These basins such as Double Lakes, Guthrie Lake, Tahoka Lake and Twin Lakes apparently formed through fluvial erosion during wet and wind erosion during dry periods.

The Tahoka Formation consists of lake sediments that cover most of these basins when not covered by younger lake and wind-transported sediments. It is well preserved in the larger playas but also occurs across thousands of small playa depressions in the Southern High Plains and as far as Nall Playa in Oklahoma. At Arch Lake in New Mexico, it may cover a surface of over 130 square kilometres (50 sq mi). At Illusion Lake, Lamb County, wind-driven deflation of Tahoka Formation deposits has formed a new lake basin.

It features clays deposited by river deltas and at shores but also muds deposited in the middle of lakes. The clays are accompanied by sand and are bentonitic; there is also gravel and gypsum. The mineral finchite (Sr(UO_{2})_{2}(V_{2}O_{8})·(H_{2}O)_{5}) was discovered in the Tahoka Formation. The Tahoka Formation was emplaced in perennial lakes. Limestones, later determined to be dolomite, have been used to correlate it across lake basins. The deposits are usually thin; at Tahoka Lake they reach thicknesses of 3 meters (10 ft). At at least one site, they are mined for gravel. The Tahoka Formation rocks appear to be derived from Cretaceous shales that were redeposited. After deposition, the Tahoka Formation rocks were tilted by differential subsidence.

== History of investigation ==
Initially, a "Tahoka clay" was defined in 1945 by G.L. Evans and G.E. Meade as clay deposits in former lakes, and named after Tahoka, Texas which is close to several of the lakes studied. A reference section was defined at Rich Lake, Lynn County. Reeves proposed in 1976 that the layer underlying the dolomite be redefined as the "Double Lake Formation", but the proposal was not accepted by Hall 2001.

== Correlations ==
The Tahoka Formation has been correlated to the Gamerco Formation in Gallup, New Mexico, the Jeddito Formation in the Hopi Reservation of Arizona, and the Neville Formation in the Big Bend Region, Texas. The "High Terrace" in the Plains is also correlative to the Tahoka Formation. A mudstone found in a pit at Blackwater Draw, Clovis, New Mexico, has also been related to the Tahoka Formation. Together with older formations it constitutes the Tule Group, which consists in sediments deposited within basins.

== Geochronology ==
The original research into the Tahoka clay suggested that it was deposited at the time of the Wisconsin glaciation, a finding later supported by radiocarbon dating. At the time, pluvial lakes such as Lake Estancia in present-day New Mexico reached highstands across the American Southwest, and a wetter climate with increased runoff is also recorded from west of the Llano Estacado. The Cary, Tazewell or Woodfordian glacial advances may be correlated to the Tahoka Formation.

== Environmental conditions at deposition ==
During the Pleistocene until 12,000 radiocarbon years ago, the lakes on the Llano Estacado were filled with water and drained through creeks like Yellowhouse Draw towards the Caprock Escarpment to the southeast. Clay deposits accumulated in these lakes, which are the easternmost pluvial lakes in the United States. A brief lowstand may be responsible for the emplacement of the dolomite.

At the time of emplacement of the Tahoka Formation, the climate was colder and wetter than today as part of the "Tahoka Pluvial" and other moist episodes. The region was covered by sagebrush grassland like most of the American Southwest at the time. Pollen data were used to propose that at the time when the Tahoka Formation was emplaced, the region was covered with polar forests during two stages. This theory that the present-day prairies were forested drew a lot of attention but later research showed that the pollen data were artifacts.

There are fossil molluscs and vertebrates in the Tahoka deposits. Bison fossils have been found in the Tahoka clay, and camels, horses, glyptodons and mammoths lived during that time. In some places, bison bones form extensive beds such as at Silver Lake in Hockley County.
