= Washita Group =

- Stratigraphic range: Cretaceous
- Type: Group
- Sub-units: Paw Paw Formation

Location
- Region: Texas
- Country: United States

The Washita Group is a geologic group in Texas. It preserves fossils dating back to the Cretaceous period.

== See also ==
- List of fossiliferous stratigraphic units in Texas
- Paleontology in Texas
