= Malone Formation =

Geologic formation in Texas, United States

- Stratigraphic range: Kimmeridgian-Tithonian; ~153–149 Ma
- Type: Geological formation
- Sub-units: Upper member; Lower member
- Underlies: Torcer Formation
- Overlies: Briggs Formation
- Thickness: 45 meters (east side); 325 meters (northwest part of Malone Mountains)

Lithology
- Primary: Siliclastic strata & limestone

Location
- Region: Texas
- Country: United States

Type section
- Named for: Malone Mountains

The Malone Formation is a geologic formation in Texas. It preserves fossils dating back to the Jurassic period.

== Description ==
One of the few geological formations in Texas dating to the Jurassic period, the Malone Formation unconformably overlies the Permian Briggs Formation, and laterally changes thickness dramatically from 45 meters on the east side to 325 meters in the northwest part of the Malone Mountains. It has been split into two subdivisions: a lower member containing Idoceras suggesting a Kimmeridgian age, and an upper member containing Kossmatia indicating a Tithonian age. Geochronological analysis of detrital zircon suggests an age of 151±2 Ma for the formation, supporting its dating to the late Jurassic.

=== Depositional environment ===
The Malone Formation represents a fan-delta system in a shallow marine to marginal marine environment, deposited along the northern edge of the Chihuahua trough (a sedimentary basin mostly located in northeast Mexico). Many fossils found in the formation represent marine invertebrates.

== Fossil content ==
Color key: Taxon / Reclassified taxon / Taxon falsely reported as present / Dubious taxon or junior synonym / Ichnotaxon / Ootaxon / Morphotaxon	Notes; Uncertain or tentative taxa are in small text; ~~crossed out~~ taxa are discredited.

=== Vertebrates ===
Remains of vertebrates in this formation are rare and mostly poorly-preserved. Two cycloid fish scales, a pycnodont tooth and bone fragments of 'enaliosaurs' (a classification now obsolete) have been reported from the Malone Formation, but are not well-described.

Vertebrates reported from the Malone Formation
Genus	Species	Presence	Material	Notes	Images
cf. Plesiosauria		Northwest Malone Mountains (Jackson Ranch area).	Propodial (TMM 47259–1).	A small, possibly juvenile plesiosaur.	
cf. Pliosauridae		Northwest Malone Mountains (Jackson Ranch area).	Vertebra (TMM 44038–1).	A pliosaur.	

=== Invertebrates ===
==== Annelids ====
Annelids reported from the Malone Formation
Genus	Species	Presence	Material	Notes	Images
Serpula	S. gordialis	1.5 miles east of Malone station.	Numerous specimens.	A tube worm.	
Serpula	S. sp.	1.5 miles east of Malone station.	Multiple specimens.	Larger than S. gordialis.	
Serpula	S. sp.	1.5 miles east of Malone station.	1 specimen now lost.	Distinct from the other Serpula of the formation.	

==== Bivalves ====
Bivalves reported from the Malone Formation
Genus	Species	Presence	Material	Notes	Images
Anatina	A. obliquiplicata	1.5 miles east of Malone station.	8 specimens.	A duck clam.	
Anatina	A.? pliculifera	1.5 miles east of Malone station.	1 specimen.	A duck clam.	
Arca	A.? dumbli	1.5 miles east of Malone station.	5 specimens.	An ark clam.	
Arca	A. taffii	1.5 miles east of Malone station.	1 specimen.	An ark clam.	
Astarte	A. breviacola	1.5 miles east of Malone station.	Numerous specimens.	An astartid.	
Astarte	A.? craticula	1.5 miles east of Malone station.	1 specimen.	An astartid.	
Astarte	A.? isodontoides	1.5 miles east of Malone station.	1 specimen.	An astartid.	
Astarte	A. malonensis	Various localities in & around Malone Mountain.	Numerous specimens.	An astartid.	
Astarte	A. posticalva	1.5 miles east of Malone station.	21 specimens.	An astartid.	
Corbula	C.? maloniana	West base of Malone Mountain.	Cast of a right valve.	A corbulid.	
Cucullaea	C. castilloi	Northwest end of Malone Mountain.	2 specimens.	A false ark shell.	
Cucullaea	C. catorcensis	East of Malone Mountain.	4 casts.	A false ark shell.	
Cucullaea	C.? texticostata	1.5 miles east of Malone station.	1 specimen & a fragment.	A false ark shell.	
Cucullaea	C. transpecosensis	1 mile northeast of Malone, El Paso County, Texas.	1 specimen.	A false ark shell.	
Craginella	C. goodellii	2.4 km east for Malone station.	18 specimens.	A megatrigoniid, originally reported as Trigonia goodelli.	
Cyprina	C. coteroi	1.5 miles east of Malone station.	4 (& 2 doubtful) specimens.		
Cyprina	C.? streeruvitzii	1.5 miles east of Malone station.	11 incomplete specimens.		
Exogyra	E. potosina	West of Malone Mountain.	6 specimens.	A gryphaeid.	
Exogyra	E. subplicifera	1.5 miles east of Malone station.	19 specimens.	A gryphaeid.	
Gervillia	G. cinderella	West base of Malone Mountain.	1 specimen.	A bakevelliid.	
Gervillia	G. corrugata	1.5 miles east of Malone station.	23 imperfect specimens & fragments.	A bakevelliid.	
Gervillia	G.? riograndensis	West base of Malone Mountain.	1 specimen.	A bakevelliid.	
Gryphaea	G. mexicana	Various localities in & around Malone Mountain.	Numerous specimens.	A gryphaeid.	
Leda	L.? navicula	East slope of Malone Mountain.	Cast of a left valve.		
Lima	L. interlineata	1.5 miles east of Malone station.	Valves & fragments.	A file shell.	
Lima	L. (Ctenostreon) riograndensis	1.5 miles east of Malone station.	1 specimen.	A file shell.	
Lucina	L.? emarginata	1.5 miles east of Malone station.	3 specimens.	A lucinid.	
Lucina	L. planiuscula	Northwest end of Malone Mountain.	4 shells & about a dozen casts.	A lucinid.	
Lucina	L. potosina	1.5 miles east of Malone station.	5 specimens.	A lucinid.	
Lucina	L. potosina var. metrica	Various localities in & around Malone Mountain.	Over 200 specimens.	A lucinid.	
Martesia	M. maloniana	Various localities in & around Malone Mountain.	Casts.	A piddock.	
Modiola	M. geniculata	1 mile east of Finlay station.	A left valve.	A mussel.	
Modiola	M. maloniana	Various localities in & around Malone Mountain.	4 specimens.	A mussel.	
Mytilus	M. nuntius	1.5 miles east of Malone station.	A well-preserved cast.	A mussel.	
Ostrea	O. sp.	1.5 miles east of Malone station.	3 imperfect valves.	A true oyster.	
Pecten	P. (Camptonectes) insutus	Various localities in & around Malone Mountain.	About 50 specimens.	A scallop.	
Pholadomya	P. marcoui	1.5 miles east of Malone station.	10 specimens.	A pholadomyid.	
Pholadomya	P. paucicosta	1.5 miles east of Malone station, & 2 miles east-southeast from Finlay station.	27 specimens.	A pholadomyid.	
Pholadomya	P. praeposita	1.5 miles east of Malone station.	4 specimens.	A pholadomyid.	
Pholadomya	P. tosta	1.5 miles east of Malone station.	25 specimens.	A pholadomyid.	
Pinna	P. quadrifrons	Various localities in & around Malone Mountain.	Numerous specimens.	A pen shell.	
Pleuromya	P. inconstans	Various localities in & around Malone Mountain.	Numerous specimens.		
Pleuromya	P. inconstans var. curta	Southern part of Malone Mountain & 1.5 miles east of Malone station.	Multiple specimens.		
Plicatula	P. sportella	1.5 miles east of Malone station.	1 specimen.	A plicatulid.	
Ptychomya	P. stantoni	1.5 miles east of Malone station.	23 specimens.	A crassatellid.	
Tapes	T.? cuneovatus	1.5 miles east of Malone station.	A right valve.	A venus clam.	
Thracia	T.? maloniana	1.5 miles east of Malone station.	6 specimens.	A thraciid.	
Trigonia	T. calderoni	1.5 miles east of Malone station, & a mile east of Finlay station.	11 specimens.	A trigoniid.	
Trigonia	T. conferticostata	1.5 miles east of Malone station.	A shell, 2 valves & fragments.	A trigoniid.	
Trigonia	T. goodellii	1.5 miles east of Malone station.	18 specimens.	Reassigned to Craginella.	
Trigonia	T. munita	West & east of Malone station.	3 imperfect specimens & several fragments.	A trigoniid.	
Trigonia	T. praestriata	East slope of Malone Mountain.	A mold.	A trigoniid.	
Trigonia	T. proscabra	1.5 miles east of Malone station.	About 35 specimens.	A trigoniid.	
Trigonia	T. rudicostata	1.5 miles east of Malone station.	2 specimens.	A trigoniid.	
Trigonia	T. vyschetzkii	1.5 miles east of Malone station.	Numerous specimens.	A trigoniid.	
Unicardium	U.? semirotundum	Various localities in & around Malone Mountain.	12 specimens.	A lucinid.	
Unicardium	U.? transversum	Various localities in & around Malone Mountain.	16 specimens.	A lucinid.	

==== Bryozoans ====
Bryozoans reported from the Malone Formation
Genus	Species	Presence	Material	Notes	Images
Berenicea	B. maloniana	1.5 miles east of Malone station.	Colonies.	A bereniceid.	

==== Cephalopods ====
Cephalopods reported from the Malone Formation
Genus	Species	Presence	Material	Notes	Images
Aspidoceras	A. alamitocensis	1.5 miles east of Malone station.	Portion of a shell.	An ammonite.	
Nautilus	N. burkarti	West side of the mountain southwest of Malone station.	An imperfect specimen.	A nautiloid.	
Nautilus	N. naufragus	Northwest end of Malone Mountain.	2 imperfect specimens.	A nautiloid.	
Olcostephanus	O. malonianus	1.5 miles east of Malone station.	A few parts of the whorls.	An ammonite.	
Oppelia	O.? fallax	1.5 miles east of Malone station.	Fragmentary specimens.	An ammonite.	
Perisphinctes	P. aguilerai	Foothills west of Malone Mountain.	7 fragments.	An ammonite.	
Perisphinctes	P. clarki	Various localities in & around Malone Mountain.	Multiple specimens.	An ammonite.	
Perisphinctes	P. felixi	1.5 miles east of Malone station.	2 specimens.	An ammonite.	
Perisphinctes	P. potosinus	1.5 miles east of Malone station.	Fragment.	An ammonite.	
Perisphinctes	P. schucherti	Various localities in & around Malone Mountain.	Multiple specimens.	An ammonite.	

==== Corals ====
Corals reported from the Malone Formation
Genus	Species	Presence	Material	Notes	Images
Astrocoenia	A. maloniana	1.5 miles east of Malone, Texas.	9 specimens.	An astrocoeniid.	

==== Echinoderms ====
Echinoderms reported from the Malone Formation
Genus	Species	Presence	Material	Notes	Images
Holectypus	H.? sp.	East slope of Malone Mountain.	A fragment.	A sea urchin.	
Pygurus	P. sp.	West side of Malone Mountain.	A fragment.	A sea urchin.	

==== Gastropods ====
Gastropods reported from the Malone Formation
Genus	Species	Presence	Material	Notes	Images
Acteonina	A.? maloniana	1.5 miles east of Malone station.	Cast bearing 2 fragments.	An acteonid.	
Cerithium	C. arcuiferum	1.5 miles east of Malone station.	1 specimen.	A cerith.	
Delphinula	D. stantoni	1.5 miles east of Malone station.	5 specimens.		
Natica	N. bilabiata	1.5 miles east of Malone station.	1 specimen.	A moon snail.	
Natica	N. finlayensis	Northwest end of Malone Mountain.	1 specimen.	A moon snail.	
Natica	N. inflecta	1.5 miles east of Malone station.	3 shells.	A moon snail.	
Natica	N. williamsi	1.5 miles east of Malone station.	Nearly 100 specimens.	A moon snail.	
Nerinea	N. circumvoluta	1.5 miles east of Malone station.	Several specimens.	A nerineid.	
Nerinea	N. goodellii	1.5 miles east of Malone station, & southern end of Malone Mountain.	Multiple specimens.	A nerineid.	
Nerinella	N. stantoni	Various localities in & around Malone Mountain.	Several specimens.	A nerinellid.	
Nerita	N. finlayensis	Northwest end of Malone Mountain.	1 specimen.	A nerite.	
Nerita	N. nodilirata	Lower strata.	54 specimens.	A nerite.	
Nerita	N. peroblata	1.5 miles east of Malone station.	1 specimen.	A nerite.	
Pleurotomaria	P. circumtrunca	1.5 miles east of Malone station.	11 specimens.	A pleurotomariid.	
Pseudomelania	P. goodellii	Various localities in & around Malone Mountain.	Multiple specimens.	A pseudomelaniid.	
Turbo	T.? beneclathratus	1.5 miles east of Malone station.	1 specimen.	A turban snail.	
Turritella	T. burkarti	East slope of Malone Mountain.	1 specimen.	A turritellid.	
Vermetus	V. cornejoi	1.5 miles east of Malone station.	8 specimens.	A worm shell.	

=== Plants ===
Fossil remains of plants, including driftwood, are abundant in the Malone Formation, but not well preserved.

== See also ==
- List of fossiliferous stratigraphic units in Texas
- Paleontology in Texas
