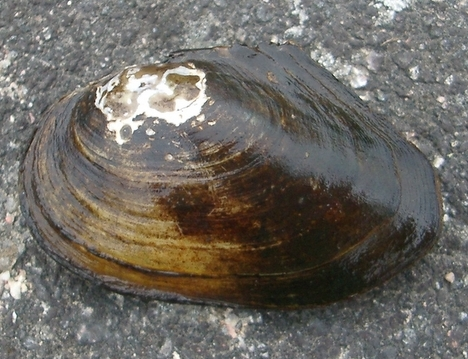
- A live individual of Anodonta anatina, the duck mussel

Scientific classification
- Kingdom: Animalia
- Phylum: Mollusca
- Class: Bivalvia
- Subterclass: Palaeoheterodonta
- Order: Unionida; Stoliczka, 1871

Families
- See text

= Unionida =

Unionida Temporal range: Triassic–Present

Order of bivalves

Unionida is a monophyletic order of freshwater mussels, aquatic bivalve molluscs. The order includes most of the larger freshwater mussels, including the freshwater pearl mussels. The most common families are the Unionidae and the Margaritiferidae. All have in common a larval stage that is temporarily parasitic on fish, nacreous shells, high in organic matter, that may crack upon drying out, and siphons too short to permit the animal to live deeply buried in sediment.

== Morphology ==
The shells of these mussels are variable in shape, but usually equivalve and elongate. They have solid, nacreous valves with a pearly interior, radial sculpture, and an entire pallial line.

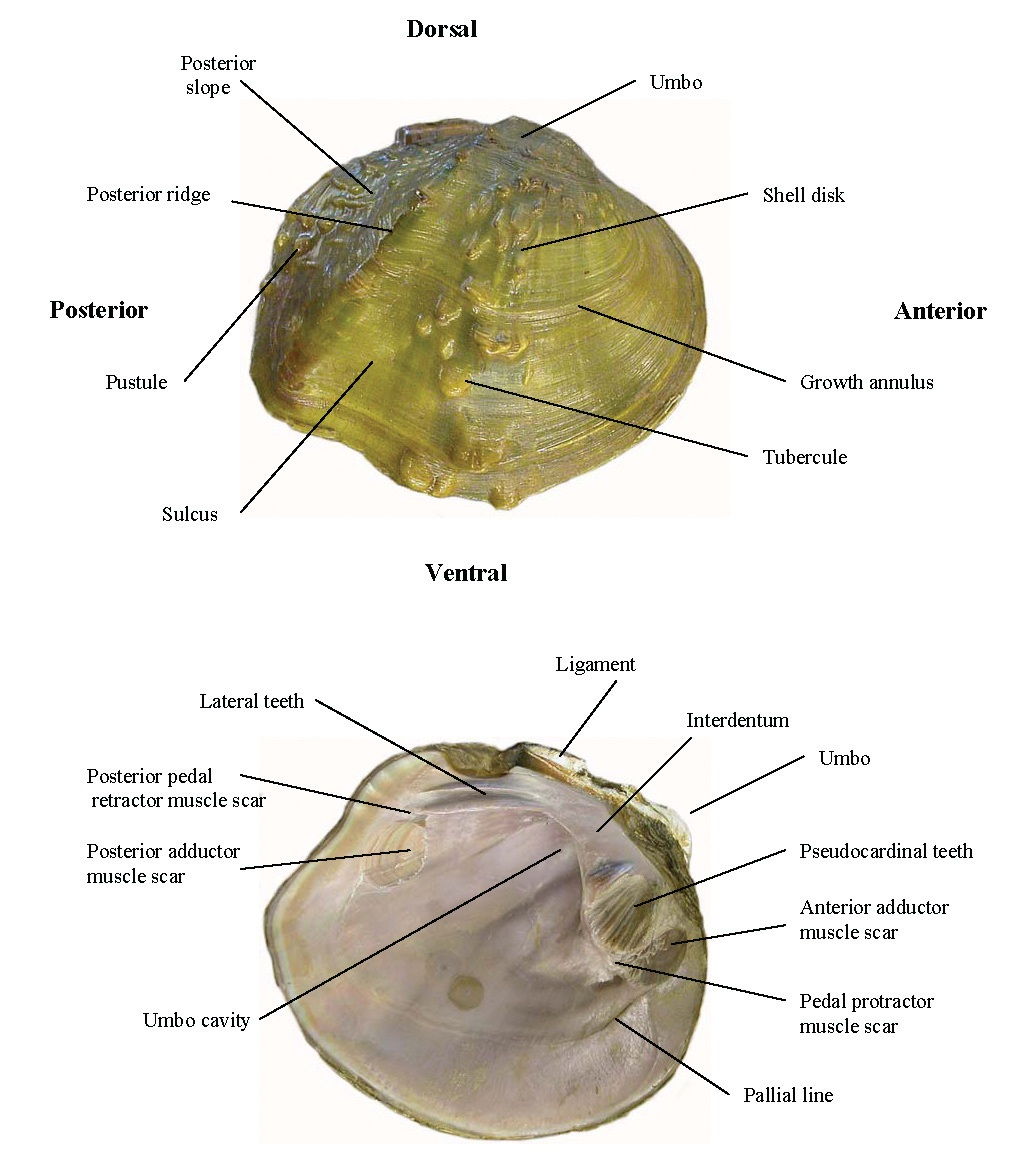
Freshwater mussel showing glossary of terms.

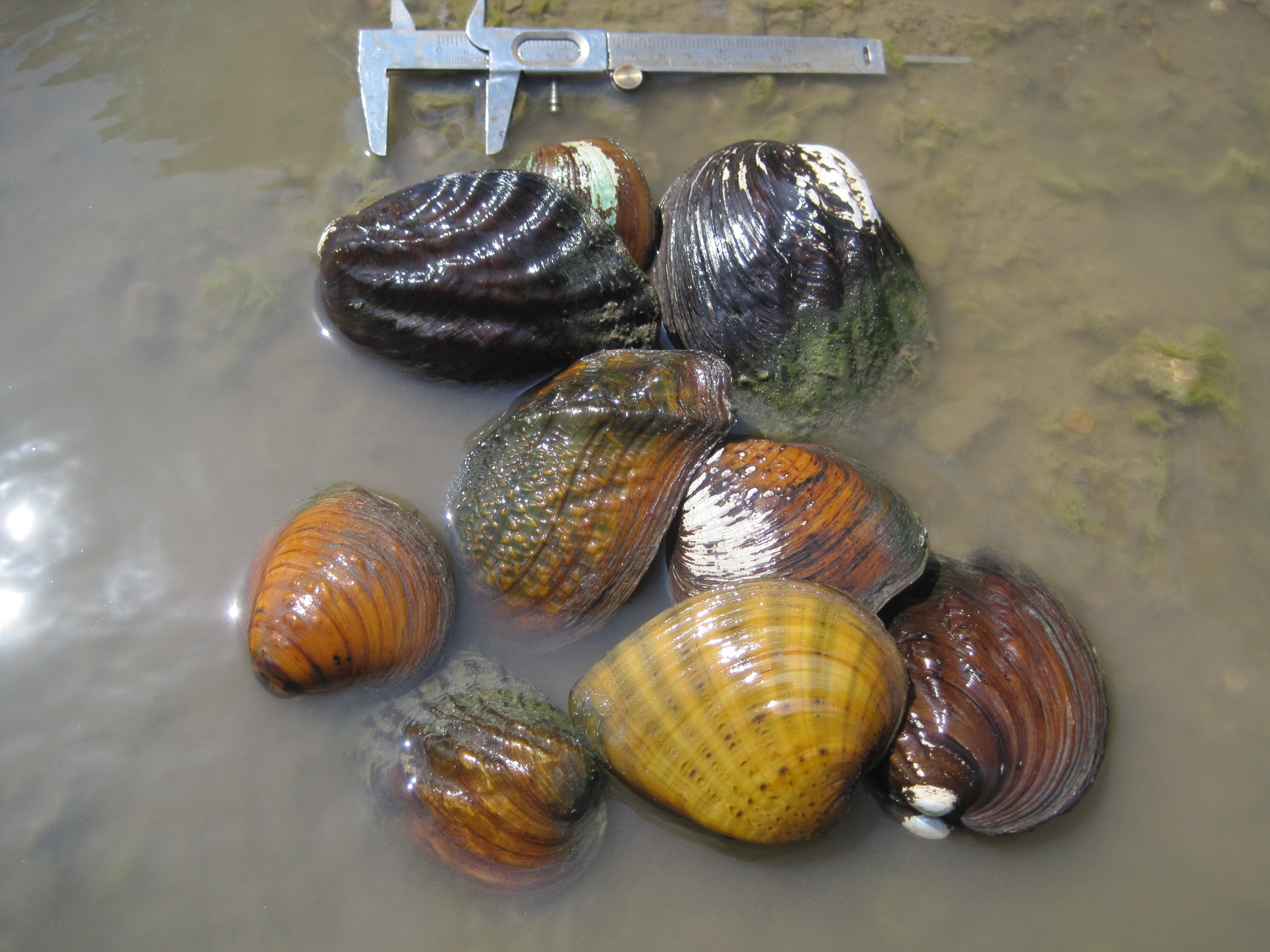
Several species of freshwater pearl mussels collected in a river during a survey of the Marais des Cygnes National Wildlife Refuge.

== Evolutionary history ==
Although some fossil freshwater bivalves from the Carboniferous and Permian periods have been suggested to be unionids, other authors have suggested that they are likely to be unrelated, due to lacking the internal nacreous layer thought to have been present in the last common ancestor of all unionids and present in their closest marine relatives, the Trigoniida. The oldest unambiguous unionids are known from the Triassic period, with the oldest commonly cited examples being from the Late Triassic Chinle Formation and Newark Supergroup of North America, though possibly older examples are known from the Middle Triassic of Tanzania and Zambia.

== Distribution ==
Families, genera, and species in the order Unionida are found on six continents, where they are restricted exclusively to freshwater rivers, streams, creeks and some lakes. There are approximately 900 species worldwide. Around 300 species of these freshwater mussels are endemic to North America. Unlike other bivalve orders, Unionida has no marine species, although one species (Glebula rotundata) tolerates brackish water. This widespread trait and its global distribution suggests the group has inhabited freshwater throughout its geologic history.

== Life habits ==
Unionida burrow into the substrate in clean, fast flowing freshwater rivers, streams and creeks, with their posterior margins exposed. They pump water through the incurrent aperture, obtaining oxygen and filtering food from the water column. Freshwater mussels are some of the longest-living invertebrates in existence. These clams have, like all bivalve mollusks, a shell consisting of two parts that are hinged together, which can be closed to protect the animal's soft body within. Like all mollusks, the freshwater mussels have a muscular "foot", which enables the mussel to move slowly and bury itself within the bottom substrate of its freshwater habitat.

== Reproduction ==
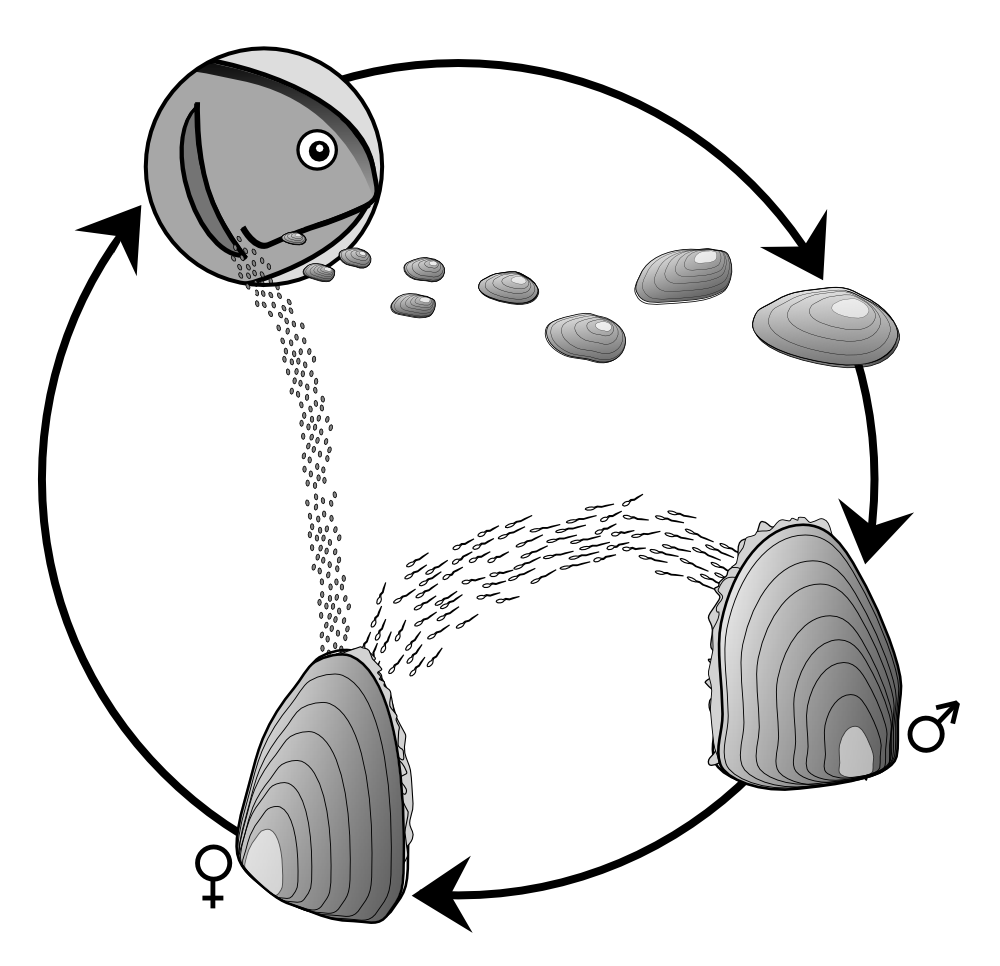
Unionida parasitic life cycle

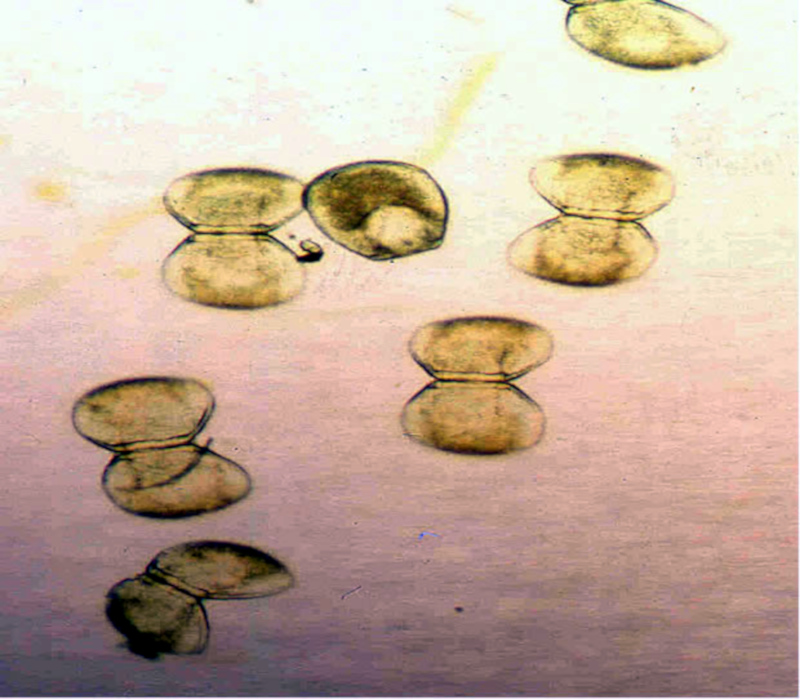
Glochidia of the mussel Lampsilis higginsii

Unionida have a unique and complex life cycle involving parasitic larvae. This larval form used to be described as "parasitic worms" on the fish host, however, the larvae are not "worms" and do not harm fish under normal circumstances. Most of these freshwater mussel species have separate sexes (although some species, such as Elliptio complanata, are known to be hermaphroditic). The sperm is ejected from the mantle cavity through the male's excurrent aperture and taken into the female's mantle cavity through the incurrent aperture. Fertilised eggs move from the gonads to the gills (marsupia) where they further ripen and metamorph into glochidia, the first larval stage. Mature glochidia are released by the female and then attach to the gills, fins or skin of a host fish. Typically, the freshwater mussel larvae (glochidia) have hooks, which enable the individual to attach itself to fish. Some freshwater mussels release their glochidia in mucilaginous packets called conglutinates. The conglutinate has a sticky filament that allows it to adhere to the substrate so it is not washed away. There is also an even more specialized way of dispersal known as a super-conglutinate. The super-conglutinate resembles an aquatic fly larva or a fish egg, complete with a dark area that looks like an eyespot, and it is appetizing to fish. When a fish consumes it, it breaks up, releasing the glochidia. Mussels that produce conglutinates and super-conglutinates are often gill parasites, the glochidia attaching to the fish gills to continue their development into juveniles. A cyst is quickly formed around the glochidia, and they stay on the fish for several weeks or months before they fall off as juvenile freshwater mussels which then bury themselves in the sediment. This unique life cycle allows Unionida freshwater mussels to move upstream with the fish host species.

== Conservation issues and endangered species status ==
Many of these freshwater mussel species face conservation issues due to habitat degradation and in some cases due to over-exploitation for the freshwater pearl industry, and for the nacre of their shells, which was used in button manufacturing. Of the North American Unionida about 70% are either extinct (21 species), endangered (77 species), threatened (43 species) or are listed as species of special concern (72 species).

== Commercial significance ==
These bivalve mollusks were heavily exploited for freshwater pearls, and for their nacre which was used in the button manufacturing industry in the late 19th and early 20th centuries. The effects of heavy fishing for freshwater mussels in North America in for use in manufacturing buttons put many of these species close to extinction.

=== Freshwater pearl industry ===
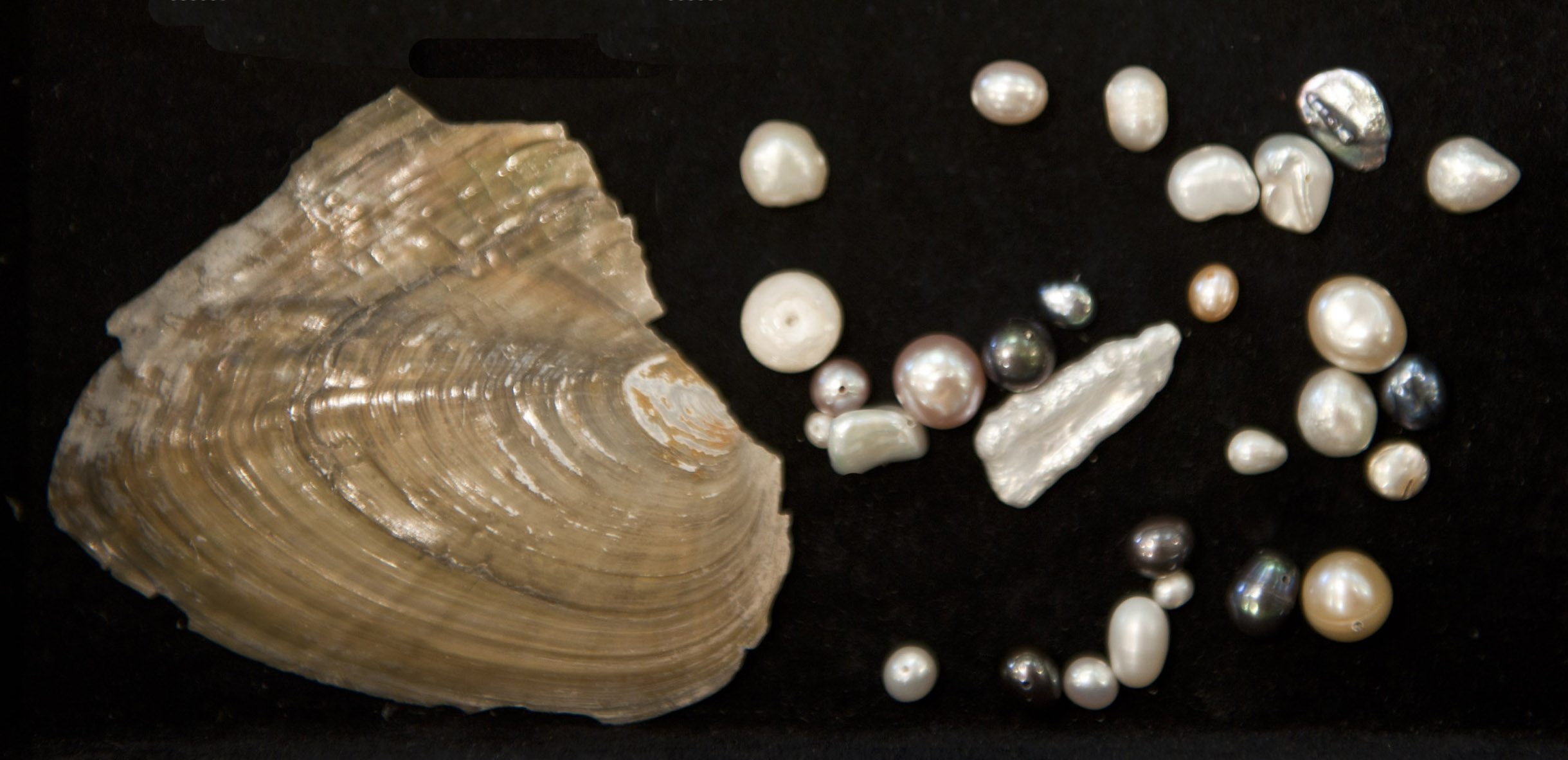
Shell of one species of freshwater pearl mussel, possible Lasmigona complanata (commonly known as the white heelsplitter), with pearls.

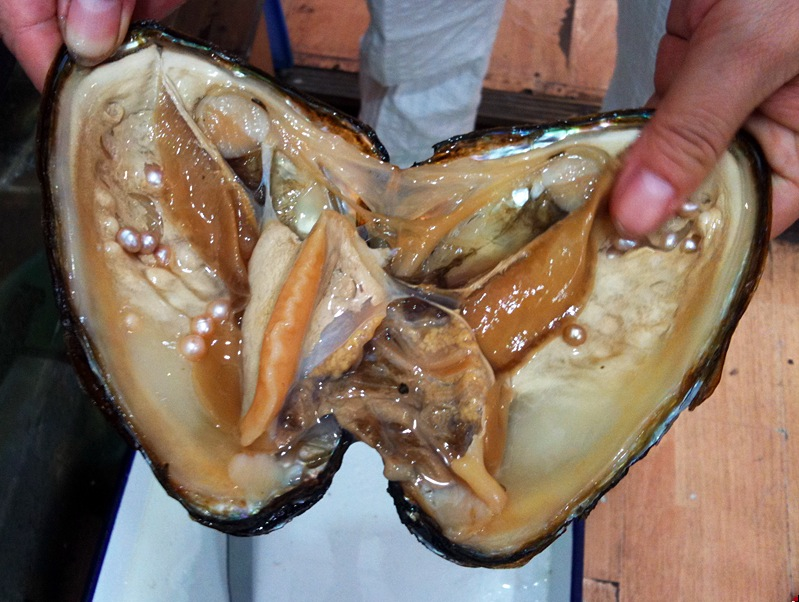
A newly opened Hyriopsis cumingi, freshwater mussel, showing the rows of cultured pearls inside.

The "pearl rush" in North America occurred in the mid to late 1800s as people could easily find freshwater mussels in rivers and streams by "pollywogging" for mussels, some of which had freshwater pearls which they could sell for a significant price. The art of "pollywogging" involves shuffling one's feet in the mud feeling around for freshwater mussels. Because this was relatively easy to do, and an easy way to make money from freshwater selling pearls, this period has been euphemistically called the "pearl rush", and some historians have compared it to the gold rush in California. A formal freshwater mussel fishing industry was established in the mid-1850s to take advantage of this natural resource. The "pearl rush" to find freshwater pearls became so intense in some rivers that millions of freshwater mussels were killed in a few years. In some rivers and streams entire freshwater mussel beds were completely eliminated. Although the negative impact of the "pearl rush" on freshwater mussel populations was significant, it was relatively minor compared to the over fishing that took place just a few years later with the "pearl" button industry.

Freshwater pearls from North America come from freshwater mussels primarily in the family Unionidae. About 20 different species of Unionidae are commercially harvested for pearls. The common names of the most prolific pearl-bearing species include: the butterfly, ebony, elephant ear, heelsplitter, mapleleaf, three-ridge pigtoe, pimple back, pistol grip, and washboard. While white is the most common color, freshwater pearls are valued in part for their wide range of lustrous colors, including: blue, bronze, brown, copper, cream, green, lavender, pink, purple, red, salmon, silvery white, white, and yellow. The different colors of freshwater pearls are primarily a function of which species of freshwater mussel they were formed in, although various factors including position of the pearl nucleus in the shell, water quality, and species type all affect the color of the freshwater pearl.

With the decline in the numbers of native freshwater mussels in North America people began to culture freshwater pearls; this became a big industry in Japan. Natural freshwater pearls are rarely perfectly round, more often than not freshwater pearls are naturally shaped as baroque, slug, or wing shaped. Round pearls are sought after as more desirable for use in jewelry. The shape of the "seed" or nucleus of the freshwater pearl, and the position of the "seed" in the mussel determines the ultimate shape the cultured pearl will take, hence with careful advanced planning cultured pearls can be made round. Cultured pearls have a similar color to natural pearls as the nacre is laid down by the mantle of the freshwater mussel, and thus the color of the pearl may be species specific. Exportation of freshwater mussels for the use in the Japanese cultured pearl industry has supported the North American freshwater mussel fisheries since the late 1950s. The mother of pearl (or nacre) from exported freshwater mussels are used to make a bead nucleus which is placed in a living animal to form a pearl. In the 1990s, the United States exported $50 million worth of freshwater mussel shells to Japan. Exports of freshwater mussel shells declined so that by 2002 the annual revenue of freshwater mussel exportation to Japan had dropped to $35 million. By 1993 in the United States 31 different states were still reporting production of freshwater pearls and export of freshwater mussel shells, including: Alabama, Arkansas, Georgia, Illinois, Indiana, Iowa, Kentucky, Louisiana, Minnesota, Missouri, Nebraska, North Dakota, Oklahoma, South Carolina, South Dakota, Tennessee, Texas, and Wisconsin. To this date the bulk of the freshwater mussel shell and freshwater pearl production comes from Alabama, Arkansas, Louisiana, and Tennessee.

In 1963 the first experimental United States freshwater mussel cultured pearl farm was established in Tennessee by John Latendresse, who is widely proclaimed as "the father of the U.S. cultured freshwater pearl industry." Over the course of nearly 30 years, John Latendresse devoted his money, time and effort to research and develop the cultured freshwater pearl industry in the United States. There are currently six freshwater cultured pearl farms in Tennessee and one in California to support the increasing popularity and demand of freshwater pearl jewelry with consumers in the United States.

=== Button manufacturing industry ===
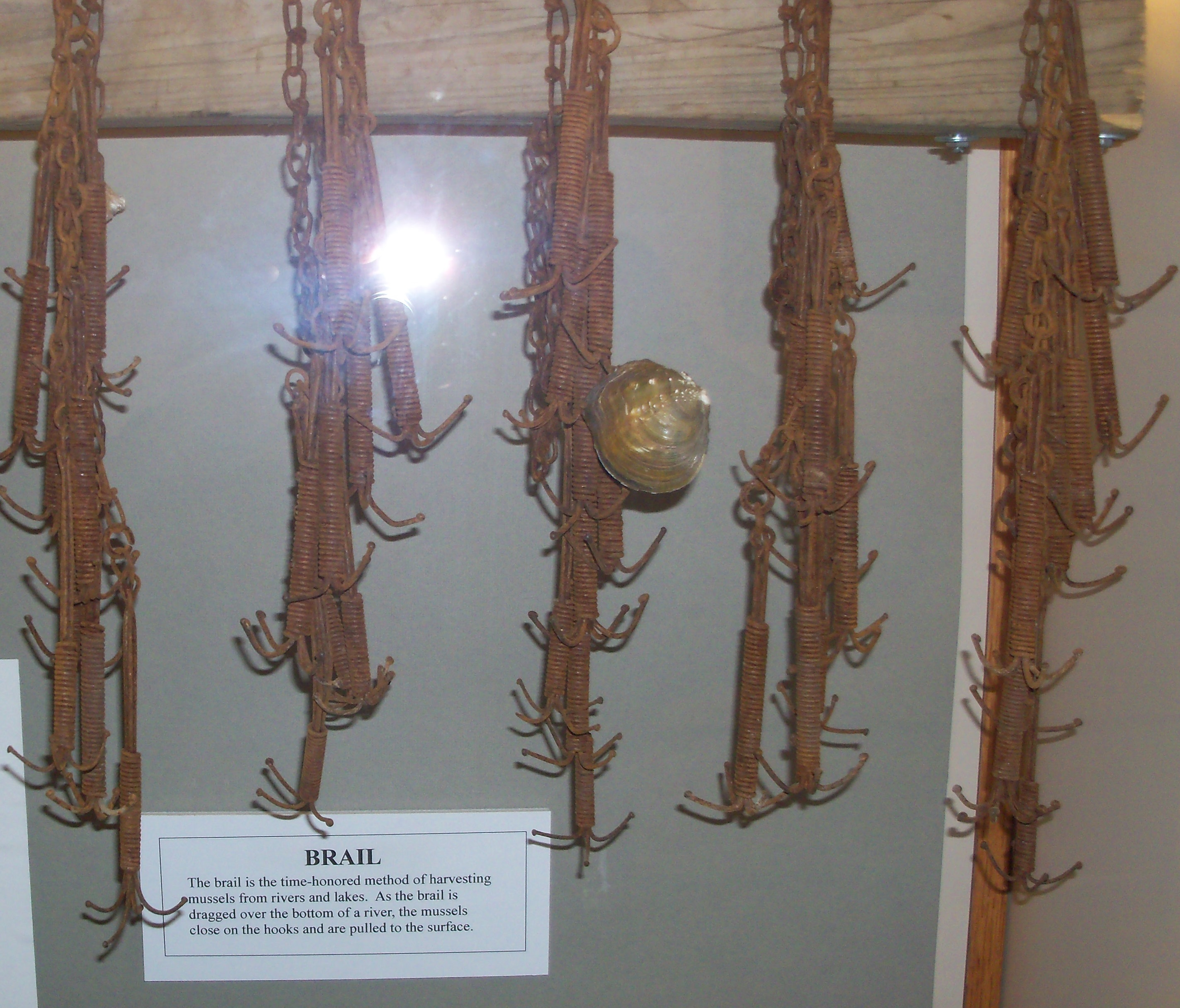
Brail hooks dragged on bed of a lake or river to harvest mussels

The North American button industry began with a German craftsman named John Boepple, who had made buttons from seashells, horns and antlers in his native country. John Boepple immigrated to the United States in 1887 and found that there were vast beds of thick freshwater mussel shells in Muscatine, Iowa, which he determined were perfect for making "pearl buttons". By 1891, Boepple had set up a shop and was in business as a craftsman making buttons. John Boepple's buttons became popular locally and to ward off competition he was very protective of the secrets of his trade. Since freshwater mussels were so common and the profit potential in making "pearl" buttons was so high, some of Boepple's staff who knew his techniques were "recruited" by other businessmen to start competing businesses. Within a few years there were button factories along the length of the Mississippi River.

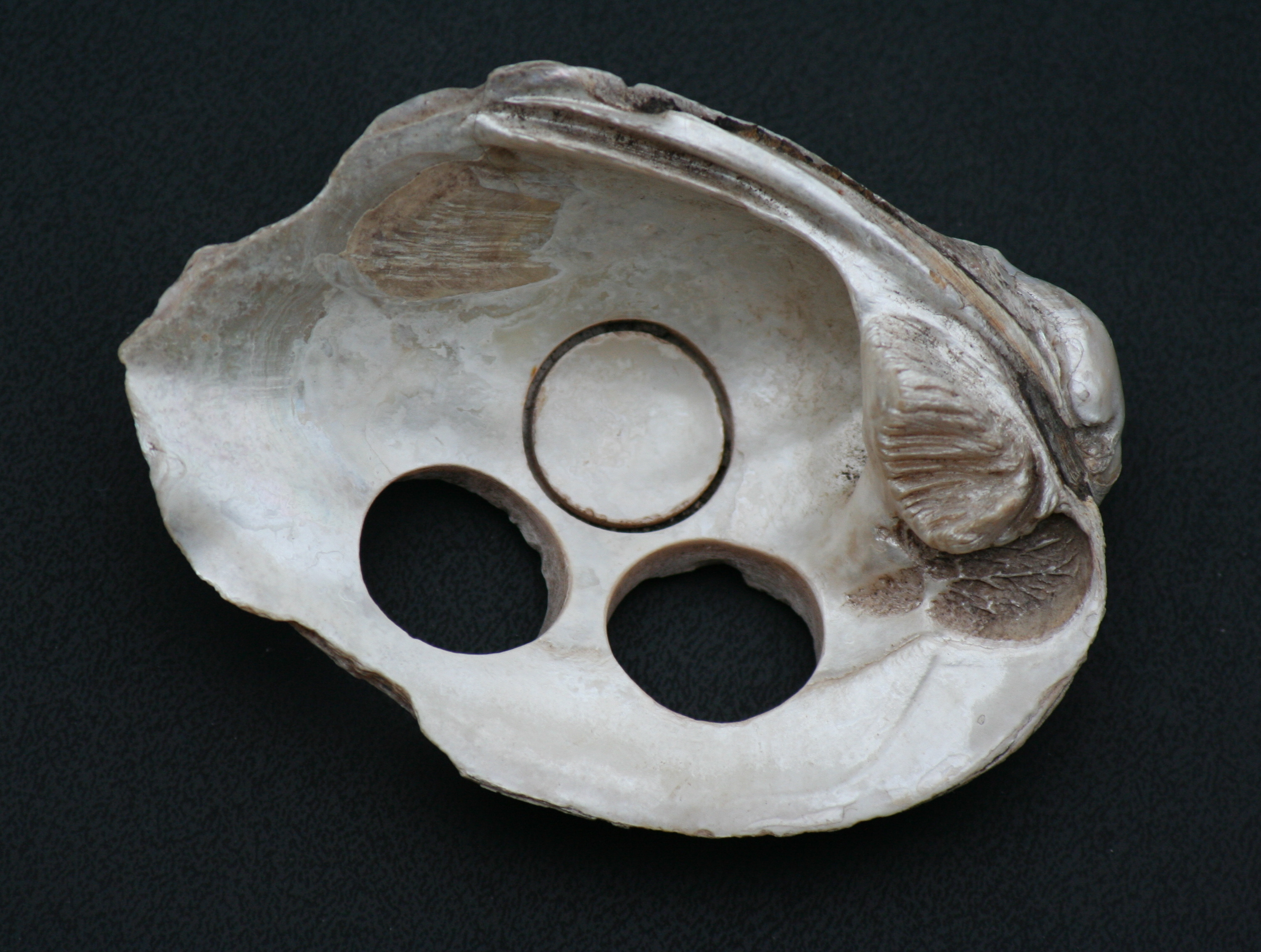
Unionida shell used in button manufacturing.

The need to "catch" freshwater mussels for the "pearl" button industry spurred the invention of tools to make the job easier than "pollywogging" with bare feet. In 1897 inventive mussel fishermen bent steel bars into wide open hooks which they called "brail hooks" or "crow foots" and used them to try to catch or trap the freshwater mussels. The process was simple: several of these "brail hooks" were attached to a long wooden bar with lengths of rope and the entire assembly was lowered into the river and dragged behind a boat along the river bottom. When the tips of these hooks came in contact with an "open" freshwater mussel, the mussel clamped its valves shut around the hooks and could be lifted from the bottom. Within a short period of time millions of freshwater mussels were collected in this manner.

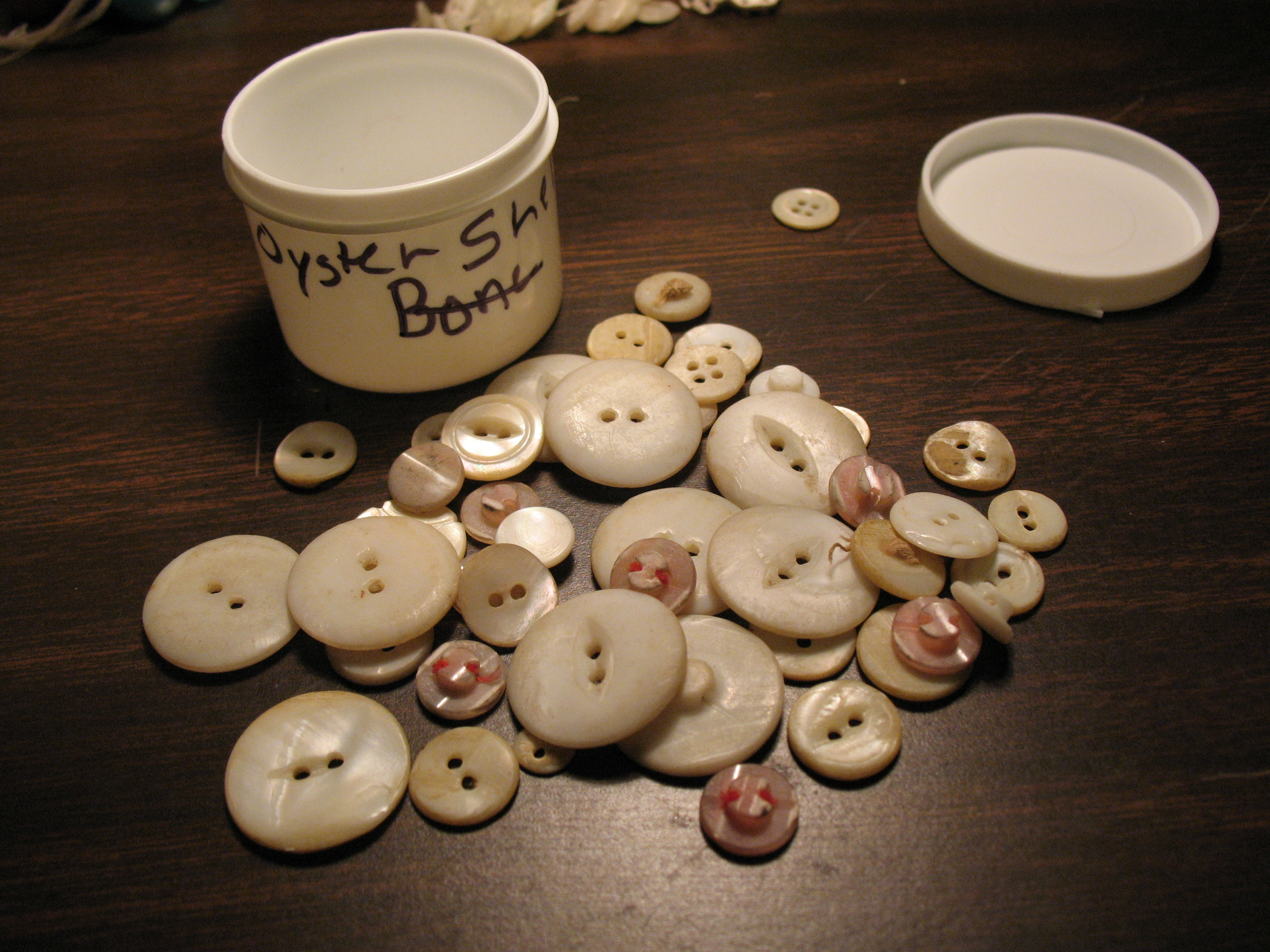
"Pearl" buttons made from shells.

By 1899, there were sixty button factories in the river states of Illinois, Iowa, Missouri, and Wisconsin, employing 1,917 people. Millions of "pearl" buttons were made annually. This new button industry quickly placed a huge ecological demand on the freshwater mussels of the Midwestern United States. In 1899, clammers harvested over sixteen million pounds of freshwater mussel shells in Wisconsin alone, and the harvest of freshwater mussels in the late 1890s numbered in the tens of millions of pounds per year. Freshwater mussel beds which had previously been so dense as to virtually "carpet" miles of river bottom were almost completely harvested, leaving just a few living freshwater mussels per mile. In 1908, in what was deemed a drastic response to the rapidly declining freshwater mussel population, the U.S. Bureau of Fisheries established a mussel propagation program at the Fairport Biological Station. The purpose of this program was to regulate the overharvesting of freshwater mussels. Freshwater mussels are slow growing sessile organisms, and their reproduction is complex. The button industry in North America was in trouble because years of overharvesting the freshwater mussels had caused a shortage of freshwater mussels and pushed many of the species close to extinction. The invention of plastic and its use in manufacturing buttons during World War II replaced shell "pearl" buttons as the most popular product, and foreshadowed the end of the pearl button manufacturing business.

== Taxonomy ==
The superfamilies and families in the order Unionida, as listed by Bieler et al (2010), with later additions to the taxonomy also shown. The use of † indicate families and superfamilies that are extinct.

Unionida

- Genus †Araripenaia Silva et al., 2020 (possibly a hyriid or a trigonioid)
- Superfamily †Archanodontoidea Modell, 1957 (placement in Unionida uncertain)
  - Family †Archanodontidae Modell, 1957
- Superfamily †Deccanoidea Shah & Patel, 2024
  - Family †Deccanoidae Shah & Patel, 2024
- Superfamily Etherioidea Deshayes, 1832
  - Family Etheriidae Deshayes, 1832 (About 4 species) (syn: Mulleriidae, Pseudomulleriidae)
  - Family Iridinidae Swainson, 1840 (About 30 species) (syn: Mutelidae, Pleiodontidae)
  - Family Mycetopodidae Gray, 1840 (Between 40 and 50 species)
- Superfamily Hyrioidea Swainson, 1840
  - Family Hyriidae Swainson, 1840 (Nearly 90 species)
- Superfamily †Trigonioidoidea Cox, 1952
  - Genus ?†Monginellopsis Silva et al., 2020
  - Family †Trigonioididae Cox, 1952
  - Family †Jilinoconchidae Ma, 1989 (placement uncertain)
  - Family †Nakamuranaiadidae Guo, 1981 (syn:Sinonaiinae, Nippononaiidae)
  - Family †Plicatounionidae Chen, 1988
  - Family †Pseudohyriidae Kobayashi, 1968
  - Family †Sainschandiidae Kolesnikov, 1977
- Superfamily Unionoidea Rafinesque, 1820
  - Genus †Protopleurobema Delvene & Araujo, 2009
  - Genus †Triaslacus Bogan & Weaver, 2012 (possibly an unionid)
  - Family Unionidae Rafinesque, 1820 (Fewer than 700 species)
  - Family †Liaoningiidae Yu & Dong, 1993 (placement uncertain)
  - Family Margaritiferidae Henderson, 1929 (Presumably fewer than 10 species) (syn:Margaritaninae, Cumberlandiinae, Promargaritiferidae)
  - Family †Monginaiidae Delvene, Munt, Royo-Torres & Cobos, 2022
  - Family †Sancticarolitidae Simone & Mezzalira, 1997
- Suborder †Silesunionina Skawina & Dzik, 2011 (paraphyletic; an intermediate group between Unionida and Trigoniida)
  - Superfamily †Silesunionoidea Skawina & Dzik, 2011
    - Genus †Cratonaia Silva et al., 2019
    - Family ?†Anthracosiidae Amalitzky, 1898
    - Family †Trigonodidae Modell, 1942
    - Family †Silesunionidae Skawina & Dzik, 2011
    - Family †Unionellidae Skawina & Dzik, 2011
