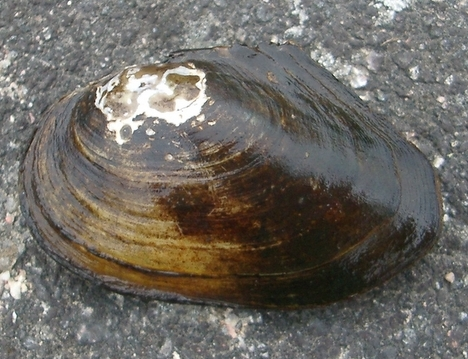
- Anodonta anatina

Scientific classification
- Domain: Eukaryota
- Kingdom: Animalia
- Phylum: Mollusca
- Class: Bivalvia
- Subclass: Autobranchia
- Infraclass: Heteroconchia
- Subterclass: Palaeoheterodonta; Newell, 1965

Orders
- Trigoniida; Unionida

= Palaeoheterodonta =

Palaeoheterodonta Temporal range: Devonian–recent

Subclass of bivalves

Palaeoheterodonta is a subterclass of bivalve molluscs. It contains the extant orders Unionida (freshwater mussels) and Trigoniida. They are distinguished by having the two halves of the shell be of equal size and shape, but by having the hinge teeth be in a single row, rather than separated into two groups, as they are in the clams and cockles.

== 2010 Taxonomy of the Palaeoheterodonta ==
In 2010 a new proposed classification system for the Bivalvia was published in by Bieler, Carter & Coan revising the classification of the Bivalvia, including the subclass Paleoheterodonta. Superfamilies and families as listed by Bieler et al. Use of † indicate families and superfamilies that are extinct.

Subterclass: Palaeoheterodonta

=== Order: Trigoniida ===
- †Beichuanioidea Liu & Gu, 1988
  - †Beichuaniidae Liu & Gu, 1988
- †Megatrigonioidea Van Hoepen, 1929
  - †Megatrigoniidae Van Hoepen, 1929
  - †Iotrigoniidae Savelive, 1958
  - †Rutitrigoniidae Van Hoepen, 1929
- †Myophorelloidea Kobayashi, 1954
  - †Myophorellidae Kobayashi, 1954
  - †Buchotrigoniidae Leanza, 1993</small
  - †Laevitrigoniidae Savelive, 1958
  - †Vaugoniidae Kobayashi, 1954
- Trigonioidea Lamarck, 1819
  - Trigoniidae Lamarck, 1819
  - †Eoschizodidae Newell & Boyd, 1975 (syn: Curtonotidae)
  - †Groeberellidae Pérez, Reyes, & Danborenea 1995
  - †Myophoriidae Bronn, 1849 (syn: Cytherodontidae, Costatoriidae, Gruenewaldiidae)
  - †Prosogyrotrigoniidae Kobayashi, 1954
  - †Scaphellinidae Newell & Ciriacks, 1962
  - †Schizodidae Newell & Boyd, 1975
  - †Sinodoridae Pojeta & Zhang, 1984

=== Order: Unionida ===
- Superfamily †Archanodontoidea Modell, 1957 (placement in Unionoida uncertain)
  - Family †Archanodontidae Modell, 1957
- Superfamily Etherioidea Deshayes, 1832
  - Family Etheriidae Deshayes, 1832 (syn: Mulleriidae, Pseudomulleriidae)
  - Family Iridinidae Swainson, 1840 (syn: Mutelidae, Pleiodontidae)
  - Family Mycetopodidae Gray, 1840
- Superfamily Hyrioidea Swainson, 1840
  - Family Hyriidae Swainson, 1840
- Superfamily †Trigonioidoidea Cox, 1952
  - Family †Trigonioididae Cox, 1952
  - Family †Jilinoconchidae Ma, 1989 (placement uncertain)
  - Family †Nakamuranaiadidae Guo, 1981 (syn:Sinonaiinae, Nippononaiidae)
  - Family †Plicatounionidae Chen, 1988
  - Family †Pseudohyriidae Kobayashi, 1968
  - Family †Sainschandiidae Kolesnikov, 1977
- Superfamily Unionoidea Rafinesque, 1820
  - Family Unionidae Rafinesque, 1820
  - Family Liaoningiidae Yu & Dong, 1993 (placement uncertain)
  - Family Margaritiferidae Henderson, 1929 (syn:Margaritaninae, Cumberlandiinae, Promargaritiferidae)
  - Family †Sancticarolitidae Simone & Mezzalira, 1997
