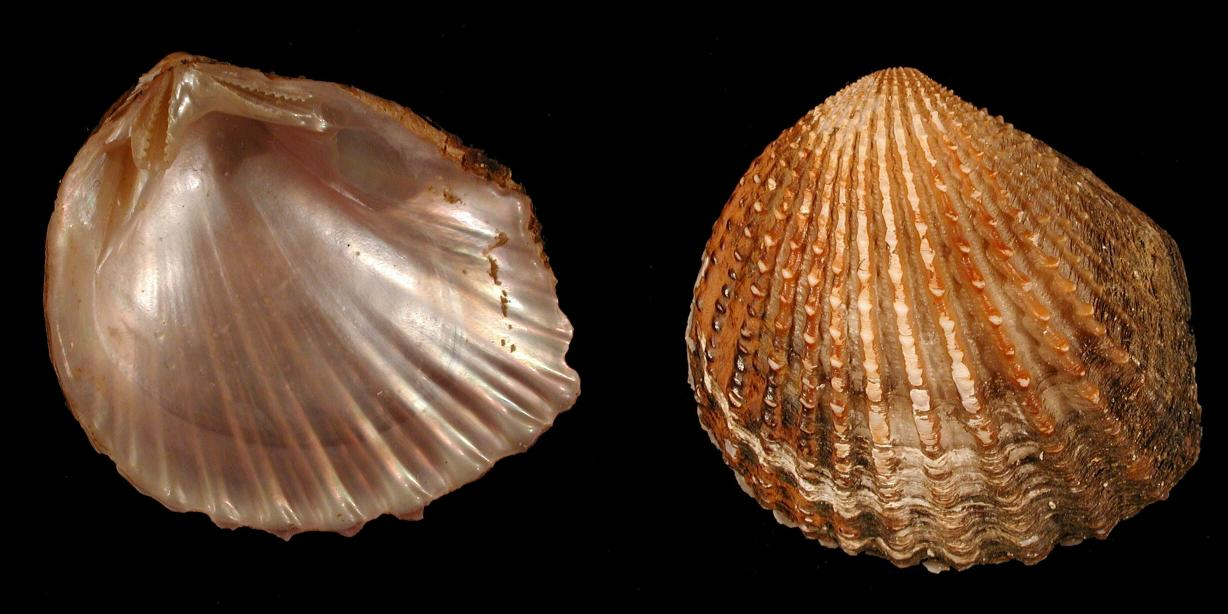
- A whole shell of Neotrigonia margaritacea with the valves separated. The right valve is on the left.

Scientific classification
- Kingdom: Animalia
- Phylum: Mollusca
- Class: Bivalvia
- Order: Trigoniida
- Family: Trigoniidae
- Subfamily: Trigoniinae
- Genus: Neotrigonia; Cossmann, 1912

= Neotrigonia =

Genus of bivalves

Neotrigonia is a genus of living saltwater clams, in the family Trigoniidae, which otherwise consists only of fossil genera. For a long time the entire family was thought to be long extinct, but a living species that is now placed in this genus was discovered in 1802. At that time it was assigned to the fossil genus Trigonia. Currently, according to the World Register of Marine Species, 8 extant species in this genus are recognized.

== Discovery of the genus ==
Until the beginning of the 19th century, no living species in this superfamily had ever been discovered, although numerous fossil species were known. The superfamily was well known as fossils from the Devonian to the Cretaceous Period. In 1802, however, François Péron discovered a living species in waters off the coast of Tasmania. In 1804, Lamarck named that species Trigonia margaritacea, and Cossmann renamed the genus Neotrigonia in 1912. Today, eight living species are known to exist, all of which are found off the coast of Australia and Tasmania. Neotrigonia probably evolved from Eotrigonia (Eocene to Miocene) during the Miocene epoch.

== Species ==
Species within the genus Neotrigonia include:

- Neotrigonia bednalli (Verco, 1907)
- Neotrigonia gemma Iredale, 1924
- Neotrigonia jacksoni Morrison, 2011
- Neotrigonia kaiyomaruae Habe & Nomoto, 1976
- Neotrigonia lamarckii (Gray, 1838)
- Neotrigonia margaritacea (Lamarck, 1804)
- Neotrigonia strangei (A. Adams, 1854)
- Neotrigonia uniophora (Gray in Jukes, 1847)

Synonym

- Neotrigonia horia Cotton, 195: synonym of Neotrigonia bednalli (Verco, 1907)
