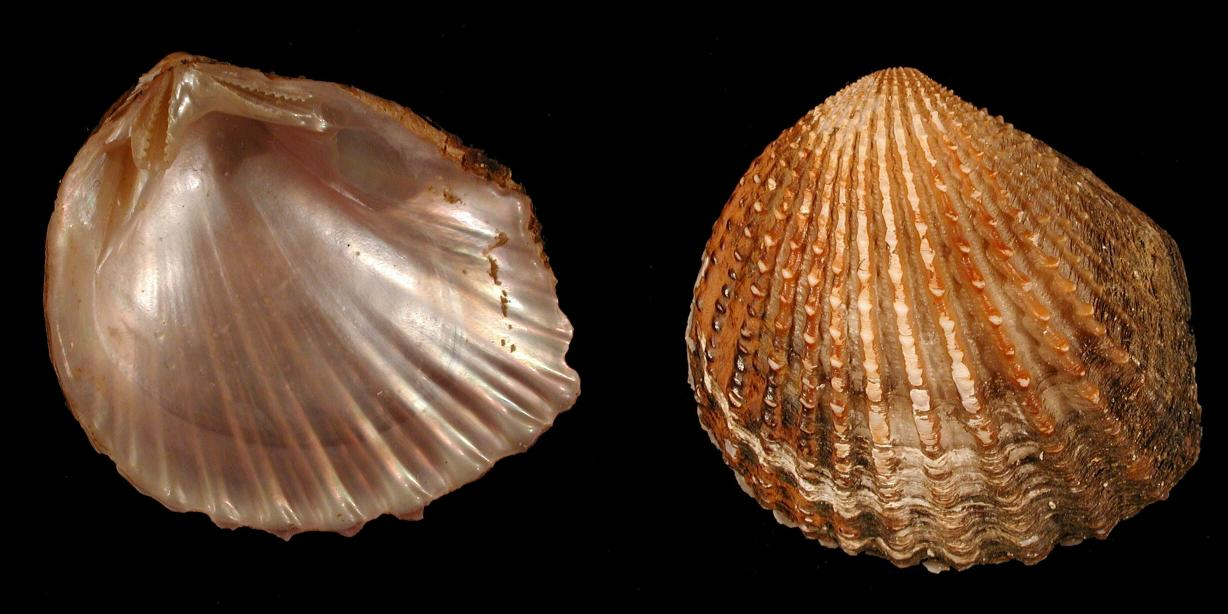
- A whole shell of Neotrigonia margaritacea with the valves separated. The right valve is on the left.

Scientific classification
- Kingdom: Animalia
- Phylum: Mollusca
- Class: Bivalvia
- Order: Trigoniida
- Family: Trigoniidae
- Genus: Neotrigonia
- Species: N. margaritacea

Binomial name
- Neotrigonia margaritacea (Lamarck, 1804)

Synonyms
- Trigonia antarctica Péron & Lesueur, 1807; Trigonia margaritacea Lamarck, 1804; Trigonia nobilis A. Adams, 1854; Trigonia pectinata Lamarck, 1819

= Neotrigonia margaritacea =

Species of bivalve

Neotrigonia margaritacea, common name the pearly brooch-shell, is a species of saltwater clam, a marine bivalve mollusc in the family Trigoniidae. This species is known from sandy substrates in shallow seas in southeastern and southwestern Australia. This species was the first member of the family to be discovered alive; previous to its discovery, trigoniids were only known from fossils.

== History ==
Jean-Baptiste Lamarck first described Neotrigonia margaritacea (under the name Trigonia margaritacea) in 1804. It was what is now known as a "living fossil", being the first known living member of the Trigoniidae, a family of bivalve mollusks that was well known from fossils, but that had been thought to have become extinct not long after the end of the Mesozoic Era. In 1912, Cossman renamed the genus Neotrigonia, and this genus now contains several other species discovered subsequently, all from the waters around Australia and Tasmania.

== Description ==
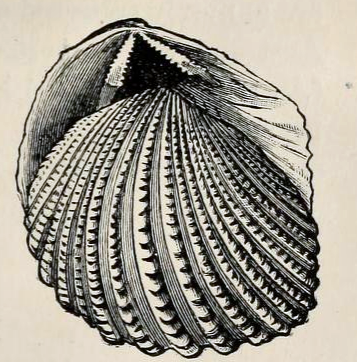
1901 illustration of a shell of what was then known as Trigonia margaritacea, in the British Museum

The shell of Neotrigonia margaritacea is thick and heavy for its size. The typical width of the adult shell is 40 mm (1.6 in). In the living animal, the interior of the valves is nacreous and tinged pink. This colour can eventually be lost in empty shells, though a metallic lustre does persist.

This clam is capable of opening its shell quite widely; the valves are kept properly aligned and articulated by a series of massive and smaller teeth on the hinge line. The animal does not have siphons. It respires using filibranch gills. The foot is basically L-shaped, large and muscular, with an additional heel-like lobe.

== Ecology ==
Neotrigonia margaritacea is a suspension feeder which lives in sand. It is able to move about and can use its foot to jump.
