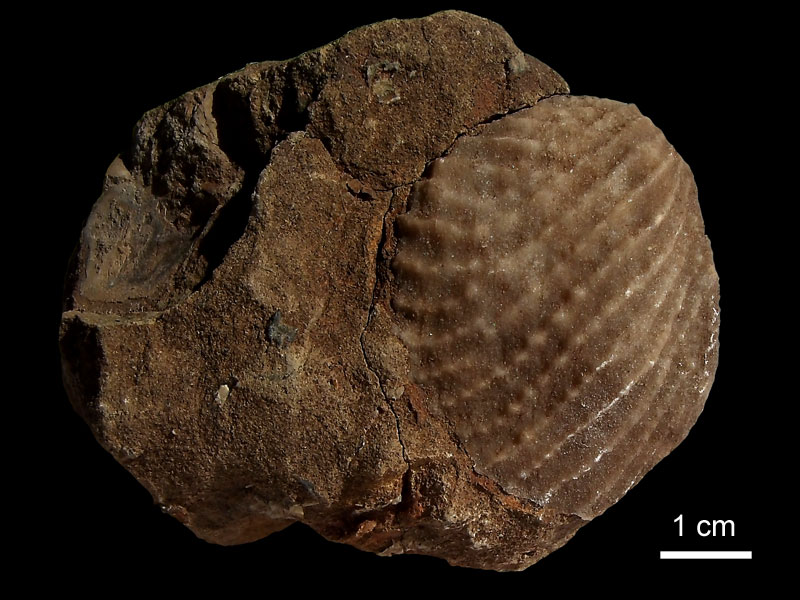

Scientific classification
- Domain: Eukaryota
- Kingdom: Animalia
- Phylum: Mollusca
- Class: Bivalvia
- Order: Trigoniida
- Family: Trigoniidae
- Subfamily: †Myophorellinae
- Genus: †Myophorella; Bayle, 1878

= Myophorella =

Myophorella Temporal range: Jurassic–Cretaceous

Extinct genus of bivalves

Myophorella is a genus of fossil saltwater clams, marine bivalve mollusks in the family Trigoniidae. These bivalves are sometimes preserved with mineralized soft tissue.
