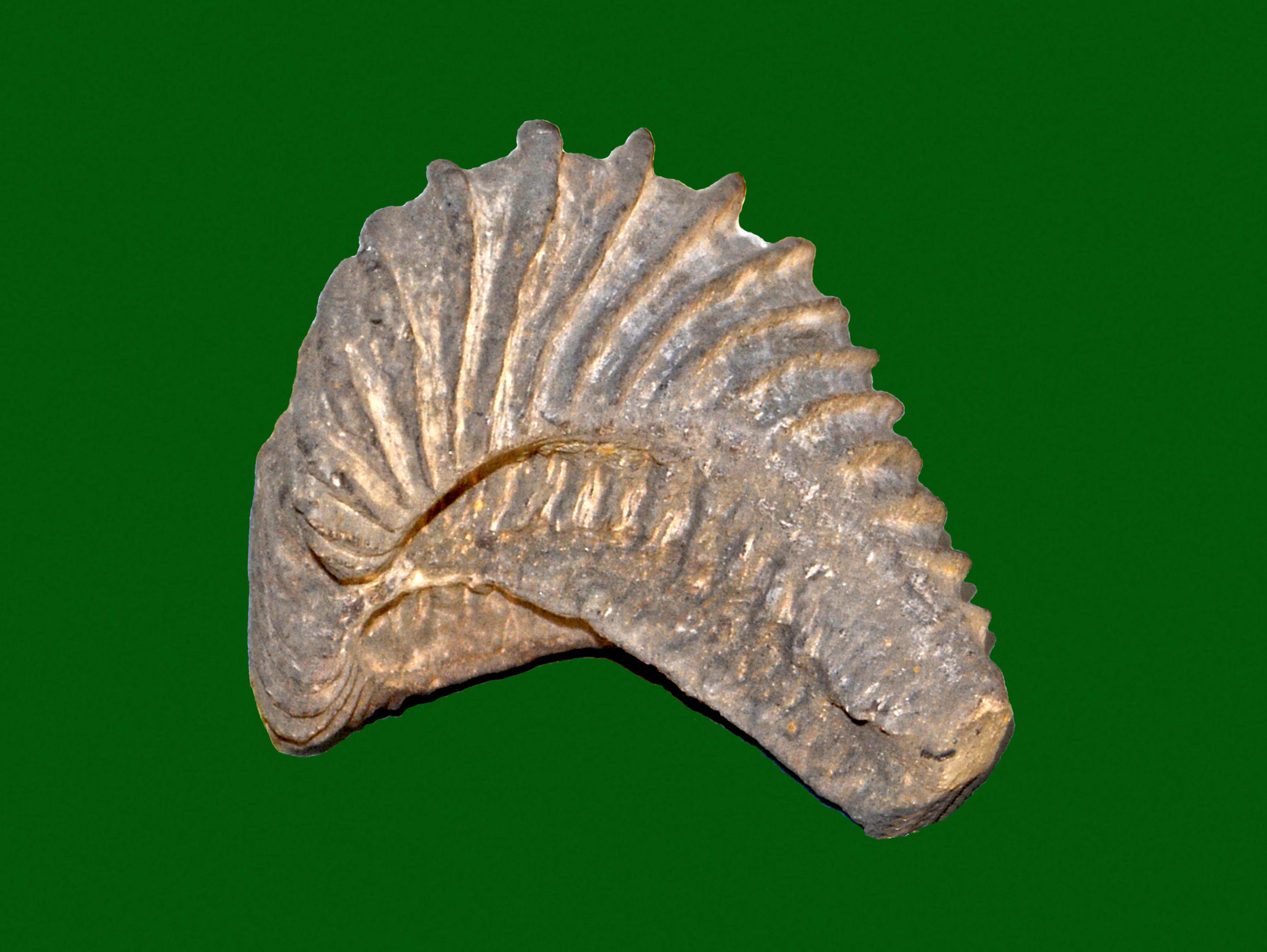
- Pterotrigonia caudata fossil from the Isle of Wight at Galerie de paléontologie et d'anatomie comparée, Paris

Scientific classification
- Domain: Eukaryota
- Kingdom: Animalia
- Phylum: Mollusca
- Class: Bivalvia
- Order: Trigoniida
- Superfamily: †Megatrigonioidea
- Family: †Pterotrigoniidae
- Genus: †Pterotrigonia van Hoepen, 1929

Type species
- †Pterotrigonia cristata van Hoepen, 1929

Species
- †Pterotrigonia cristata van Hoepen, 1929; †Pterotrigonia flava M. Griffin & Varela, 2012; †Pterotrigonia jubata van Hoepen, 1929; †Pterotrigonia setosa van Hoepen, 1929

Synonyms
- †Pterotrigonia (Pterotrigonia) van Hoepen, 1929 superseded rank

= Pterotrigonia =

Pterotrigonia Temporal range: Jurassic to Cretaceous

Extinct genus of bivalves

Pterotrigonia is an extinct genus of saltwater clams, marine bivalve molluscs in the family Megatrigoniidae. This genus is known in the fossil record from the Jurassic period Tithonian age to the Cretaceous period Maastrichtian age. Species in this genus were facultatively mobile infaunal suspension feeders. The type species of the genus is Pterotrigonia cristata.

Pterotrigonia thoracica was selected as the state fossil of Tennessee in 1998.

Scabrotrigonia is a subgenus of Pterotrigonia.

== Distribution ==
Fossils of species within this genus have been found in the Jurassic of Antarctica, Chile and India, as well as in the Cretaceous of Angola, Antarctica, Argentina, Austria, Bulgaria, Chile, Colombia, Cuba, Ecuador, Egypt, France, Hungary, Italy, Japan, Libya, Madagascar, Mexico, Mozambique, New Zealand, Oman, Peru, Portugal, Serbia and Montenegro, South Africa, Spain, Trinidad and Tobago, Russia, Ukraine, United Arab Emirates, United Kingdom, United States and Yemen.
