= Trigonioidoidea =

Trigonioidoidea Temporal range: Late Jurassic–Late Cretaceous

Scientific classification
- Kingdom: Animalia
- Phylum: Mollusca
- Class: Bivalvia
- Order: ?Unionida
- Superfamily: Trigonioidoidea L. R. Cox, 1952

Families
- Nakamuranaiidae; Trigonioididae; Plicatounionidae; Pseudohyriidae

Extinct superfamily of bivalves

Trigonioidoidea is an extinct superfamily of bivalves, mostly occurring in Mesozoic non-marine strata of Asia. They range from the Late Jurassic to the Late Cretaceous. They are a primarily freshwater group of mollusks, and are included in the Palaeoheterodonta. Though, within Palaeoheterodonta, there are disagreements on whether they belong to the Unionida or Trigoniida.

== Morphological description ==
Members of the Trigonioidoidea were initially classified into separate families of either Unionids or Trigoniids. The superfamily Trigonioidoidea was initially created by Cox in 1952 (as Trigonioidacea), though no morphological definition was made. Sha and Fürsich(1993) would later define the superfamily as Unionids with the anterior pedal retractor scar distinctly separated from the anterior adductor scar.

Trigonioidoids come in a variety of surface ornaments, including concentric growth rings, radial ribs, and 'wavy folds'(plicae). They are especially apparent on Trigonioidids, with their often oblique ribs creating V or chevron-shaped patterns. Divaricate patterns are also known from some modern Unionids, though they are more commonly associated with extinct Trigoniids. Plicatounionids and Pseudohyriids possess large plicae alongside radial ribs.

When preserved in good quality, the inner surface of Trigonioidoids can yield key features for classification. Muscle scars, when preserved, show two adductors each in the front and back, as well as a small but distinct anterior pedal retractor. The pallial lines are simple, which suggests that they did not possess true siphons. Trigonioidoids possess schizodont hinge teeth, which consist of two compartments: the pseudocardinals on the anterior side, and the posterio-laterals on the posterior side. Some members of the superfamily may possess crenulations on the hinge teeth, either on the pseudocardinals, posterio-laterals, or on both.

== Taxonomy ==
Sha(2007) divides the Trigonioidoidea into four families - Nakamuranaiidae, Trigonioididae, Plicatounionidae, and Pseudohyriidae. Meanwhile, Chen(2008) and Stiller and Chen(2019) consider the Nippononaiidae separate from Trigonioididae.

== Paleoecology ==
Trigonioidoids were primarily freshwater-dwelling bivalves, and would have been sessile benthic filter feeders. Their simple pallial lines suggest they did not have true siphons, and thus were relegated to shallow burrowing. The strong pedal retractor impressions on the shell suggest they could withdraw the foot quickly. However, the same can not be said about the pedal protractor, suggesting that the stretching of the foot was quite slow.

The preserved original patterns of three Trigonioidoid species(Trigonioides tetoriensis, Plicatounio naktongensis, and Matsumotoina matsumotoi) have been found in the Kitadani Formation of Japan. The remaining patterns bear similarities to modern Unionids.

Trigonioidoids can be found in association with other freshwater mollusks, such as Unionids, Sphaeriids, and freshwater gastropods.
