= Latendresse =

Latendresse is a French surname borne by the following people:

- Alexandrine Latendresse (born 1984), Canadian politician from Quebec
- Guillaume Latendresse (born 1987), Canadian ice hockey player
- John Latendresse (1925–2000), American collector

== See also ==
- La Tendresse
