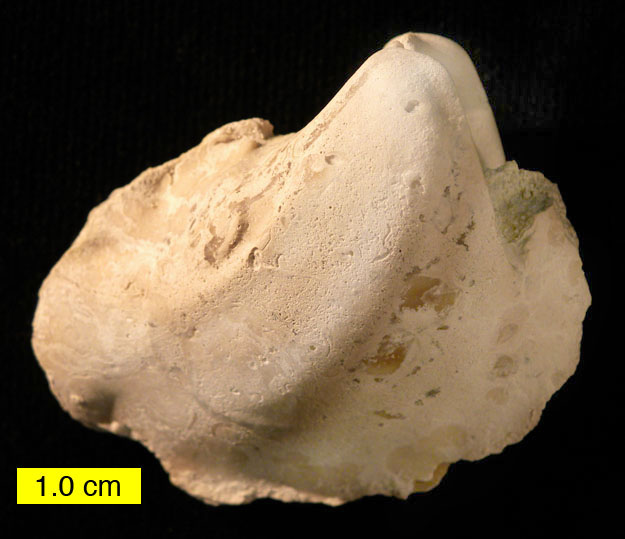
- An internal mold of Laevitrigonia gibbosa from the Portland Limestone (Upper Jurassic), Isle of Portland, Dorset, England, scale bar is 1 cm

Scientific classification
- Domain: Eukaryota
- Kingdom: Animalia
- Phylum: Mollusca
- Class: Bivalvia
- Order: Trigoniida
- Family: Trigoniidae
- Subfamily: †Laevitrigoniinae
- Genus: †Laevitrigonia

= Laevitrigonia =

Extinct genus of bivalves

Laevitrigonia is a genus of fossil clams, marine bivalve mollusks in the family Trigoniidae. This bivalve is sometimes preserved with mineralized soft-tissue.
