= Cultured freshwater pearls =

Pearl created by freshwater mollusks under human-controlled conditions

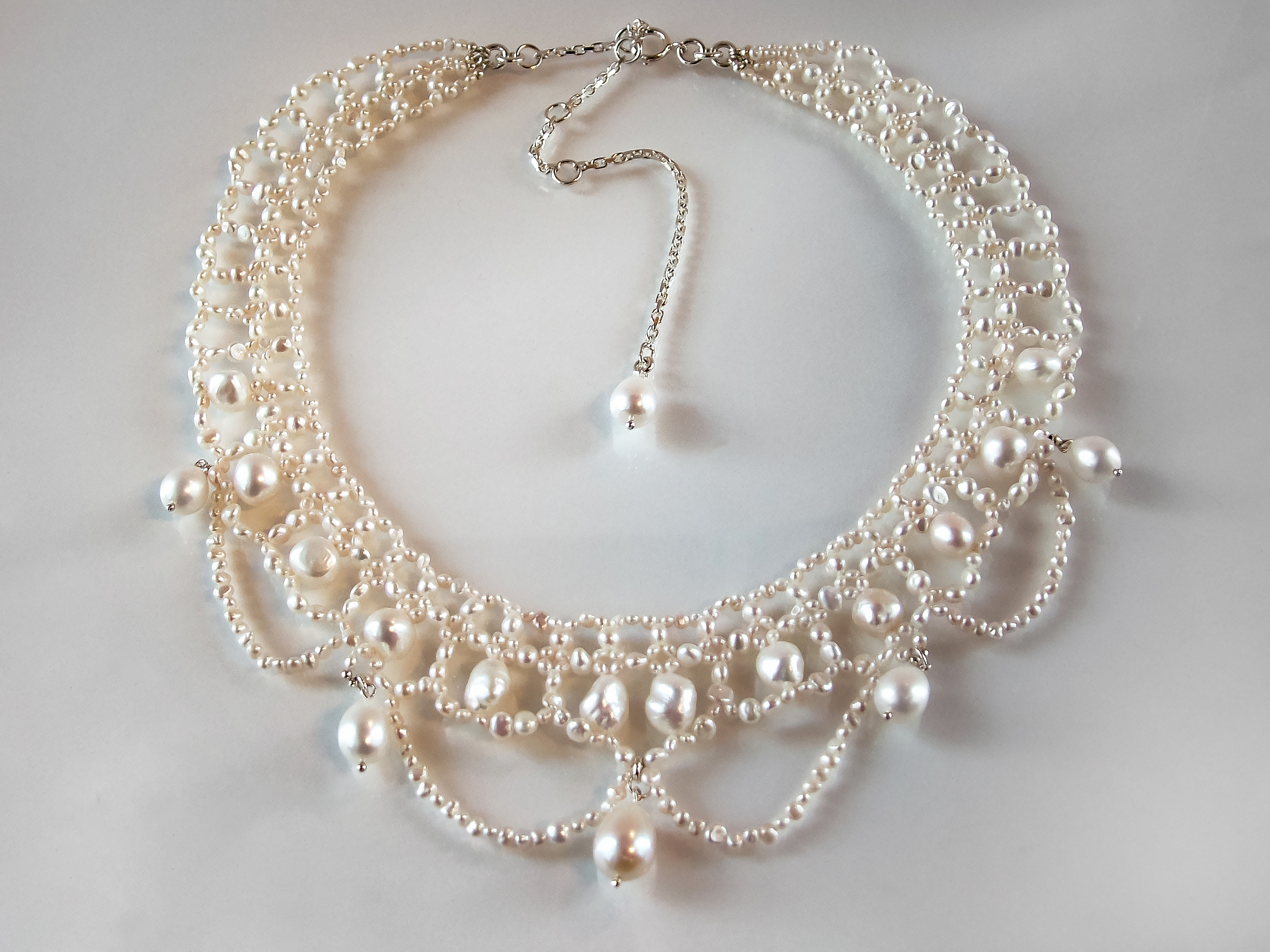
Necklace made from cultured freshwater pearls of different shapes and sizes, with a silver clasp.

Cultured freshwater pearls are pearls that are farmed and created using freshwater mussels. These pearls are produced in Japan and the United States on a limited scale, but are now almost exclusively produced in China. The U.S. Federal Trade Commission requires that farmed freshwater pearls be referred to as "freshwater cultured pearls" in commerce. The quality of cultured freshwater pearls is evaluated through a grading system of a series of A values, based on luster, shape, surface, colour, and matching.

== Current and historic industry ==
Pearls gathered in the wild from the Holarctic saltwater pearl mussel were important sources of pearls for modern jewelry, with Scotland a major source; this species is now endangered in most areas.

Although the Japanese freshwater pearl industry has nearly ceased to exist, it has a normal historic place as the first country to cultivate whole freshwater pearls, which it did in Lake Biwa, using the Biwa pearly mussel (Hyriopsis schlegeli). The industry attempted a comeback with a mussel hybrid (Hyriopsis schlegeli/Hyriopsis cumingi) in Lake Kasumigaura in the last decade, but this venture was also met with failure, with production ceasing in 2006. A pearl farm in Tennessee also holds special historic value as it is the only source of freshwater pearls outside of Asia. Founded by the late John Latendresse, it continues as a tourist attraction. Today China is the only commercial producer of freshwater pearls, producing 1500 tons (2005) using the tetragon shell mussel (Hyriopsis cumingii) and several hybrids that have shown heterosis from several mussel species.

== Grafting ==
A technician performing a grafting operation.

The grafting process begins by choosing a suitable donor mussel and cutting a strip of tissue from the mantle. This strip of tissue is then cut into three-millimeter squares. These squares are delivered to a technician who performs the operation. Unlike saltwater bead nucleation, this process is not considered difficult, and technicians need only minimal training to perform the operation. The technician creates small incisions on the upper valve, and inserts the tissue piece. A small twist of the tissue upon insertion is believed to create a higher ratio of round pearls. After the maximum number of grafts have been performed, the mussel is flipped, and the procedure is performed once again on the other valve of the shell.

Chinese freshwater mussels were once grafted up to 50 times per shell, or 25 times per valve. This practice was common when the industry mussel was primarily the cockscomb pearl mussel (Cristaria plicata). This mussel produced a high volume of low-quality pearls that came to be known as "raisin pearls" in the 1970s and 1980s. More than a decade ago the freshwater pearl industry of China shifted production from the cockscomb pearl mussel to the triangle shell mussel (Hyriopsis cumingii). The triangle shell produced fewer pearls, accepting only 12–16 grafts per valve for a total production of 24 to 32 pearls, but produced pearls of better quality.

== Processing ==
Freshwater pearl harvests are typically bought while still in the shell. After harvest the pearls are delivered to a first-stage factory, which is responsible for cleaning and sorting the pearls by size and shape. After this process has been completed, the pearls are considered ready material for processing factories. The pearls are pre-treated (maeshori) in a warm and cold chemical solution and then bleached. The pearls that exhibit strong coloration only go through the maeshori and are not bleached or dyed.

After the pearls are treated, they are drilled and then polished with a mixture of cornmeal and wax. Finally they are matched into temporary strands, which are then matched again into hanks. Hanks are composed of 5 to 10 temporary strands and are considered wholesale-ready.

== See also ==
- Cultured pearl
- Fishing industry in China
- Agriculture in China
