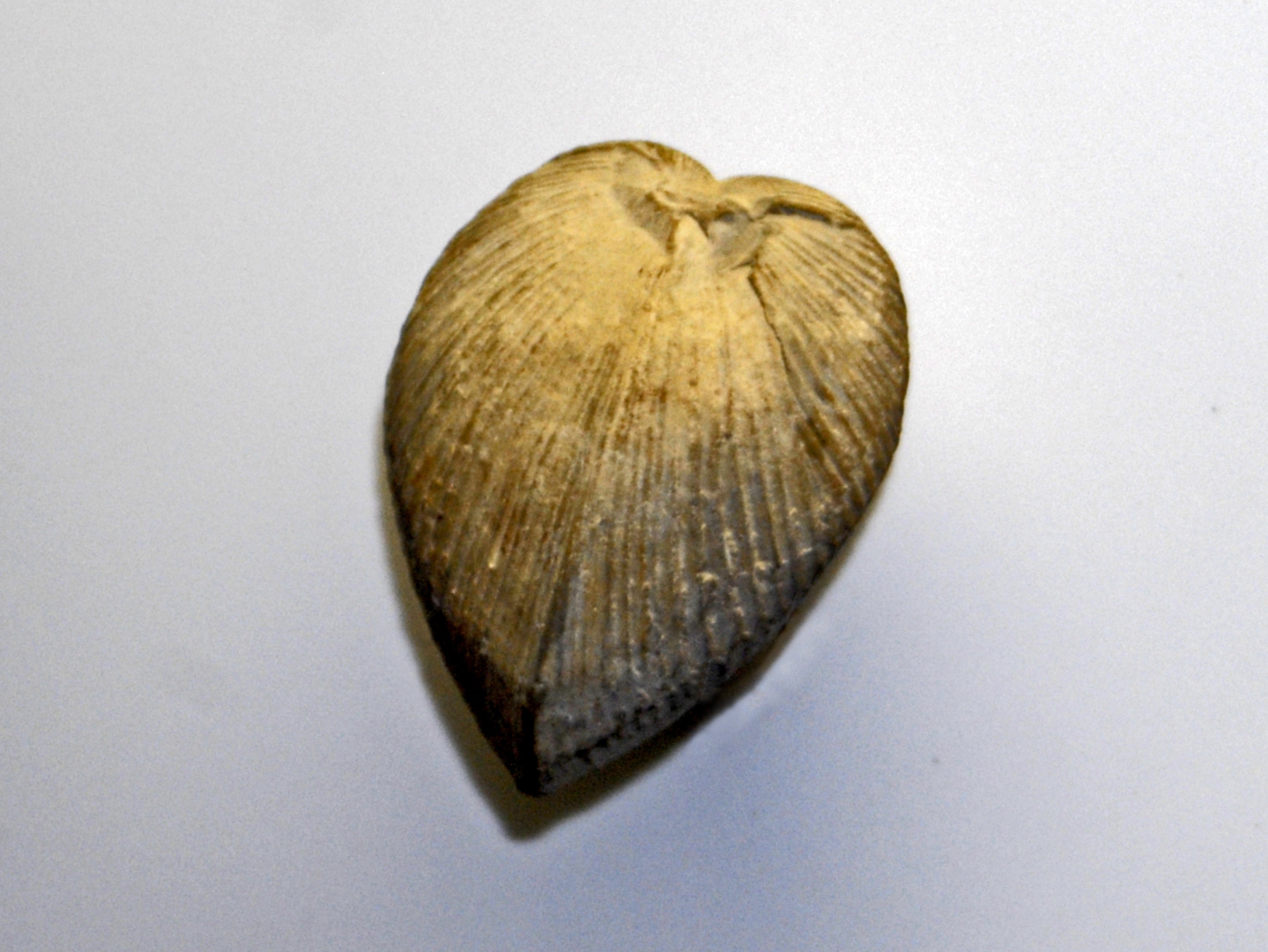
- Fossil specimen of Pholadomya scutata species from Jurassic

Scientific classification
- Kingdom: Animalia
- Phylum: Mollusca
- Class: Bivalvia
- Superorder: Anomalodesmata
- Superfamily: Pholadomyoidea
- Family: Pholadomyidae; Dall, 1905

Genera
- See text.

= Pholadomyidae =

Family of bivalves

Pholadomyidae is a family of saltwater clams, marine bivalve molluscs in the order Anomalodesmata.

== Genera and species ==
Genera and species within the family Pholadomyidae include:

- Panacca
  - Panacca arata (A. E. Verrill and S. Smith, 1881)
  - Panacca loveni (Jeffreys, 1881)
- Pholadomya Sowerby, 1823
  - Pholadomya candida Sowerby, 1823
  - Pholadomya maoria Dell, 1963
- Wilkingia†
