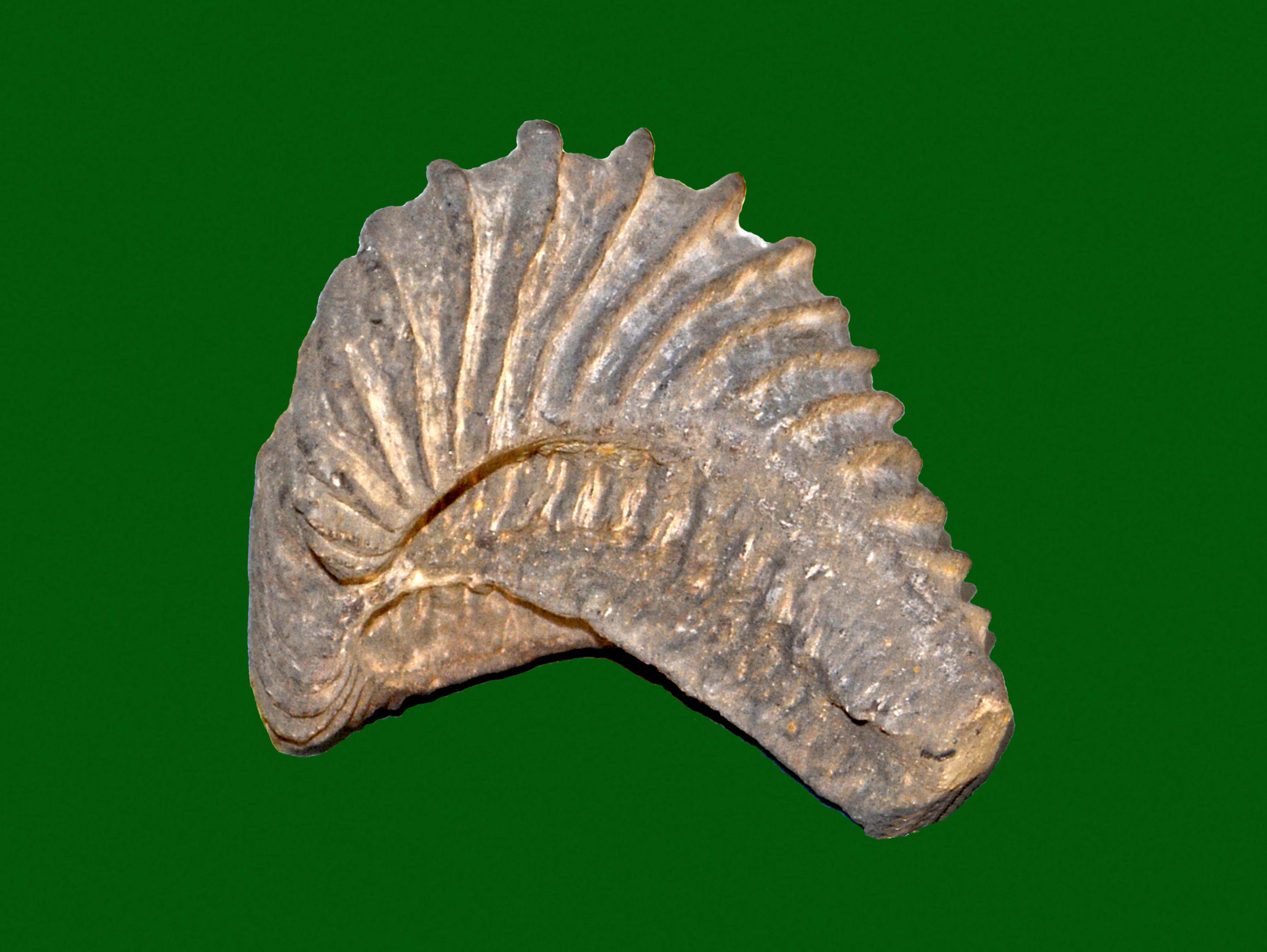
- A fossil of Pterotrigonia caudata (Agassiz 1840) from the Isle of Wight at Galerie de paléontologie et d'anatomie comparée, Paris

Scientific classification
- Domain: Eukaryota
- Kingdom: Animalia
- Phylum: Mollusca
- Class: Bivalvia
- Order: Trigoniida
- Superfamily: †Megatrigonioidea
- Family: †Megatrigoniidae; Van Hoepen, 1929

= Megatrigoniidae =

Megatrigoniidae Temporal range: from Jurassic to Cretaceous, 164.7–66.043 Ma

Extinct family of bivalves

Megatrigoniidae is an extinct family of fossil saltwater clams, marine bivalve molluscs in the subclass Palaeoheterodonta. This family of bivalves is known in the fossil record from the Jurassic period, Tithonian age, to the Cretaceous period, Maastrichtian age. Species in this family were facultatively mobile infaunal suspension feeders.

== Subfamilies and genera ==
Subfamilies and genera within the family Megatrigoniidae:

- Megatrigoniinae van Hoepen 1929
  - Anditrigonia Levy, 1967
  - Antutrigonia H.A. Leanza & Garate, 1987
  - Apiotrigonia Cox 1952
  - Bengtsonella Cooper & Leanza 2019
  - Californigonia Cooper & Leanza 2019
  - Columbitrigonia Poulton, 1977
  - Craginella Cooper & Leanza 2019
  - Damborenella Cooper & Leanza 2019
  - Eoanditrigonia H.A. Leanza, 1993
  - Megatrigonia van Hoepen, 1929
  - Paranditrigonia Reyes & Pérez, 1983
- Pterotrigoniinae van Hoepen 1929
  - Paulckella Cooper et al. 1989
  - Pterotrigonia van Hoepen 1929

== Distribution ==
Fossils of this family have been found in Jurassic of Antarctica, Chile, India and in Cretaceous of Angola, Antarctica, Argentina, Austria, Chile, Colombia, Cuba, Ecuador, Egypt, France, Hungary, Italy, Japan, Libya, Madagascar, Mexico, Mozambique, New Zealand, Oman, Peru, Portugal, Serbia and Montenegro, South Africa, Spain, Trinidad and Tobago, Russia, Ukraine, United Arab Emirates, United Kingdom, United States and Yemen.
