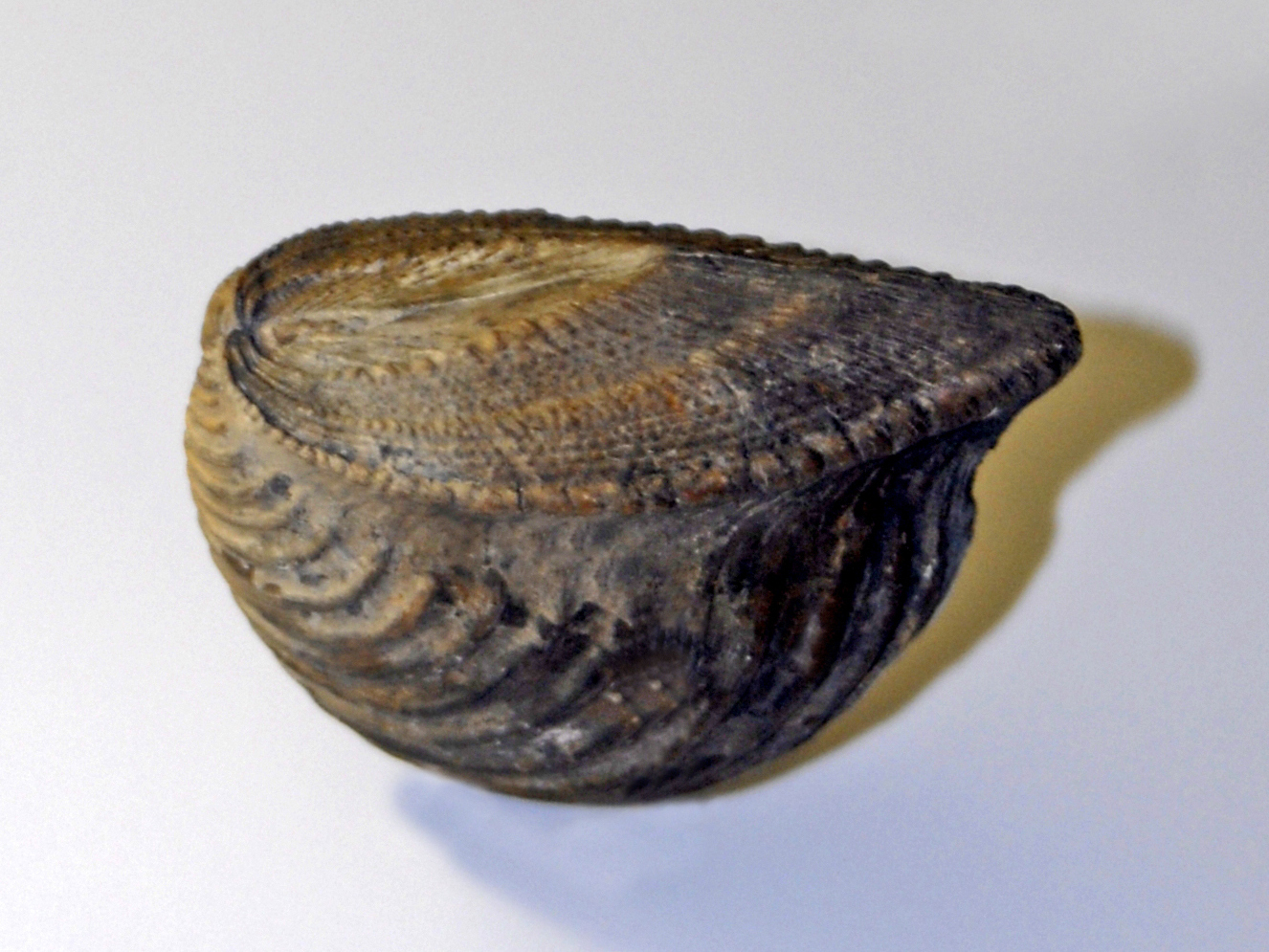
- A fossil shell of T. interlaevigata from Germany, of Jurassic age

Scientific classification
- Kingdom: Animalia
- Phylum: Mollusca
- Class: Bivalvia
- Order: Trigoniida
- Family: Trigoniidae
- Subfamily: Trigoniinae
- Genus: †Trigonia; Bruguière, 1789

Species
- See text

= Trigonia =

Trigonia Temporal range: Permian-Paleocene ~298–56 Ma

Extinct genus of bivalves

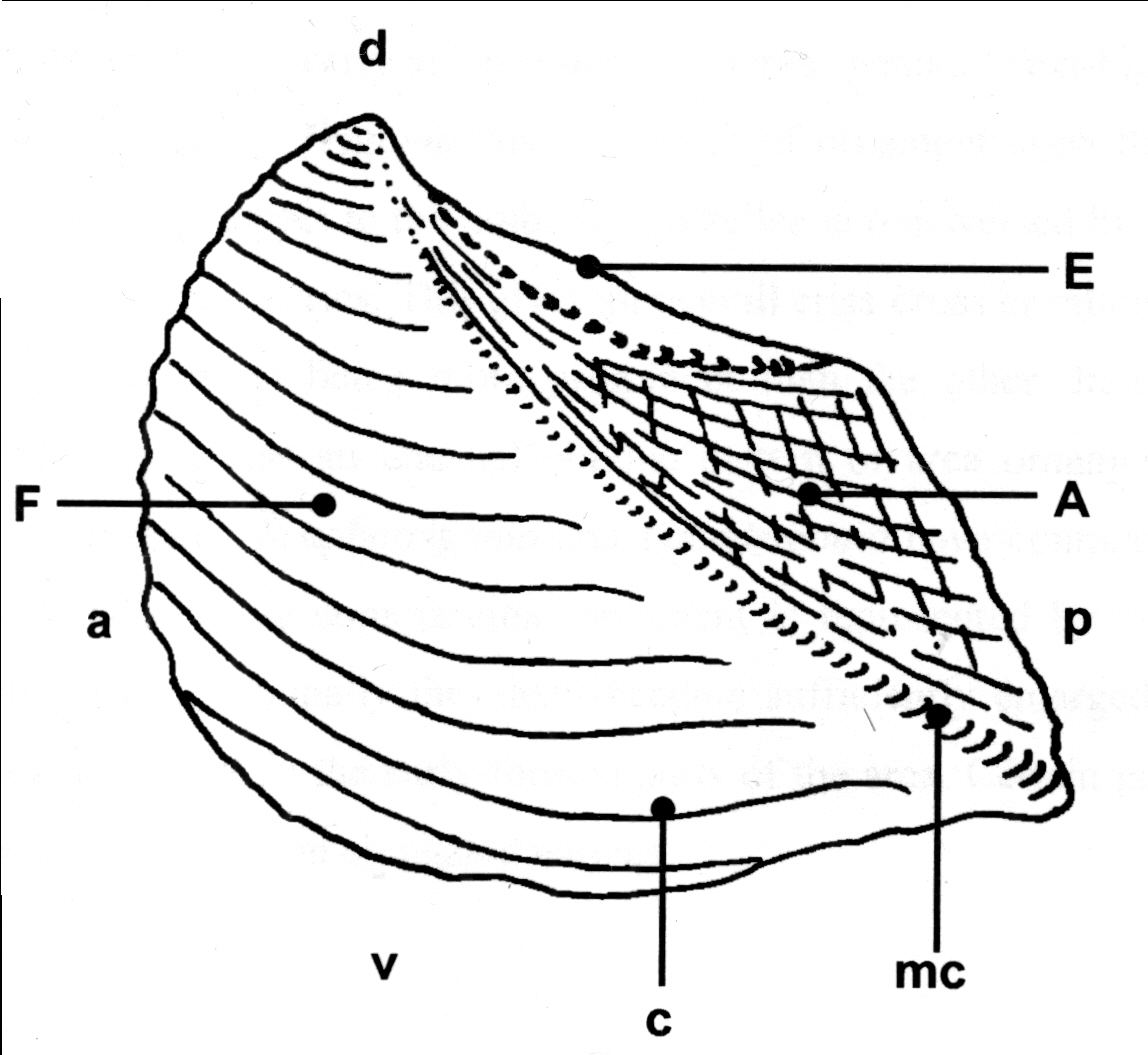
Diagram of Trigonia costata James Parkinson, showing main morphological features of the shell exterior; a) Anterior; p) Posterior; d) Dorsal; v) Ventral; F) Flank; A) Area; c) Costae; mc) Marginal Carina Trigonia costata ranges from the Lower Jurassic (Toarcian) to Middle Jurassic (Callovian).

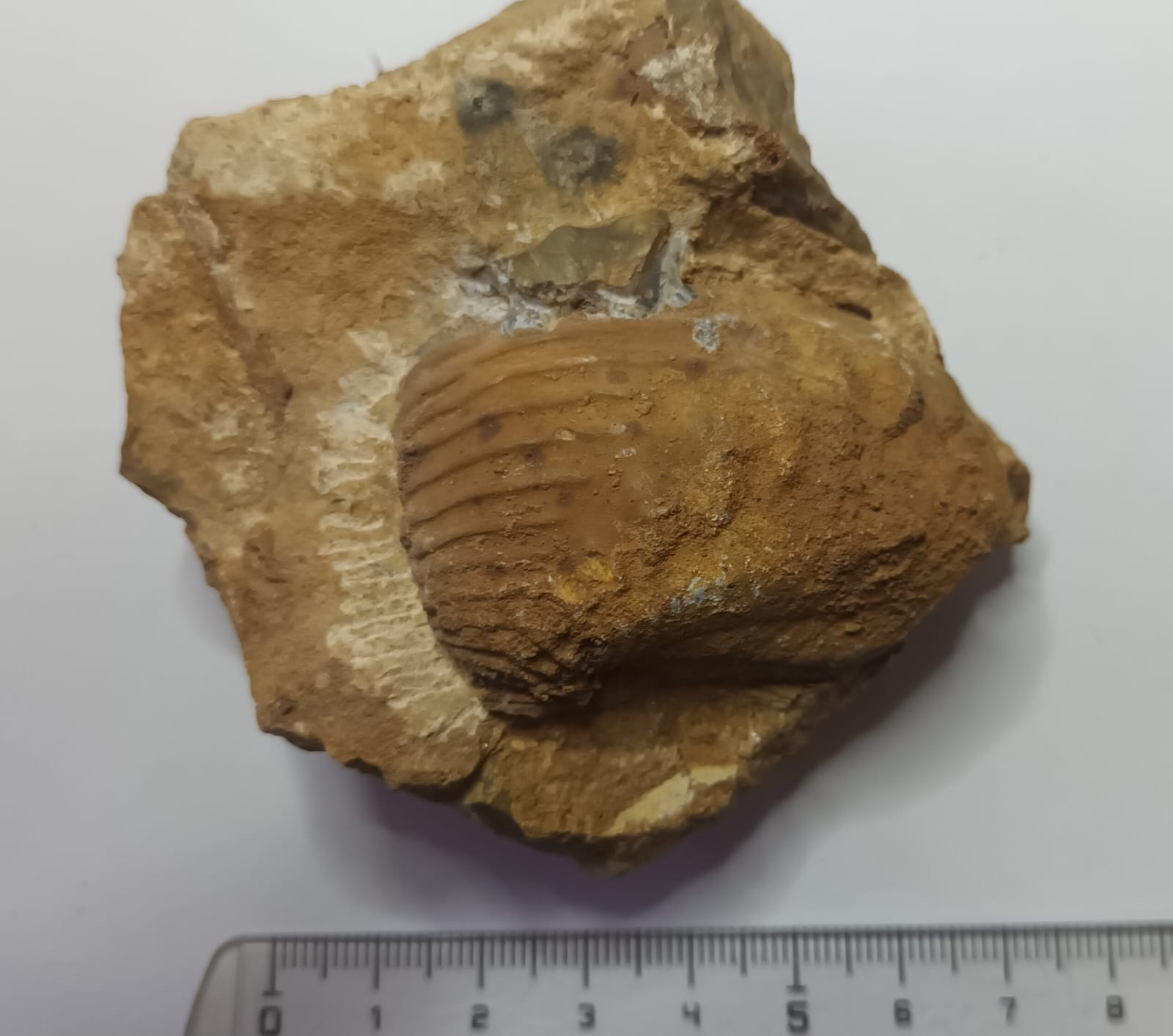
Trigonia sp. from the Jurassic of the Canjuers plateau, Var, France. Max Rouger Collection.

Trigonia is an extinct genus of saltwater clams, fossil marine bivalve mollusk in the family Trigoniidae. The fossil range of the genus spans the Paleozoic, Mesozoic and Paleocene of the Cenozoic, from 298 to 56 Ma.

== Description ==
The genus Trigonia is the most readily identifiable member of the family Trigoniidae, having a series of strong ribs or costae along the anterior part of the shell exterior. They are the first representatives of the family to appear in the Middle Triassic (Anisian) of Chile and New Zealand. The first European examples (Trigonia costata Parkinson) appear in the Lower Jurassic (Toarcian) of Sherborne, Dorset and Gundershofen, Switzerland.

== Species ==
The following Trigonia species have been described:

- T. analoga
- T. antiqua
- T. castani
- T. castrovillensis
- T. coqueiroensis
- T. costata
- T. cragini
- T. depauperata
- T. eufaulensis gabbi
- T. eufaulensis moorei
- T. guildi
- T. hemisphaerica
- T. imbricata
- T. interlaevigata
- T. intersitans
- T. kitchini
- T. maastrichtiana
- T. maloneana
- T. marginata
- T. mearnsi
- T. montanaensis
- T. orientalis
- T. papuana
- T. picteti
- T. plana
- T. pseudocaudata
- T. pseudocrenulata
- T. pullus
- T. rebouli
- T. reesidei
- T. resoluta
- T. reticulata
- T. saavedra
- T. semiculta
- T. somaliensis
- T. stantoni
- T. stolleyi
- T. suborbicularis
- T. sulcata
- T. taffi
- T. thierachensis
- T. undulatocostata
- T. vyschetzkii
- T. weaveri

== Distribution ==
Fossils of Trigonia have been registered in:

Permian

Bolivia (Copacabana Formation)

Triassic

Austria, China, Italy, the Russian Federation, United States (Alaska, Idaho), and Vietnam.

Jurassic

Afghanistan, Argentina, Canada (Alberta, British Columbia, Yukon), Chile, Colombia (Valle Alto Formation, Caldas), Egypt, Ethiopia, France, Germany, Greenland, India, Iran, Japan, Kenya, Luxembourg, Madagascar, Morocco, New Zealand, Poland, Portugal, the Russian Federation, Saudi Arabia, Somalia, Spain, Tanzania, Thailand, Tunisia, the United Kingdom, United States (Alaska, California, Idaho, Montana, Nevada, Oregon, Texas, Utah, Wyoming), and Yemen.

Cretaceous

Afghanistan, Algeria, Antarctica, Argentina, Armenia, Australia, Brazil, Bulgaria, Canada (British Columbia), Chile, Colombia (Yuruma Formation, La Guajira, Macanal Formation, Eastern Ranges), Egypt, France, Germany, Greenland, Hungary, Italy, Lebanon, Mexico, the Netherlands, New Zealand, Papua New Guinea, Peru, Portugal, Serbia and Montenegro, South Africa, Spain, Switzerland, Tanzania, Turkmenistan, Russian Federation, Ukraine, the United Kingdom, United States (Arizona, California, Delaware, Mississippi, New Jersey, North Carolina, Tennessee, Texas), Venezuela, and Yemen.

Paleocene

Argentina (Cerro Dorotea Formation)
