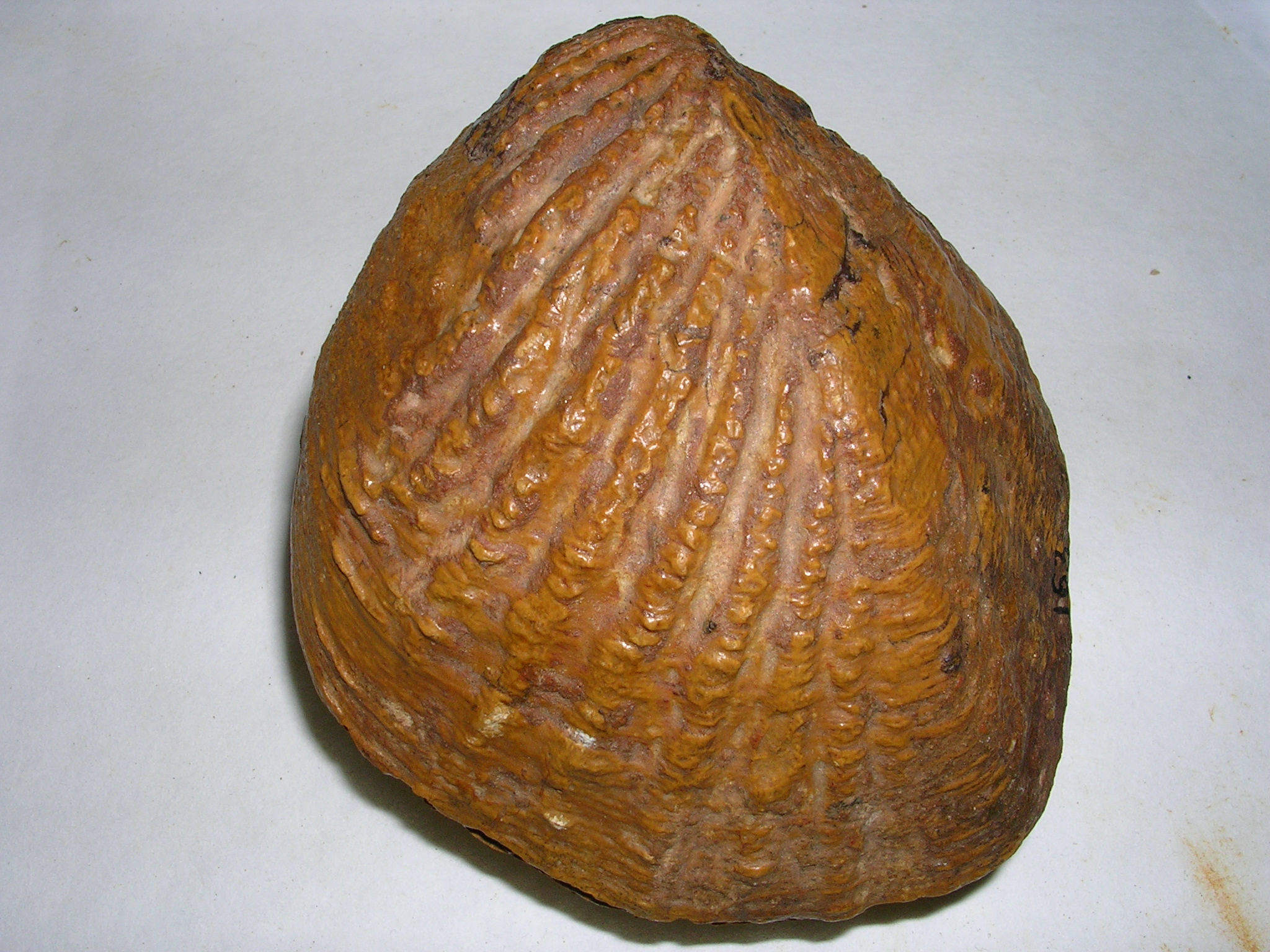
- Yaadia valentina

Scientific classification
- Kingdom: Animalia
- Phylum: Mollusca
- Class: Bivalvia
- Order: Trigoniida
- Superfamily: Trigonioidea; Lamarck, 1819

Families
- See text

= Trigonioidea =

Trigonioidea Temporal range: Devonian–Recent

Superfamily of bivalves

Trigonioidea is superfamily of medium-sized saltwater clams, marine bivalve molluscs. Within the fossil record the occurrence of this superfamily is widespread, ranging from the Devonian Period to Recent.

The diagnostic feature for the superfamily is the unique and complex dentition of the shell, (i.e. the interior hinge teeth that articulate the two valves). The dentition is particularly elaborate within the family Trigoniidae.

Bieler, Carter, & Coan (2010) included the following families in Trigonioidea. Taxa marked with a † are extinct.

Trigonioidea

- Trigoniidae Lamarck, 1819
- †Eoschizodidae Newell & Boyd, 1975 (syn: Curtonotidae)
- †Groeberellidae Pérez, Reyes, & Danborenea 1995
- †Myophoriidae Bronn, 1849 (syn: Cytherodontidae, Costatoriidae, Gruenewaldiidae)
- †Prosogyrotrigoniidae Kobayashi, 1954
- †Scaphellinidae Newell & Ciriacks, 1962
- †Schizodidae Newell & Boyd, 1975
- †Sinodoridae Pojeta & Zhang, 1984
