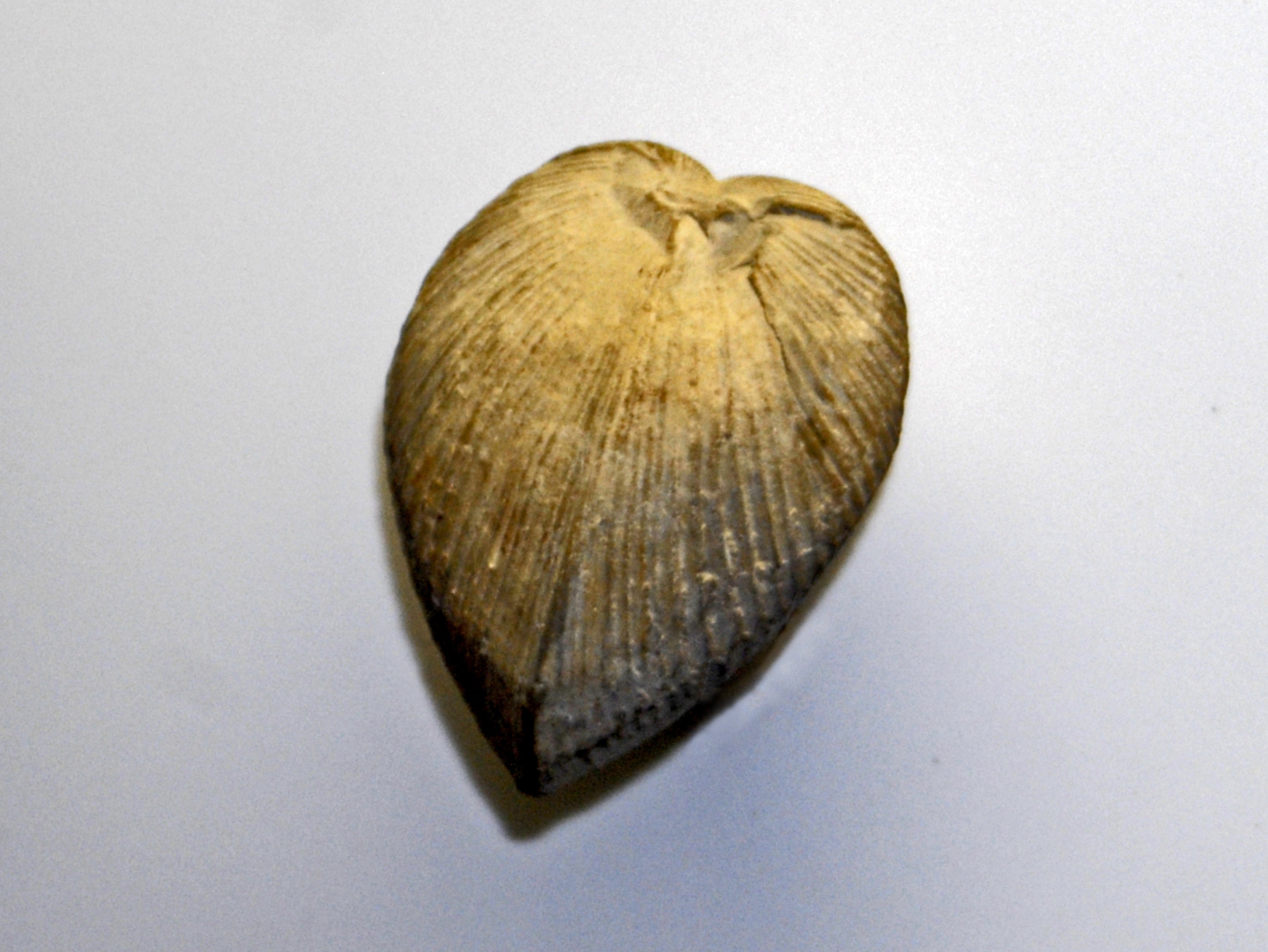
- Fossil specimen of Pholadomya scutata species from Jurassic deposits

Scientific classification
- Kingdom: Animalia
- Phylum: Mollusca
- Class: Bivalvia
- Family: Pholadomyidae
- Genus: Pholadomya; G. B. Sowerby I, 1823

Type species
- Pholadomya candida G. B. Sowerby I, 1823

Species
- See text

= Pholadomya =

Pholadomya Temporal range: Early Triassic–Recent ~251–0 Ma

Extinct genus of bivalves

Pholadomya is a genus of saltwater clams, marine bivalve molluscs in the family Pholadomyidae.

== Distribution ==
Fossil species within this genus lived during the Mesozoic era, in the opening South Atlantic, between present-day Brazil and Africa. In the Triassic of Argentina, Austria, Hungary and Italy fossils have been found. They are found in the Jurassic of the Coquina Group, La Guajira, Colombia among many other places. Of Campanian age, this genus is widespread as a fossil in Cameroon, France, Poland, Austria, Germany and the United States. Fossils up to the Neogene have been found in Belgium, the United Kingdom, and Venezuela (Pliocene Mare and Playa Grande Formations) and Miocene Bulgaria, Chile, Colombia, Cyprus, Germany, India, Japan, Malta, Moldova, New Zealand, Panama, Poland, Russia, Slovakia, Trinidad and Tobago and Venezuela. Today, only a single species, P. candida from the Caribbean is known to be extant.

== Species ==
Species within the genus Pholadomya include:

- Pholadomya candida Sowerby, 1823
- †Pholadomya maoria Dell, 1963
- †Pholadomya scutata
- †Pholadomya tumida
- †Pholadomya triquetra
- †Pholadomya texta
