= John Latendresse =

John Robert Latendresse (July 26, 1925, in South Dakota – July 23, 2000) was an American collector, known for being the "father of American cultured freshwater pearls". He left home at 13, and lying about his age, joined the U.S. Marines at 15, serving 38 months in the South Pacific during World War II. On his return he moved to Reno, Nevada, where he worked as a casino cashier.

Latendresse founded the Tennessee Shell Company in 1954 to supply the shell fragments used to seed pearls to pearl farmers overseas, later founding the American Pearl Company in 1961 to import pearls from Japan. He began experimenting with culturing pearls in the United States resulting in him becoming the first successful North American freshwater pearl farmer and he has been voted one of the pearl industry's most important people of the century.

Latendresse established the first experimental U.S. freshwater cultured pearl farm in Tennessee in 1963 which was unsuccessful; however, it became the foundation of the U.S. freshwater cultured pearl industry. After perfecting his techniques in the late 1970s, he went on to establish a further four farms. Latendresse also developed the technique for producing shaped pearls, which he called "fancishapes", which today are used by the American Pearl Company to produce shapes including coin, bar, navette, marquise, teardrop, cabochon and triangle.

The Tennessee River Pearl Farm has since been featured in a variety of national publications and television broadcasts including National Geographic (August 1985), Southern Living Magazine, Forbes (August 6, 1990), Audubon (March 1985), Smithsonian (January 1998), Town & Country (December 2002), National Geographic video - Splendid Stones (1991) and Sunday Morning News with Charles Osgood (Feb 2002).
