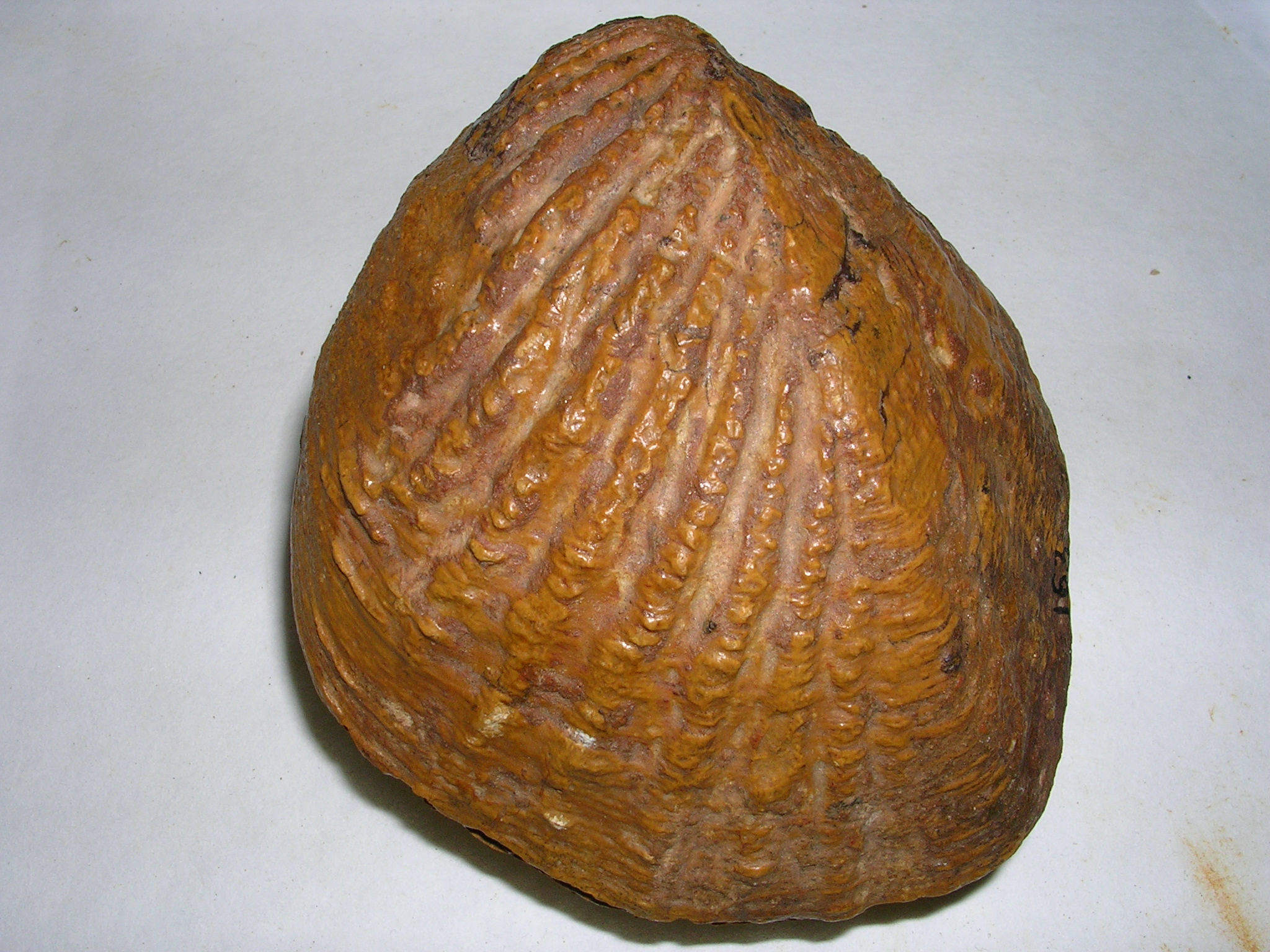
- Yaadia valentina

Scientific classification
- Kingdom: Animalia
- Phylum: Mollusca
- Class: Bivalvia
- Subterclass: Palaeoheterodonta
- Order: Trigoniida; Lamarck, 1819

Families
- See text

Synonyms
- Trigonioida

= Trigoniida =

Trigoniida Temporal range: Devonian–Recent

Order of bivalves

Trigoniida is an order of medium-sized saltwater clams, marine bivalve molluscs. Within the fossil record the occurrence of this order is widespread, ranging from the Devonian Period to Recent.

The diagnostic feature for the order is the unique and complex dentition of the shell, (i.e. the interior hinge teeth that articulate the two valves). The dentition is particularly elaborate within the family Trigoniidae.

Bieler, Carter, & Coan (2010) included the following families and superfamilies in Trigoniida. Taxa marked with a † are extinct with the only extant family in the order being Trigoniidae.

Trigoniida

- †Beichuanioidea Liu & Gu, 1988
  - †Beichuaniidae Liu & Gu, 1988
- †Megatrigonioidea Van Hoepen, 1929
  - †Megatrigoniidae Van Hoepen, 1929
  - †Iotrigoniidae Savelive, 1958
  - †Rutitrigoniidae Van Hoepen, 1929
- †Myophorelloidea Kobayashi, 1954
  - †Myophorellidae Kobayashi, 1954
  - †Buchotrigoniidae Leanza, 1993</small
  - †Laevitrigoniidae Savelive, 1958
  - †Vaugoniidae Kobayashi, 1954
- Trigonioidea Lamarck, 1819
  - Trigoniidae Lamarck, 1819
  - †Eoschizodidae Newell & Boyd, 1975 (syn: Curtonotidae)
  - †Groeberellidae Pérez, Reyes, & Danborenea 1995
  - †Myophoriidae Bronn, 1849 (syn: Cytherodontidae, Costatoriidae, Gruenewaldiidae)
  - †Prosogyrotrigoniidae Kobayashi, 1954
  - †Scaphellinidae Newell & Ciriacks, 1962
  - †Schizodidae Newell & Boyd, 1975
  - †Sinodoridae Pojeta & Zhang, 1984
