= Georgetown Formation =

Geologic formation in Mexico and also the United States

- Stratigraphic range: Albian
- Type: Formation
- Underlies: Del Rio Formation and Grayson Formation
- Overlies: Salmon Peak Formation and Stuart City Formation

Location
- Country: Mexico and the United States
- Extent: Texas

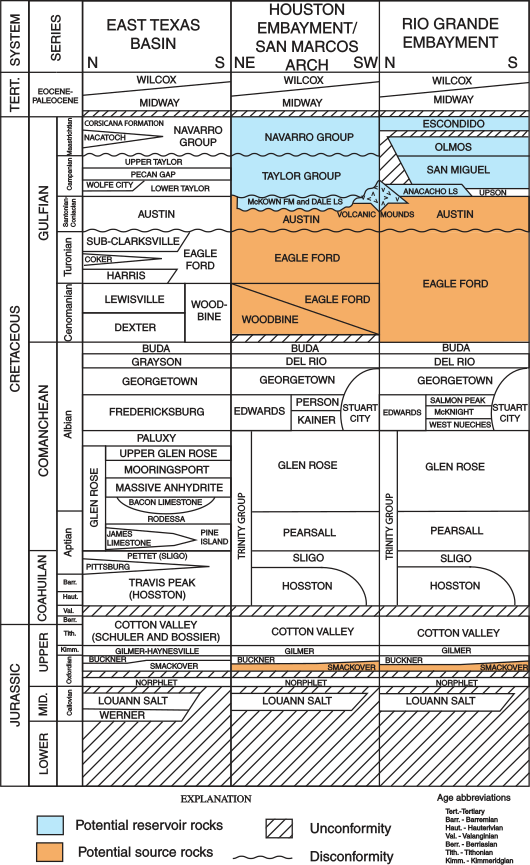
Georgetown Formation stratigraphic column in Texas

The Georgetown Formation is a geologic formation in Mexico and the United States. It preserves fossils dating back to the Cretaceous period.

A stratigraphic column at the Mount Bonnell location starts with the Lower Cretaceous Trinity Group overlain by the Edwards Group and the Georgetown Formation. Upper Cretaceous formations follow, starting with the Del Rio Clay, Buda Limestone, and then the Eagle Ford Group. Formations within the Trinity Group include the Hammett Formation, Cow Creek Formation, Hensel Formation, and Lower and Upper Glen Rose Formation. The Hammett and the lower portion of the Upper Glen Rose act as confining units (or aquitard) for the Middle Trinity Aquifer. The Upper Glen Rose contains the Upper Trinity Aquifer, which appears to have intra-aquifer groundwater flow with the Edwards Aquifer as water levels are at the same elevation. Formations within the Edwards Group include the Kainier Formation and the Person Formation. The Upper Cretaceous rock units confine the Edwards Aquifer within the Edwards Group and the Georgetown Formation.

== See also ==
- List of fossiliferous stratigraphic units in Mexico
- List of fossiliferous stratigraphic units in Texas
