= Glen Rose Formation =

Geological formation in Texas, USA

- Stratigraphic range: Early Albian 113–108 Ma
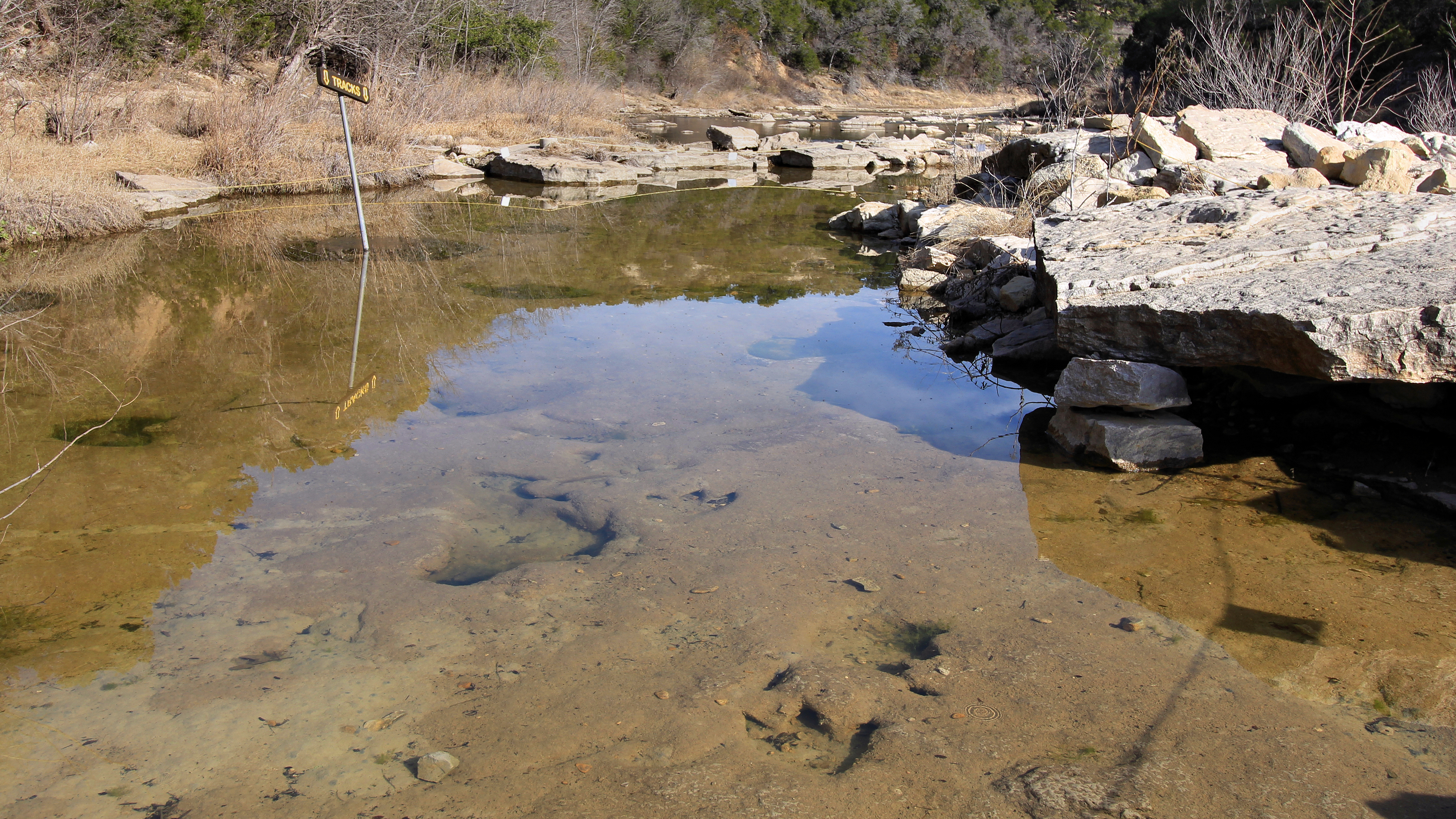
- The Glen Rose Formation at Dinosaur Valley State Park.
- Type: Geological formation
- Unit of: Trinity Group
- Underlies: Paluxy Formation, Stuart City Formation, and West Nueches Formation
- Overlies: Pearsall Formation and Twin Mountains Formation

Location
- Coordinates: 33.1°N 97.5°W
- Approximate paleocoordinates: 30.5°N 57.2°W
- Region: Texas
- Country: United States

Type section
- Named for: Glen Rose, Texas
- Named by: Robert T. Hill
- Year defined: 1891
- Glen Rose Formation (the United States) Glen Rose Formation (Texas)

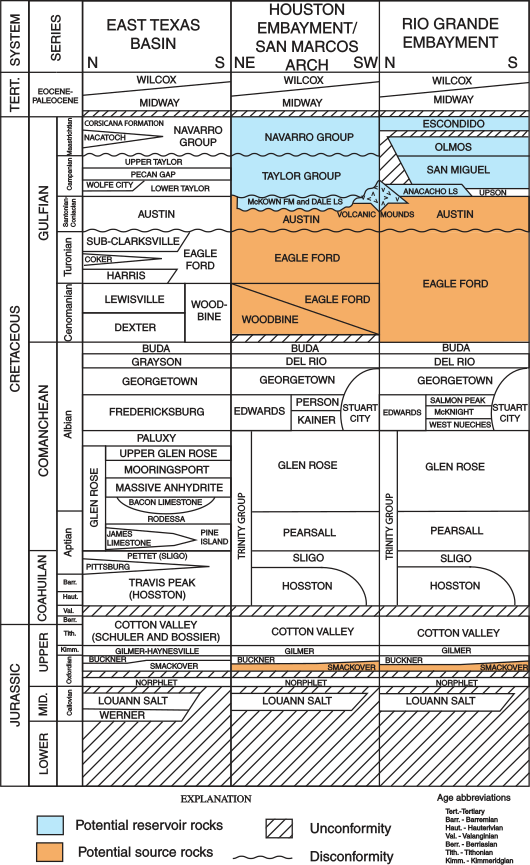
Glen Rose Formation stratigraphic column in Texas

The Glen Rose Formation is a shallow marine to shoreline geological formation from the lower Cretaceous period exposed over a large area from South Central to North Central Texas. The formation is most widely known for the dinosaur footprints and trackways found in the Dinosaur Valley State Park near the town of Glen Rose, Texas, southwest of Fort Worth and at other localities in Central Texas.

== Geology ==
The Glen Rose is the uppermost, thickest and most extensively exposed formation of the Trinity Group, a series of shallow-water marine formations deposited on a southeastward flank of the Llano Uplift, through a number of sea regressions and transgressions. Wells drilled in eastern Travis County have encountered over 1,000 feet of the Glen Rose. In the northern part, the Glen Rose is laterally continuous with the Paluxy Formation. The Glen Rose overlies the Hensel Sand and is overlain in turn by formations of the Fredericksburg division. In 1974, Keith Young concluded, based on ammonite zonation, that the formation ranges from late Upper Aptian into the Lower Albian, about 115-105 million years old.

The formation consists mostly of hard limestone strata alternating with marl or marly limestone, but is replaced by sandy facies shoreward (to the northwest). Because of the differing strengths of the layers, the limestone weathers to form a staircase profile on hills. Individual steps that form this distinctive stair-step topography extend for many miles without any apparent change in expression. These strata were originally referred to as the "Alternating Beds", which term included the overlying Fredericksburg formations.

The Glen Rose has been divided into upper and lower portions, separated by a one-foot layer of Corbula shells, a small bivalve.

The formation was named in 1891 for the town of Glen Rose, Texas, by paleontologist Robert T. Hill. The type locality is a near shore section exposed in the Paluxy River near the town of Glen Rose. The stratigraphy of the formation was most recently revised in a 1971 study.

A stratigraphic column at the Mount Bonnell location starts with the Lower Cretaceous Trinity Group overlain by the Edwards Group. Upper Cretaceous formations follow, starting with the Del Rio Clay, Buda Limestone, and then the Eagle Ford Group. Formations within the Trinity Group include the Hammett Formation, Cow Creek Formation, Hensel Formation, and Lower and Upper Glen Rose Formation. The Hammett and the lower portion of the Upper Glen Rose act as confining units (or aquitard) for the Middle Trinity Aquifer. The Upper Glen Rose contains the Upper Trinity Aquifer, which appears to have inter-aquifer groundwater flow with the Edwards Aquifer as water levels are at the same elevation.

== Caves and caverns ==
There are a number of caves in the Glen Rose, some of which are open to the public, including Cascade Caverns and Cave Without a Name, both in Kendall County, Texas and Natural Bridge Caverns in Comal County, Texas, the lower parts of which are in the Glen Rose.

== Fossil content ==
A variety of fossils are found in the Glen Rose, more abundantly in the lower Glen Rose than the upper, including numerous gastropods, clams and echinoids. Many species in the lower portion are not found in the upper portion. Dinosaur tracks have been found in many localities, as well as isolated vertebrate remains. Microfossils also are present, including one of the largest foraminifera ever found.

- Bivalves. A variety of fossil bivalves have been found, usually preserved as internal molds, with the exception of oysters, scallops and rudists, which have their shells present although mineralized. Some of the clams are large and round and have been given the popular name "heart clams." Fossil bivalves include a number of rudists which form reefs in the lower Glen Rose.
- Gastropods. Numerous gastropods are found in the Glen Rose, preserved as internal molds, the shells having dissolved away. Typical is Tylostoma, illustrated below.
- Corals. Corals formed reefs in the lower Glen Rose and a number of species of such corals have been described.
- Echinoids. A number of regular and irregular echinoids or "sea urchins" have been described from the Glen Rose. Salenia texana Credner and Heteraster obliquatus (Clark), illustrated below, are representative.
- Crabs. Over 10 species of decapod crustaceans or "crabs" have been described from the Glen Rose, the remains consisting of isolated claws and carapaces.
- Ammonites. A number of ammonites have been reported from the Glen Rose, although they are rare.
- Foraminifera. A variety of fossil foraminifera occur in the Glen Rose, including Orbitolina texana (Roemer), a giant (for forams) shell over a centimeter in diameter.
- Vertebrates.

Dinosaur footprints and trackways occur in a number of localities in the Glen Rose. See discussion below. Fossil remains of vertebrates, however, are rare and include the following isolated finds:

- Acrocanthosaurus, an allosauroid theropod dinosaur (a few isolated bones).
- Pachycheilosuchus, a mesoeucrocodylian or extinct crocodyle-like reptile.
- An indeterminate titanosauriform.
- Tenontosaurus, an iguanodontid dinosaur
- Sauroposeidon, a sauropod dinosaur
- Radiodactylus, an azhdarchoid pterosaur

- Plants

- Algae. Porocystis globularis is the name given to a dimpled grape-shaped object common in the Glen Rose. Scientists have disagreed over its classification, but now believe it to be an algal fruiting body.

- Cycads. Cycads have been found in the Glen Rose, primarily in the Paluxy Sands, and it has been stated that "[t]he Trinity beds must be ranked as one of the five great cycad-yielding terraces of North America..."

== Gallery of typical Glen Rose fossils ==
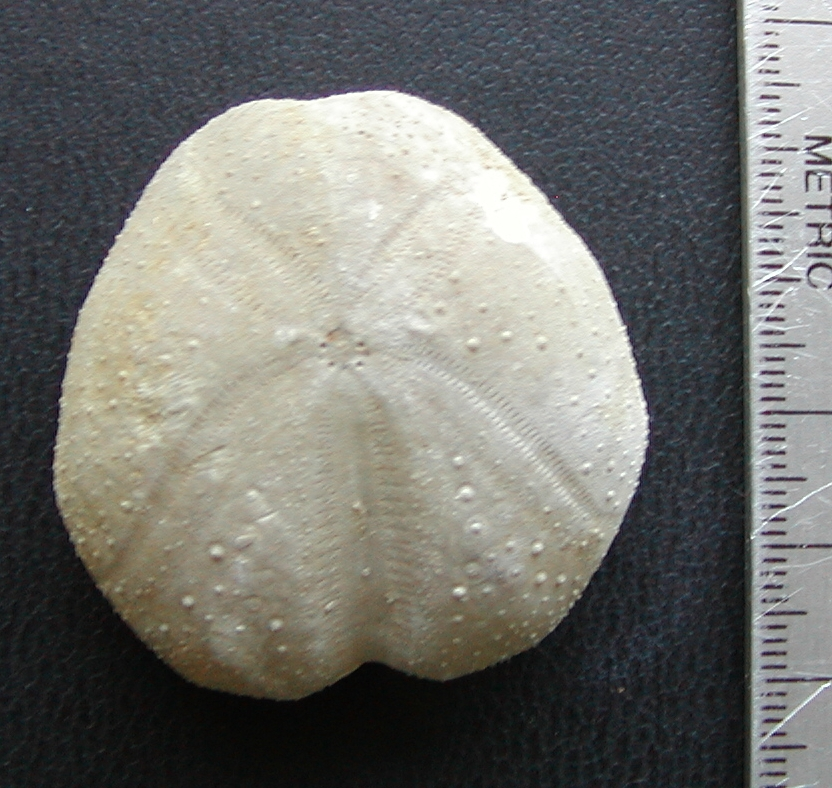
Heteraster obliquatus (Clark), an irregular sea urchin

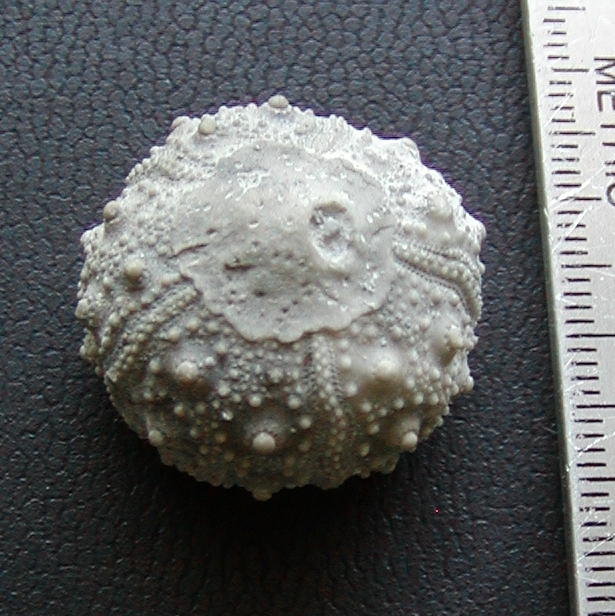
Salenia texana Credner, a regular sea urchin

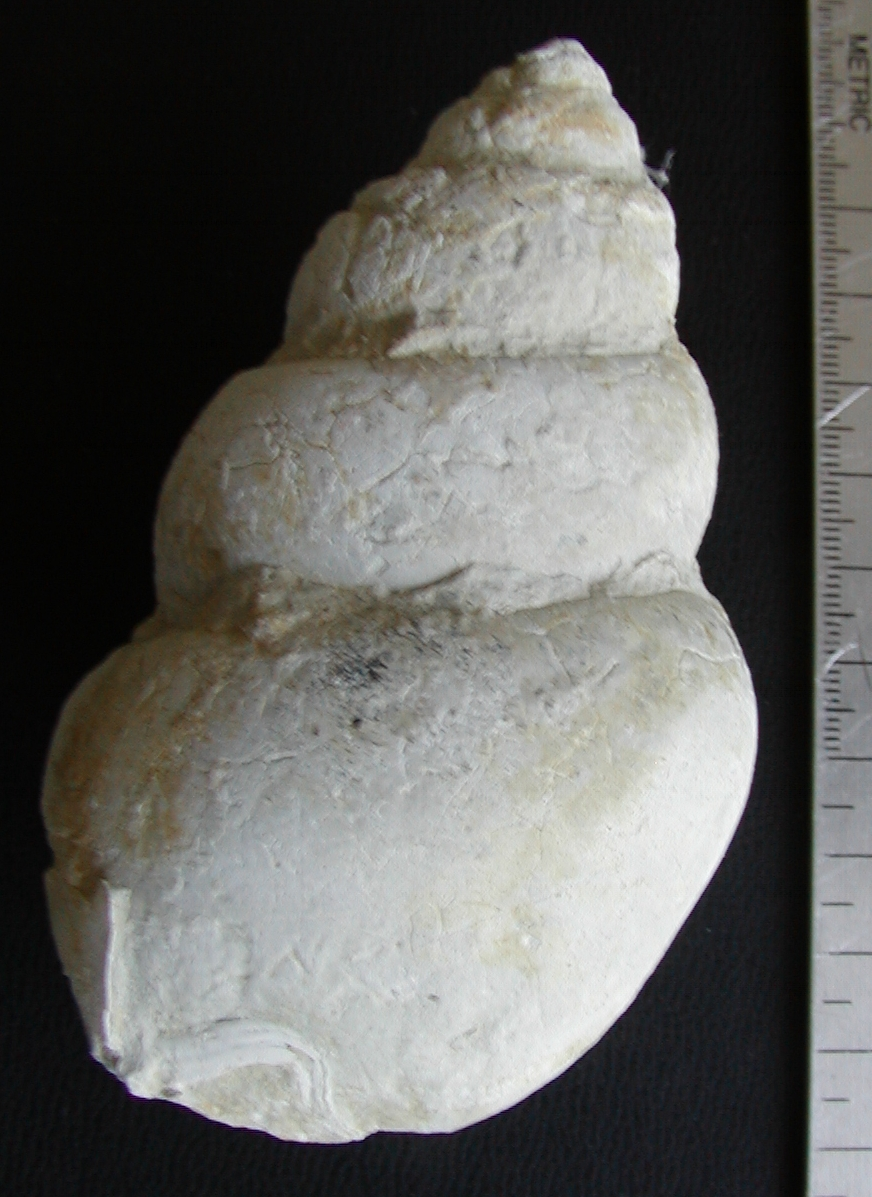
Tylostoma sp., a gastropod

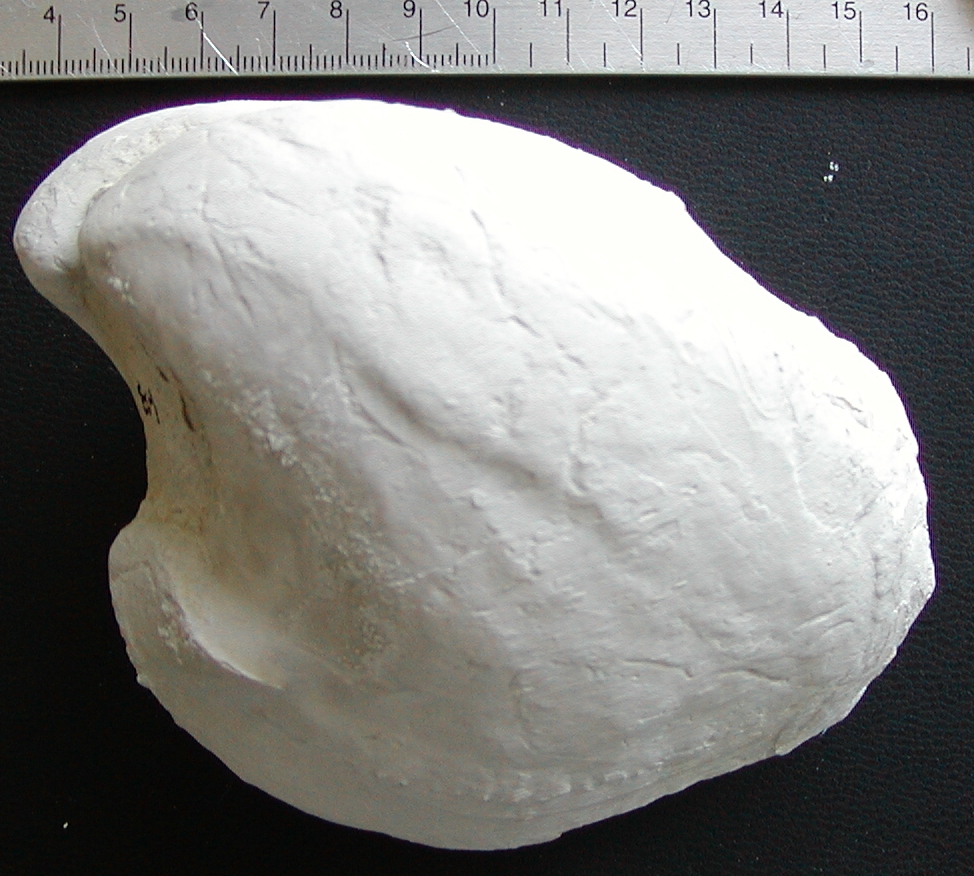
Arctica gibbosa (Giebel), a "heart clam" (bivalve)

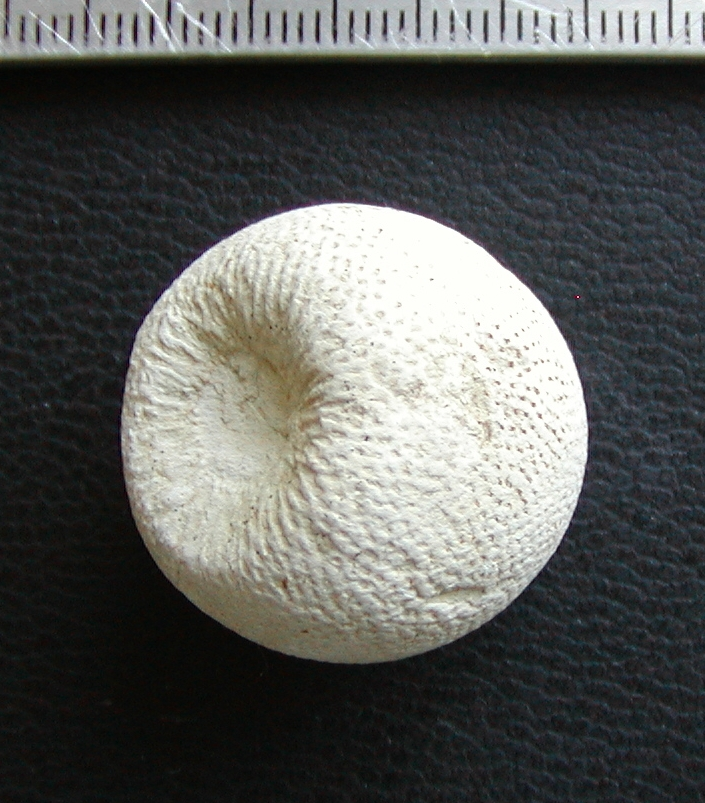
Porocystis globularis (Giebel), an algal fruiting body

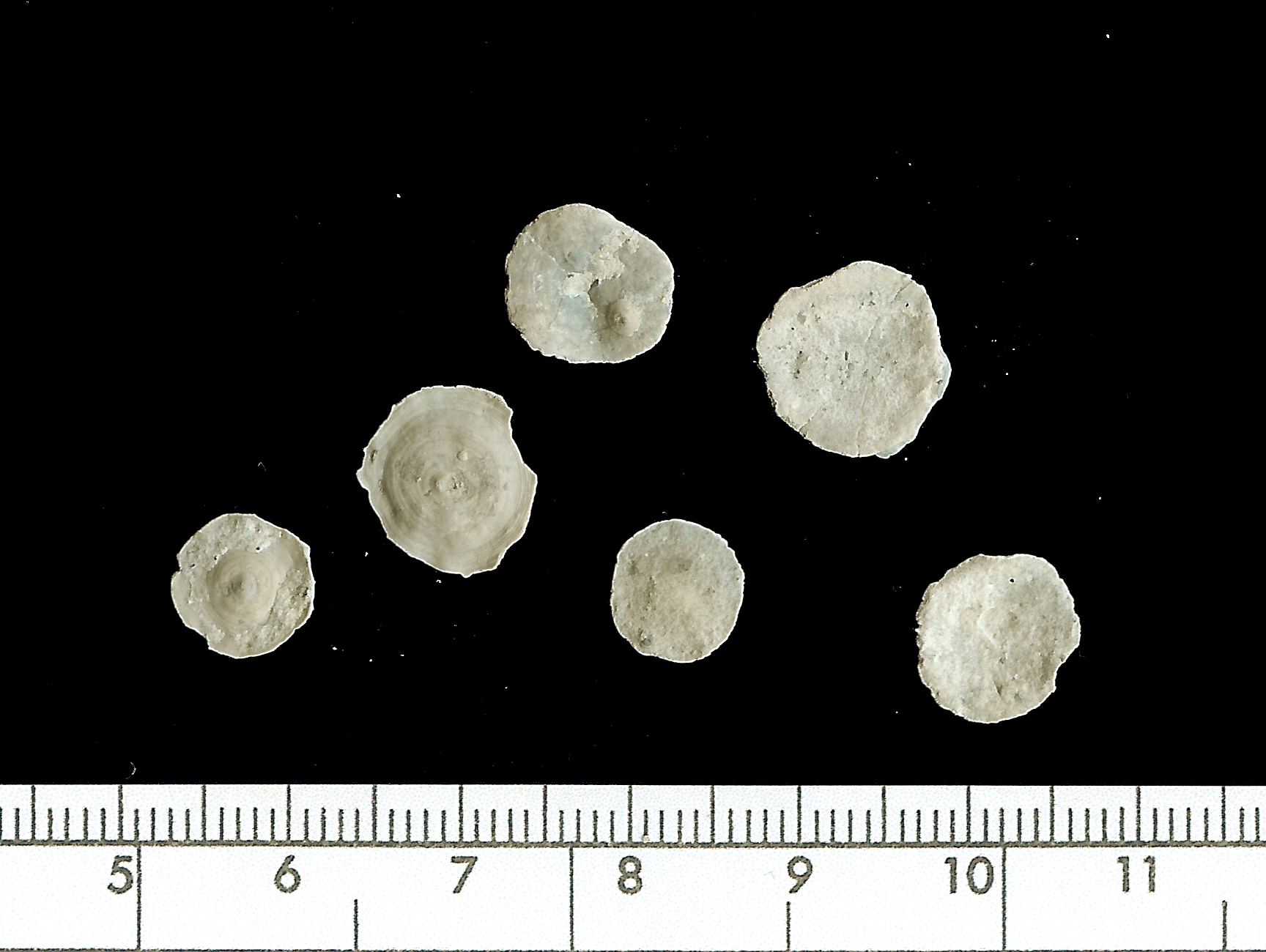
Orbitolina texana (Roemer), a one-celled foramanifera

== Dinosaur footprints and trackways ==
Dinosaur footprints and trackways are found in at least 50 localities in the Glen Rose, primarily at the top of the Upper Glen Rose and a smaller number at the top of the Lower Glen Rose. The most famous of these sites is the Paluxy River site in Dinosaur Valley State Park near the town of Glen Rose, Texas, southwest of Fort Worth. In 1938, Roland T. Bird, assistant to Barnum Brown of the American Museum of Natural History ("AMNH") in New York, New York, discovered a dozen sauropod and four theropod or carnosaur trackways all following the same general direction. These were the first sauropod footprints scientifically documented, and were designated a National Natural Landmark in 1969. Some are as large as about 3 feet (1 m) across. The prints are thought to have been preserved originally in a tidal flat or a lagoon. Large slabs of the trackways were excavated and are on display at the AMNH and the Texas Memorial Museum in Austin, Texas, among other institutions.

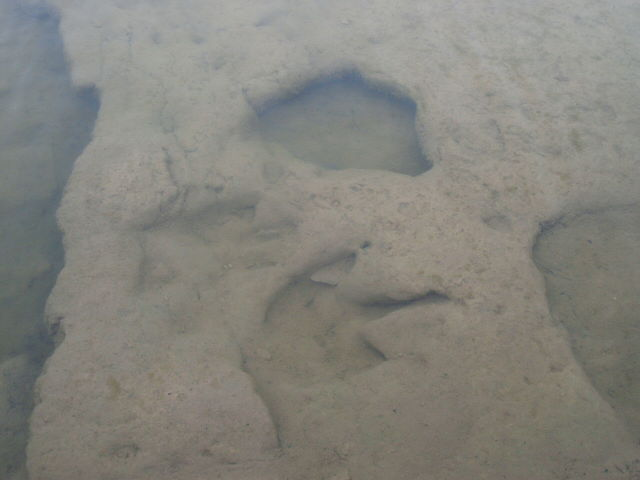
Theropod and sauropod tracks under water in the Paluxy River

The sauropod tracks, now given the ichnogenus name Brontopodus, were made by an animal of 30 to 50 feet in length, perhaps a brachiosaurid such as Pleurocoelus, and the theropod tracks by an animal of 20 to 30 feet in length, perhaps an Acrocanthosaurus. A variety of scenarios was proposed to explain the tracks. Some believed that they recorded a herd of sauropods, including young animals protected by their parents, being followed by a group of theropods and argued that the apparent disappearance of one of the sauropod trackways indicated a fatal attack by the theropods. Scientists today generally discount this explanation. Martin Lockley (1995) concludes that the tracks most likely represent twelve sauropods "probably as a herd, followed somewhat later by three theropods that may or may not have been stalking -- but that certainly were not attacking." Lockley notes that there are other similar group trackways and that the evidence sauropods moved in herds "in general, seems good." He takes issue, however, with Robert Bakker's theory that the Davenport Ranch trackway (another Glen Rose trackway) reflects large adults on the outside, protecting younger sauropods in the center, stating that the trackways merely show smaller animals following the larger ones. The fact that some of the Glen Rose trackways primarily include marks of the fore feet led Bird and others to suggest that the sauropods were semi-aquatic and made the tracks when partially swimming, a scenario that "has become deeply entrenched in the popular literature..." Again, Lockley discounts that theory, stating that the tracks were not well preserved or studied and that the view of sauropods as swimming "can not be supported using any convincing line of available evidence."

Claims that human footprints have been found in the Glen Rose is discussed in the Dinosaur Valley State Park article.

== See also ==
- Geology of Texas
- List of dinosaur-bearing rock formations
- List of topics characterized as pseudoscience
