= Mount Bonnell =

Hilltop and park in Austin, Texas

- Covert Park at Mount Bonnell
- U.S. National Register of Historic Places
- Recorded Texas Historic Landmark
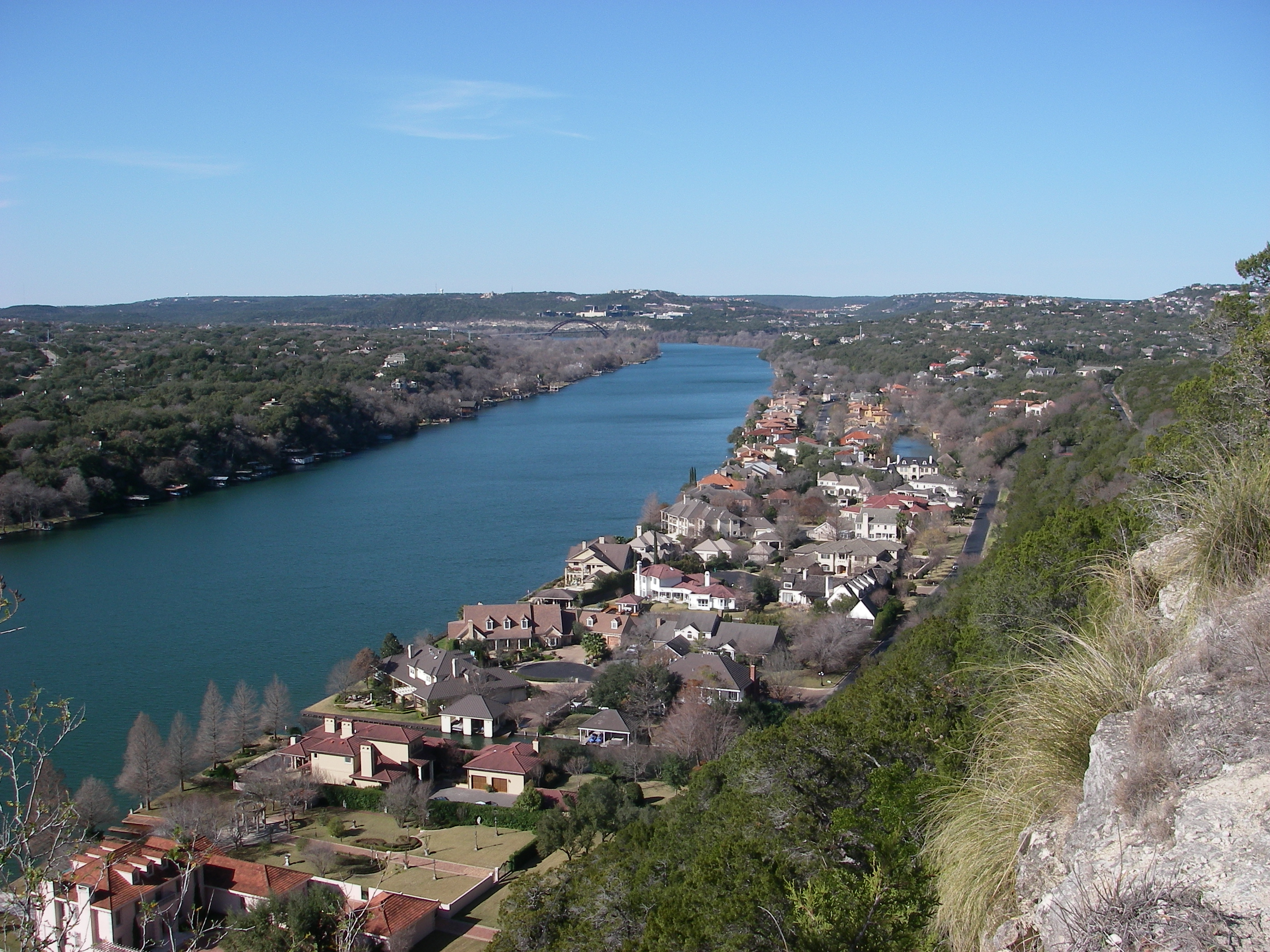
- View of Lake Austin from the summit of Mount Bonnell
- Location: 3800 Mount Bonnell Rd; Austin, Texas 78731
- Coordinates: 30°19′15″N 97°46′24″W
- Area: 5.36 acres (2.17 ha)
- Built: June 2, 1939
- NRHP reference No.: 15000619
- RTHL No.: 6473

Significant dates
- Added to NRHP: September 17, 2015
- Designated RTHL: 1969

Mount Bonnell /bəˈnɛl/, also known as Covert Park, is a prominent point alongside the Lake Austin portion of the Colorado River in Austin, Texas. It has been a popular tourist destination since the 1850s. The mount provides a vista for viewing the city of Austin, Lake Austin, and the surrounding hills. It was designated a Recorded Texas Historic Landmark in 1969, bearing Marker number 6473, and was listed on the National Register of Historic Places in 2015.

== Geography ==
Mount Bonnell is often described as the highest point in Austin, with the elevation at its peak about 775 feet (236 m) above mean sea level (AMSL). If Mount Bonnell ever held this distinction, it was only because the city limits did not include the next summit to the north, Mount Barker, which has an elevation of about 840 feet (260 m) above mean sea level. City of Austin records, however, indicate that the city annexed for "full purpose jurisdiction" both Mt. Bonnell and Mt. Barker as part of the same parcel "on or before" 1951; Mt. Bonnell entered the city limits with its higher neighbor, Mt. Barker. Many other areas now in the city of Austin are also higher than Mount Bonnell, but few publicly accessible spots offer such a sweeping view of the downtown area.

== History ==
=== Mount Bonnell's Indian Trail ===
A historical marker was placed at Mount Bonnell in 1969 by State Historical Survey Committee. The marker reads:

Rising 775 feet above sea level, this limestone height was named for George W. Bonnell, who came to Texas with others to fight for Texas independence, 1836. Was commissioner of Indian affairs in Republic of Texas under President Sam Houston. Moved in 1839 to Austin; there published the "Texas Sentinel", 1840. Member Texan-Santa Fe expedition, 1841. Was captured but released in time to join Mier expedition, 1842. Was killed in camp on Rio Grande, Dec, 26, 1842. Frontiersman W.A.A. "Bigfoot" Wallace killed an Indian he met face to face while crossing a narrow ledge 50 feet above river, 1839. He also took refuge in a Mount Bonnell cave to recover from "flux", but was missing so long his sweetheart eloped. In the mid-1800s Mormons built a mill on the Colorado river at foot of Mount Bonnell. Mill was destroyed by flood and the Mormons moved on west. Mount Bonnell was site of picnics and outings in 1850s and 1860s. As it is today. Legend has it that an excursion to the place in the 1850s inspired the popular song "Wait for the Wagon and We'll All Take a Ride". As a stunt in 1898, Miss Hazel Keyes slid down a cable stretched from the top of Mount Bonnell to south bank of then Lake McDonald below.

Years after Bigfoot Wallace's refuge in the cave on Mount Bonnell, when asked why he had chosen the cave as a refuge, he responded "Well the cave was right on the old Indian trail leading down to Austin ... and besides, the cave was in the best hunting ground for bear in all this country.."

=== Julia Lee Sinks ===
Julia L. Sinks, author and historian, was an early settler to Austin, arriving in the spring of 1840. Before meeting and marrying George Sinks, chief clerk of the Post Office Department during the Republic years, she lived on West Pecan, present day 6th street, and later wrote "Our home was on the beaten track of the Indians into town from the pass of Mount Bonnell. The knolls beyond the quarry branch were interspersed with timber, and sometimes though not often, we would see galloping past the open spaces beyond the blanketed Indian. The path along the quarry branch, secluded as it was, became their main inlet to the town. It was a sheltered road, never traveled at night by whites, so the Indians claimed right of way, and all full moons brought moccasin tracks in abundance".

=== Abduction of Simpson Children ===
If Mount Bonnell was on an Indian trail into Austin, it was also a trail out, as illustrated in another story included in Wilbarger's book, Indian Depredations of Texas. In 1842, a Mrs. Simpson living on that very same street as Julia Lee Sinks, West Pecan, about three blocks west of Congress, had two children – a daughter 14, a son 12—abducted by Indians while the children were in the adjacent "valley" (Shoal Creek). Wilbarger says that at that time there were no houses there. The Indians "seized the children, mounted their horses and made off for the mountains going in the direction of Mt. Bonnell". A posse was raised and gave pursuit. Wilbarger then says "At one time the citizens came within sight of the redskins just before reaching Mt. Bonnell, but the Indians, after arriving at the place, passed on just beyond to the top of the mountain, which being rocky, the citizens lost the trail and were never able to find where the savages went down the mountain". The Simpson girl was killed, but the boy survived and was later "traded off to some Indian traders, who returned him to his mother". It is because the boy survived and was returned home that we know what happened after the posse lost the trail of the Indians on Mount Bonnell. From Mt. Bonnell they stopped at Spicewood Springs, "which is situated in the edge of the mountains". This is where the Simpson girl was killed. Spicewood Springs is located about 5 miles north of Mount Bonnell, at the present day intersections of Mopac Expressway and Spicewood Springs Road.

=== Origin of the name ===
Mount Bonnell is generally believed to have been named after early Texas newspaper publisher George W. Bonnell, who moved to Texas in 1836. George W. Bonnell was publisher of the local paper The Texas Sentinel and was prominent in early Texas and Travis County (Austin) affairs after the War for Independence. Though sources have long credited George Bonnell as the mountain's namesake, Albert Sidney Johnston may have named Mount Bonnell in present-day Austin for his friend and fellow West Point graduate Joseph Bonnell, who was a captain in the Texas Army during the War for Independence. There is little contemporaneous evidence to support either derivation of the name.

Legend has it that Mount Bonnell was once called Antoinette's Leap, after a young woman who leaped to her death to avoid being captured by Native Americans who had killed her fiancé.

== Geology ==
Mt. Bonnell forms part of the Balcones Fault Escarpment and these "balconies" were first described by Bernardo de Miranda in 1756. The lower Cretaceous Glen Rose Formation limestone outcrops to the west of the fault zone but is buried 1000 feet to the east.

A stratigraphic column starts with the Lower Cretaceous Trinity Group overlain by the Edwards Group and the Georgetown Formation. Upper Cretaceous formations follow, starting with the Del Rio Clay, Buda Limestone, and then the Eagle Ford Group. Formations within the Trinity Group include the Hammett Formation, Cow Creek Formation, Hensel Formation, and Lower and Upper Glen Rose Formation. The Hammett and the lower portion of the Upper Glen Rose act as confining units (or aquitard) for the Middle Trinity Aquifer. The Upper Glen Rose contains the Upper Trinity Aquifer, which appears to have intra-aquifer groundwater flow with the Edwards Aquifer as water levels are at the same elevation. Formations within the Edwards Group include the Kainier Formation and the Person Formation. The Upper Cretaceous rock units confine the Edwards Aquifer within the group.

The Mount Bonnell fault has a vertical throw of up to 600 feet, making it the most prominent normal fault within the Balcones Fault Zone. During the Miocene, the Edwards Group was displaced downwards relative to the Glen Rose Formation on the Edwards Plateau, so that they are juxtaposed.

== Gallery ==
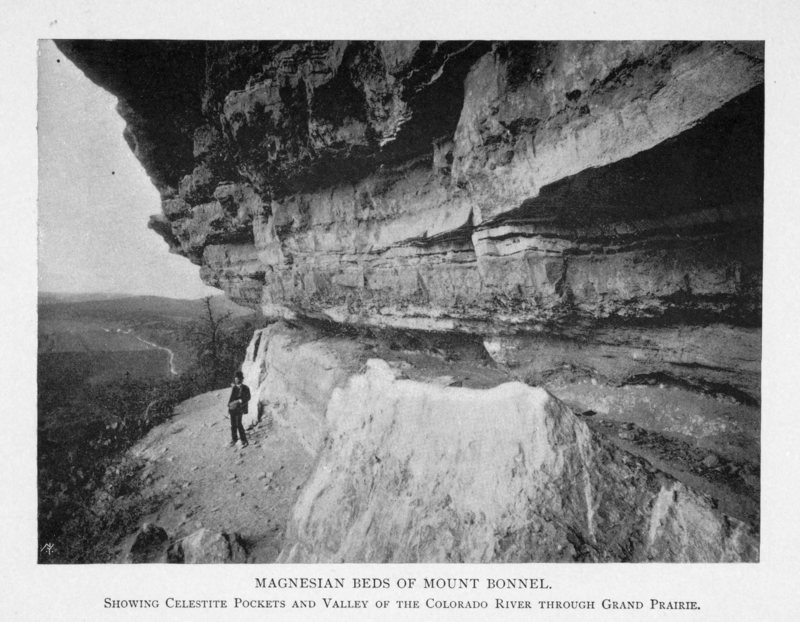
Outcrop at Mount Bonnell (Hill, 1889)

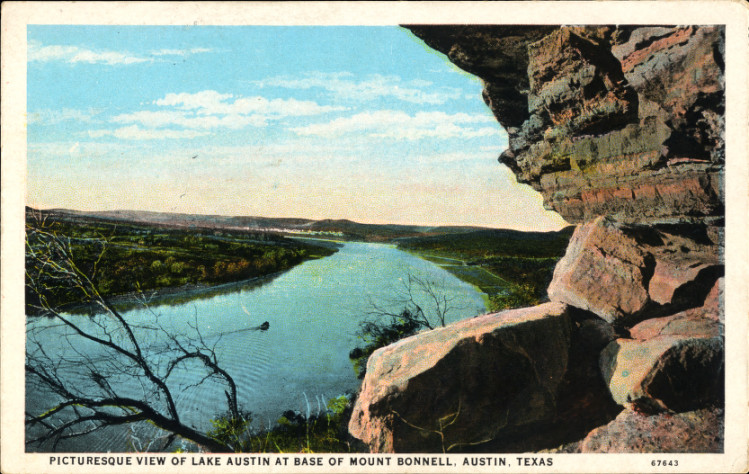
1917 postcard depiction of view from Mount Bonnell

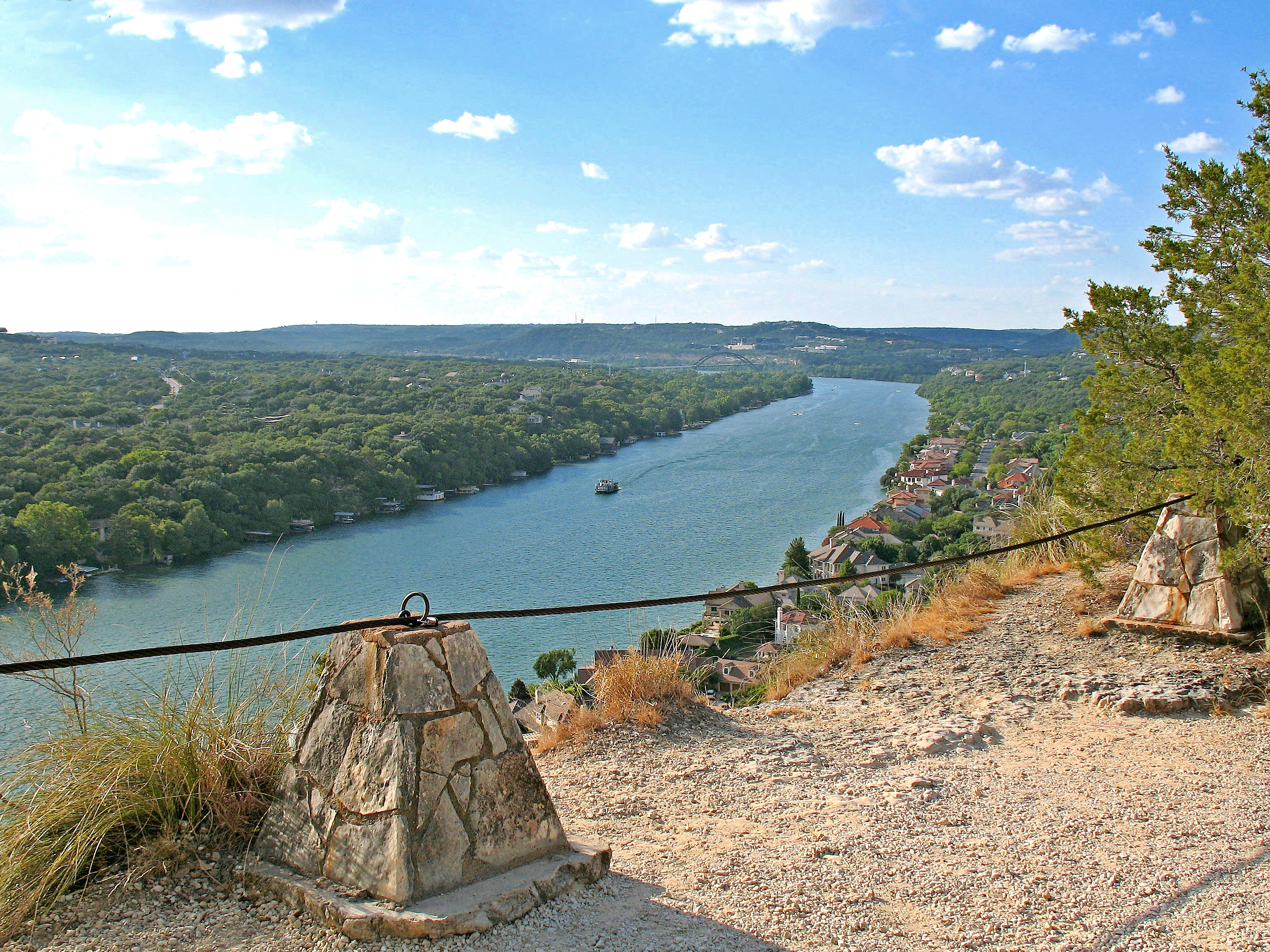
View from the summit

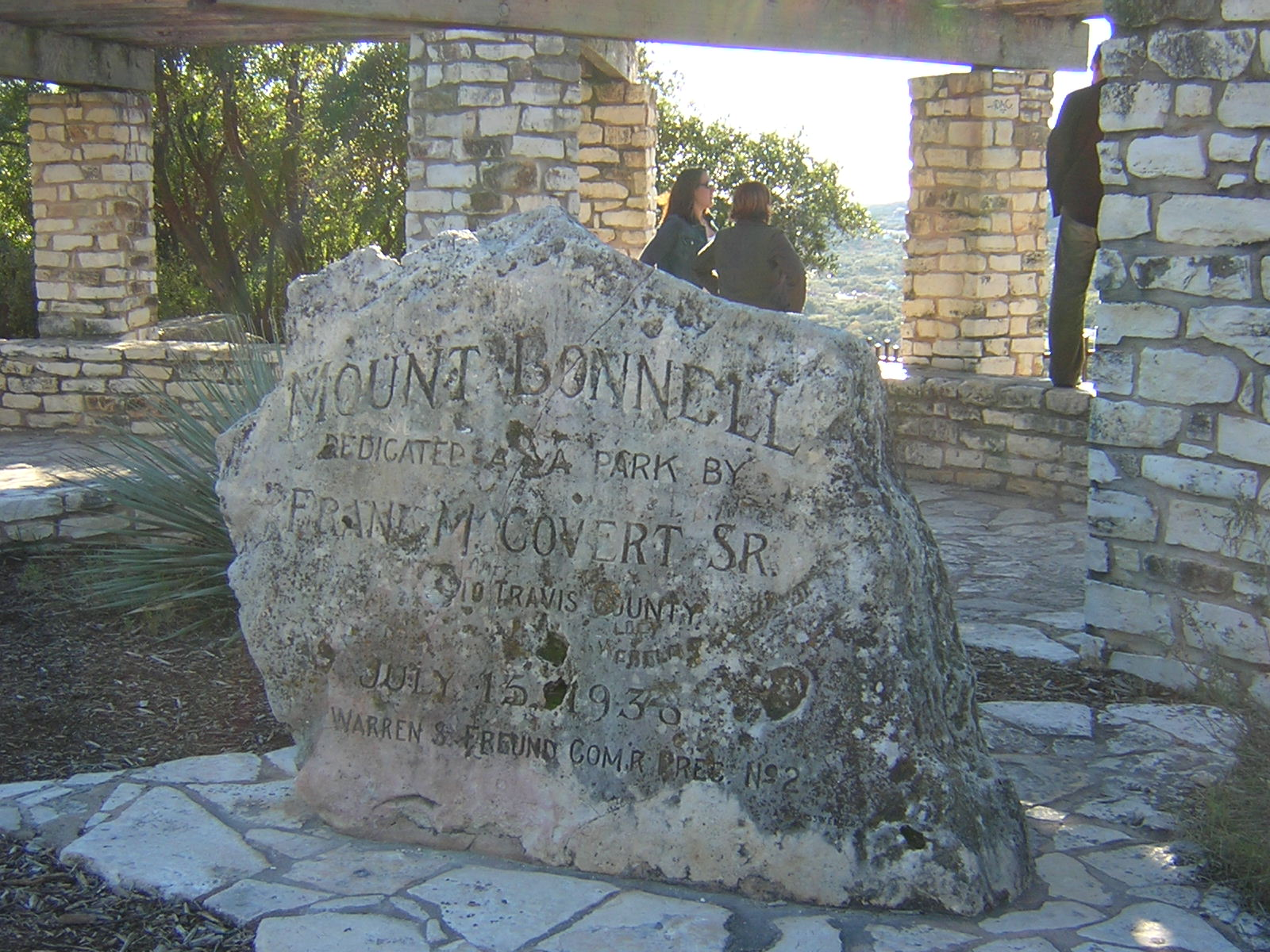
An engraved rock at the top of Mount Bonnell

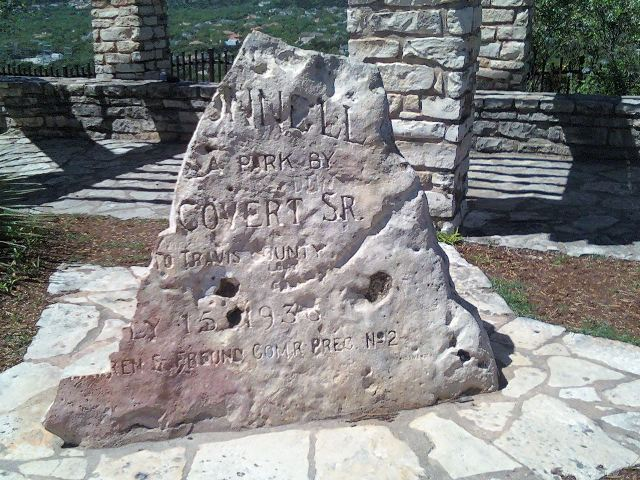
The engraved rock as it appears today

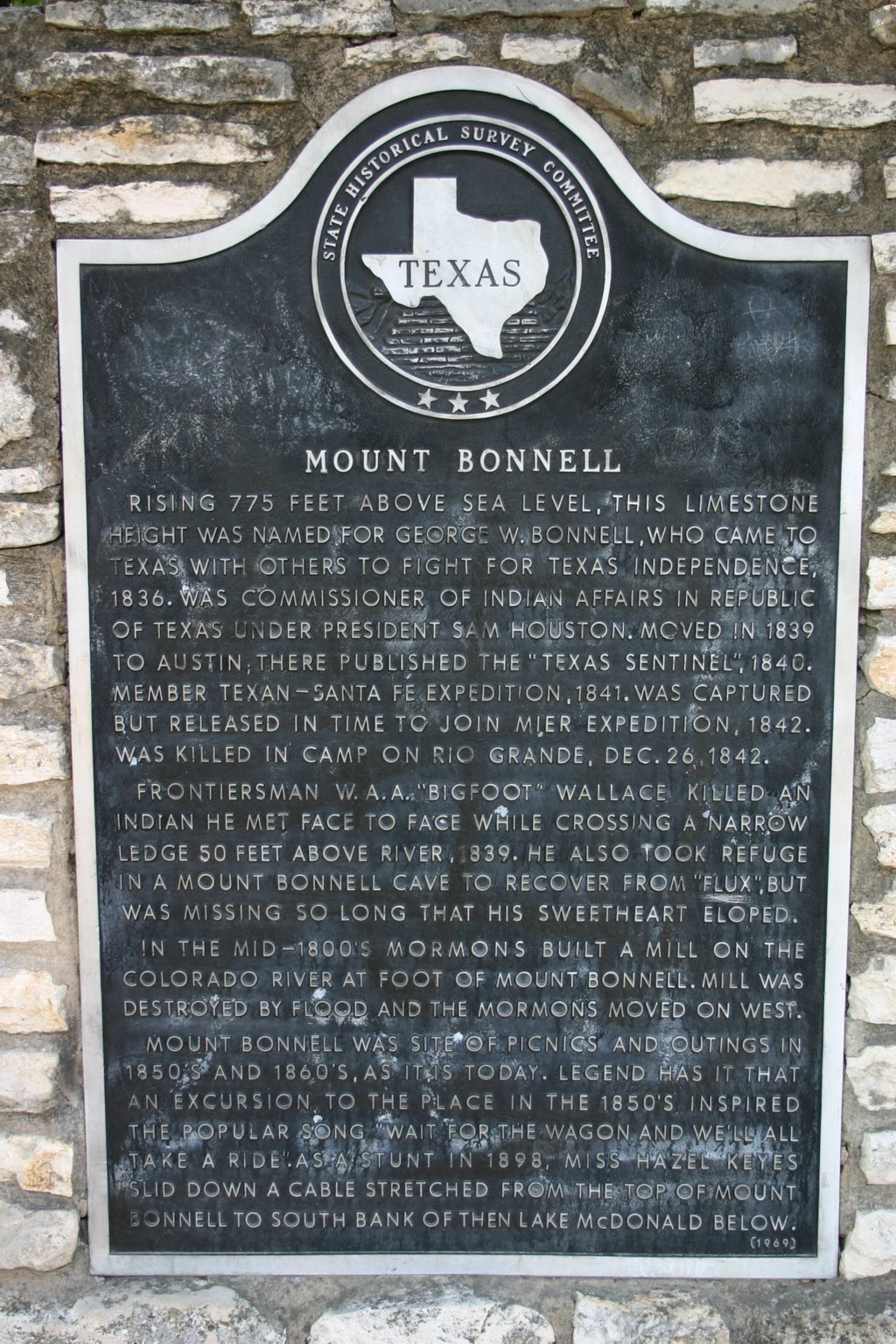
Texas Historical Marker at Mount Bonnell

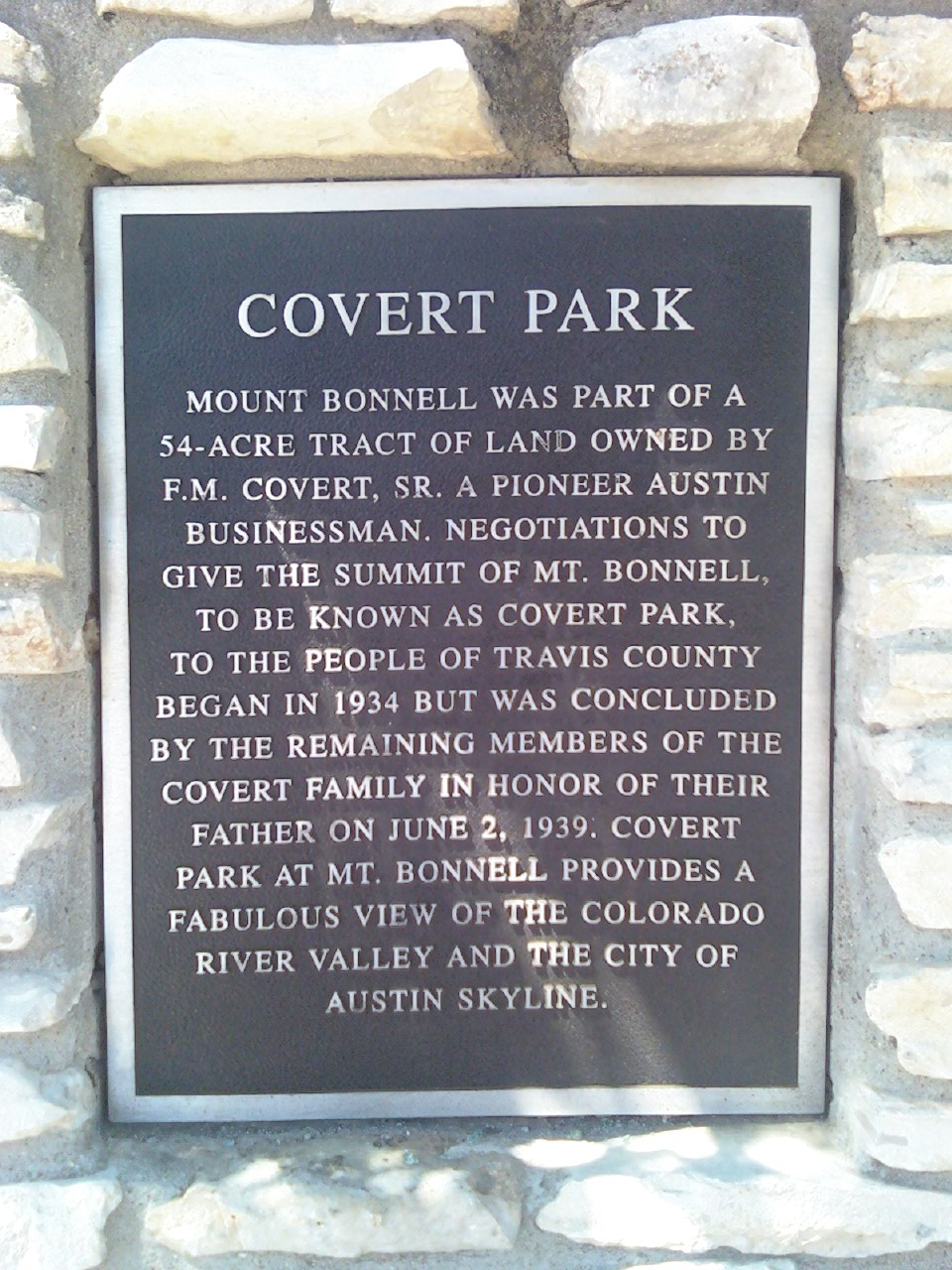
Covert Park Marker at foot of Mount Bonnell

== See also ==
- Balcones Canyonlands National Wildlife Refuge
- Barton Creek
- Texas Hill Country
- National Register of Historic Places listings in Travis County, Texas
