= Hensel Formation =

Mesozoic geologic formation in Texas

- Stratigraphic range: Albian
- Type: Geological formation

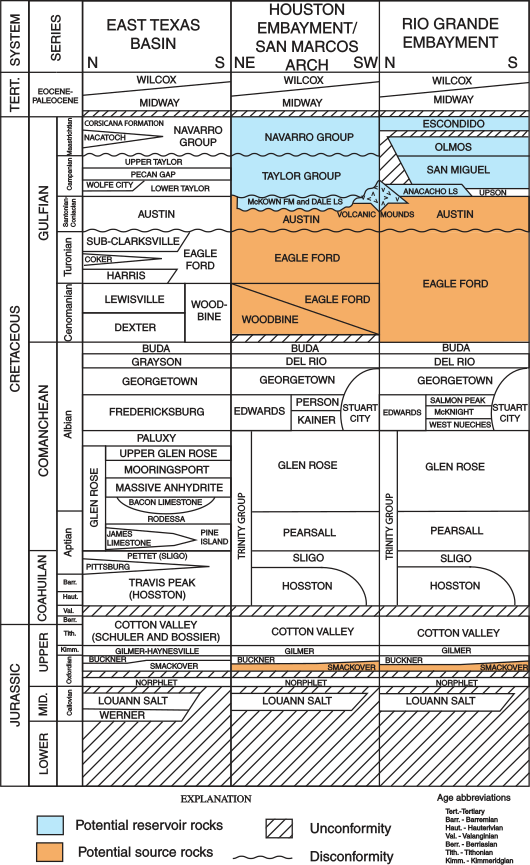
Trinity Group stratigraphic column in Texas

The Hensel Formation or Hensel Sand is a Mesozoic geologic formation in Texas. Fossil ornithopod tracks have been reported from the formation.

A stratigraphic column at the Mount Bonnell Fault location reveals the following sequence: the Lower Cretaceous Trinity Group is overlain by the Edwards Group. This is followed by Upper Cretaceous formations, starting with the Del Rio Clay, then the Buda Limestone, and finally the Eagle Ford Group. The Trinity Group consists of the Hammett Formation, Cow Creek Formation, Hensel Formation, and Lower and Upper Glen Rose Formation. The Hammett and the lower portion of the Upper Glen Rose act as confining units (or aquitard) for the Middle Trinity Aquifer.

== See also ==
- List of dinosaur-bearing rock formations
  - List of stratigraphic units with ornithischian tracks
    - Ornithopod tracks
- List of fossiliferous stratigraphic units in Texas
- Paleontology in Texas
