= Trinity Group (geologic group) =

- Stratigraphic range: late Aptian-early Albian, 115–106 Ma
- Type: Group
- Sub-units: Paluxy Formation; Glen Rose Formation; Twin Mountains Formation
- Underlies: Fredericksburg sands, Goodland Formation
- Overlies: Cotton Valley Formation

Location
- Region: Texas, Arkansas
- Country: United States

Type section
- Named for: Trinity Rivers, Texas
- Named by: Robert Thomas Hill

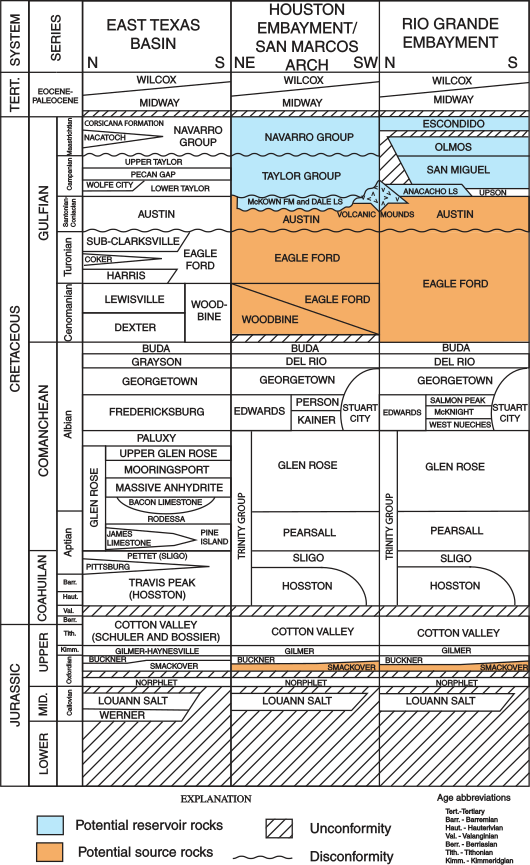
Trinity Group stratigraphic column in Texas

The Trinity Group is a group (sequence of rock strata) in the Lower Cretaceous lithostratigraphy of Texas, Arkansas, Mississippi, Louisiana and Oklahoma. It is named for the Trinity River of Texas.

A stratigraphic column at the Mount Bonnell Fault location starts with the Lower Cretaceous Trinity Group overlain by the Edwards Group. Upper Cretaceous formations follow, starting with the Del Rio Clay, Buda Limestone, and then the Eagle Ford Group. Formations within the Trinity Group include the Hammett Formation, Cow Creek Formation, Hensel Formation, and Lower and Upper Glen Rose Formation. The Hammett and the lower portion of the Upper Glen Rose act as confining units (or aquitard) for the Middle Trinity Aquifer. The Upper Glen Rose contains the Upper Trinity Aquifer, which appears to have intra-aquifer groundwater flow with the Edwards Aquifer as water levels are at the same elevation.

== Vertebrate fauna ==
=== Crocodylomorphs ===
Crocodylomorphs reported from the Trinity Group
| Genus | Species | Location | Stratigraphic position | Material | Notes |
|---|---|---|---|---|---|
| Pachycheilosuchus | P. trinquei | | Glen Rose Formation | | A neosuchian related to Eusuchia. Had procoelous vertebrae. |
| Paluxysuchus | P. newmani | | Twin Mountains Formation | | A neosuchian related to Eusuchia |

=== Dinosaurs ===
Dinosaurs reported from the Trinity Group
| Genus | Species | Location | Stratigraphic position | Material | Notes |
|---|---|---|---|---|---|
| Acrocanthosaurus | A. atokensis | | Twin Mountains Formation | | A carcharodontosaurid |
| Arkansaurus | A. fridayi | | | | An ornithomimosaur |
| Astrophocaudia | A. slaughteri | | Paluxy Formation | | A member of Somphospondyli |
| Cedarosaurus | C. weiskopfae | | Paluxy Formation | | A brachiosaurid |
| Paluxysaurus | P. jonesi | | Twin Mountains Formation | | Junior synonym of Sauroposeidon proteles |
| Sauroposeidon | S. proteles | | Twin Mountains Formation | | A member of Somphospondyli |
| Tenontosaurus | T. dossi | | Twin Mountains Formation | | An iguanodont |
| Convolosaurus | C. marri | | Twin Mountains Formation | | A basal ornithopod |

=== Pterosaurs ===
Pterosaurs reported from the Trinity Group
| Genus | Species | Location | Stratigraphic position | Material | Notes |
|---|---|---|---|---|---|
| Radiodactylus | R. langstoni | | Glen Rose Formation | | An azhdarchoid pterosaur |
