= Woodbine Group =

Geological formation in Texas, United States

Woodbine Formation
- Stratigraphic range: Cenomanian 96 Ma
- Cross section of Dallas-Fort Worth Metroplex geologic formations
- Type: Geological formation
- Underlies: Eagle Ford Shale, Woodbine Formation
- Overlies: Buda Limestone, Kiamichi Formation
- Area: Texas to Oklahoma and Arkansas

Lithology
- Primary: Sandstone
- Other: Siltstone, mudstone

Location
- Region: North America
- Country: United States of America

Type section
- Named for: Woodbine, Texas
- Named by: Robert Thomas Hill
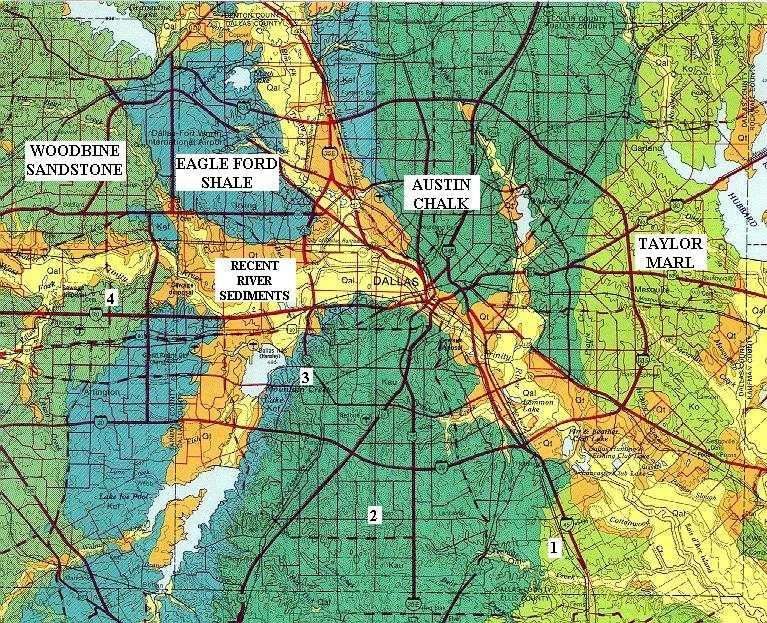
- Geologic map of Dallas, with Woodbine at left.

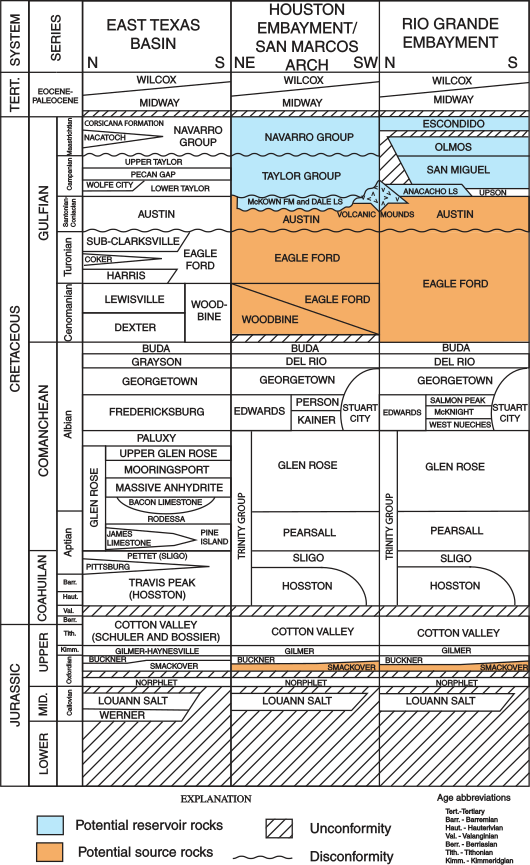
Woodbine Formation stratigraphic column in Texas

The Woodbine Group is a geological formation in east Texas whose strata date back to the Early to Middle Cenomanian age of the Late Cretaceous. It is the producing formation of the giant East Texas Oil Field (also known as the "Black Giant") from which over 5.42 billion barrels of oil have been produced. The Woodbine overlies the Maness Shale, Buda Limestone, or older rocks, and underlies the Eagle Ford Group or Austin Chalk. In outcrop the Woodbine Group has been subdivided into the Lewisville Sandstone, Dexter Sandstone, and/or Pepper Shale formations. Thin-bedded sands of the Woodbine and Eagle Ford are collectively referred to as the "Eaglebine" oil and gas play in the southwestern portion of the East Texas region.

Dinosaur and crocodilian remains are among the fossils that have been recovered from the formation. This fossil formation preserves organisms that were endemic to Appalachia.

The Woodbine Group was first mapped and named by Robert T. Hill, known as the "Father of Texas Geology", for outcrops near the small town of Woodbine, Texas in 1901. The Woodbine represents ancient river and delta systems that originated from erosion of the Ouachita Uplift in modern-day Oklahoma and Arkansas and the Sabine Uplift in modern-day Texas and Louisiana. Sediments from these deltas flowed into the East Texas and Brazos Basins of the ancient East Texas shelf.

The Arlington Archosaur Site is a location in Arlington, Texas that currently excavates fossils from the Woodbine Group. It became available to access by the University of Texas at Arlington (UTA) in spring of 2008. UTA and the Dallas Paleontological Society have excavated at the site up to present day, where work continues.

== Vertebrate paleofauna ==
- Scolomastax sahlsteini: A paralligatorid endemic to Appalachia.
- Ampelognathus coheni: A small-bodied ornithopod
- Protohadros byrdi: "Partial skull, teeth, partial postcranium." A hadrosaur found in Flower Mound, Texas in the early 1990s.
- Woodbinesuchus byersmauricei: Lower jaw and a variety of postcranial elements, such as vertebrae, limb bones, shoulder and hip bones, and bony armor.
- Unnamed theropod
- Deltasuchus motherali: Parts of the upper skull, most likely the apex predator in its ecosystem.
- Terminonaris robusta: A pholidosaurid crocodyliform whose remains have been found in North America and Europe.
- Flexomornis howei: A enantiornithe bird.
- Pleurochayah appalachius: A recently described species of bothremydid turtle, which is also known as a side-necked turtle.
- Mawsonia sp., a giant Coelacanth known from Africa and South America, but fossils of the genus were described in 2021.
- Bardackichthys carteri: an ichthyodectiform fish.
- Indeterminate Nodosauridae.
- Indeterminate Carcharodontosauridae.
- Indeterminate Tyrannosauroidea.
- Indeterminate Ornithomimosauria.
- Indeterminate Dromaeosauridae.
- Indeterminate Troodontidae.
- Indeterminate Coelurosauria.

== Other fossils ==
Other vertebrate fossils that have been identified in the Woodbine include lungfish, fish, turtles, sharks, and coprolites containing bones. Invertebrate fossils found in the Woodbine include ammonites, Inoceramus, oysters, crustaceans, and agglutinated foraminifera.

- Necrocarcinus christinae: a podotreme crab.

== See also ==
- List of dinosaur-bearing rock formations
