= Paluxy Formation =

Geological formation in the United States

- Stratigraphic range: Early Cretaceous
- Type: Geological formation
- Unit of: Trinity Group
- Sub-units: Baum Limestone Member, Georges Creek Member, Lake Merritt Member
- Underlies: Walnut Formation (Fredericksburg Group)
- Overlies: Glen Rose Formation
- Thickness: up to 1,450 ft (440 m)

Lithology
- Primary: Sandstone, mudstone, limestone

Location
- Region: North America

Type section
- Named for: Paluxy, Texas
- Named by: Robert Thomas Hill

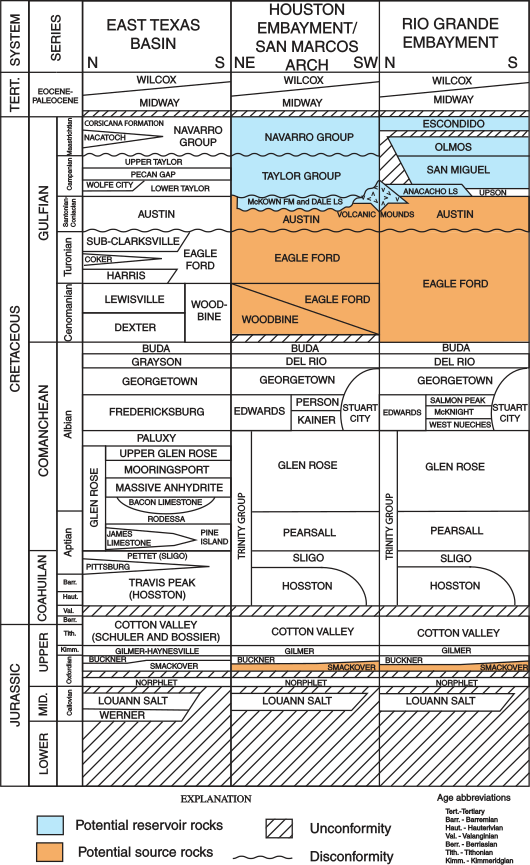
Paluxy Formation stratigraphic column in Texas

The Paluxy Formation is a geological formation found in Texas, Louisiana, Arkansas, Mississippi and Oklahoma, whose strata date back to the Early Cretaceous. Dinosaur remains are among the fossils that have been recovered from the formation.

== Vertebrate paleofauna ==
- Coelurosauria indet.
- Cedarosaurus weiskopfae
- Astrophocaudia slaughteri
- Nodosauridae indet.
- Tenontosaurus cf. tilletti

== See also ==
- List of dinosaur-bearing rock formations
