= Hammett Shale =

Geologic formation in Texas, United States

- Stratigraphic range: Aptian; ~120–112 Ma
- Type: Formation

Location
- Region: Texas
- Country: United States

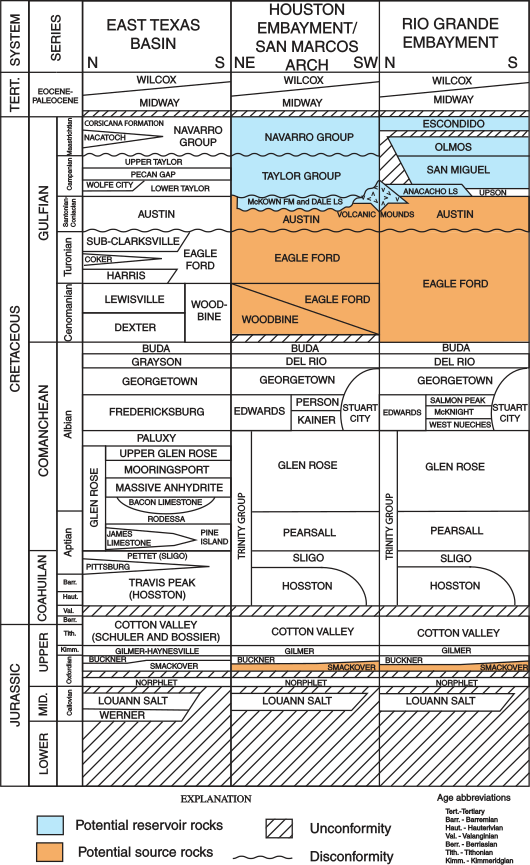
Trinity Group stratigraphic column in Texas

The Hammett Shale is a geologic formation in Texas. It preserves fossils dating back to the Cretaceous period.

A stratigraphic column at the Mount Bonnell Fault location starts with the Lower Cretaceous Trinity Group overlain by the Edwards Group. Upper Cretaceous formations follow, starting with the Del Rio Clay, Buda Limestone, and then the Eagle Ford Group. Formations within the Trinity Group include the Hammett Formation, Cow Creek Formation, Hensel Formation, and Lower and Upper Glen Rose Formation. The Hammett and the lower portion of the Upper Glen Rose act as confining units (or aquitard) for the Middle Trinity Aquifer.

== See also ==
- List of fossiliferous stratigraphic units in Texas
- Paleontology in Texas
