= Stuart City Formation =

Geologic formation in Texas, United States

- Stratigraphic range: Albian
- Type: Formation
- Underlies: Del Rio Formation and Georgetown Formation
- Overlies: Glen Rose Formation

Location
- Region: Texas
- Country: United States

The Stuart City Formation is a geologic formation in Texas. It preserves fossils dating back to the Cretaceous period.

== See also ==
- List of fossiliferous stratigraphic units in Texas
- Paleontology in Texas
