= Woodbine, Texas =

- Unincorporated community
- Location within Texas
- Coordinates: 33°36′37.40″N 97°0′56.24″W
- Country: United States
- State: Texas
- County: Cooke

Population (2000)
  - Total: 246
- Time zone: UTC-6 (Central (CST))
  - Summer (DST): UTC-5 (CDT)
- Area code: 940

Woodbine is an unincorporated community in Cooke County, Texas, United States. According to the Handbook of Texas, the community had a population of 246 in 1990. It is located within the Dallas-Fort Worth Metroplex.

== History ==
Woodbine was first settled in 1845, but it wasn't until R.C. Nelson, the community's first permanent resident, settled two miles north of its current site in 1864. It was officially founded in 1876 on W.H. Mitchell's land grant, who soon opened a store there. It was originally named Mineola by George Nelson, but soon changed its name to Woodbine in 1879 for its abundance of woodbine vines when the Denison and Pacific Railroad built a track through the community. A post office was established at Woodbine in 1879 and remained in operation until sometime after 1930. The settlement was the first in the county to receive rail service and a depot, resulting in its growth. The population was 113 in 1900 and remained at that level for more than 30 years. It went down to 50 in the 1940s, then to 20 in the late 1950s. However, its proximity to Gainesville caused the population to jump to 248 in the late 1960s, then was reduced by two in 1990.

The Woodbine Formation is a Cretaceous geologic formation named for the small community in 1905.

Woodbine had an all-female firefighting company in the 1960s.

On May 25, 1921, Woodbine had a branch of the Cooke County Library in its vicinity.

On April 6, 1955, an F3 tornado struck Woodbine, but no deaths were reported.

== Geography ==
Woodbine is located at the intersection of Farm to Market Roads 678 and 3164, 8 mi (13 km) east of Gainesville in east-central Cooke County.

== Education ==
Today, the community is served by the Callisburg Independent School District. The elementary campus is located in the community.
