= Del Rio Formation =

Geologic formation in Texas, United States

Del Rio Clay
- Stratigraphic range: Cretaceous
- Type: Formation

Location
- Region: Arkansas
- Country: United States

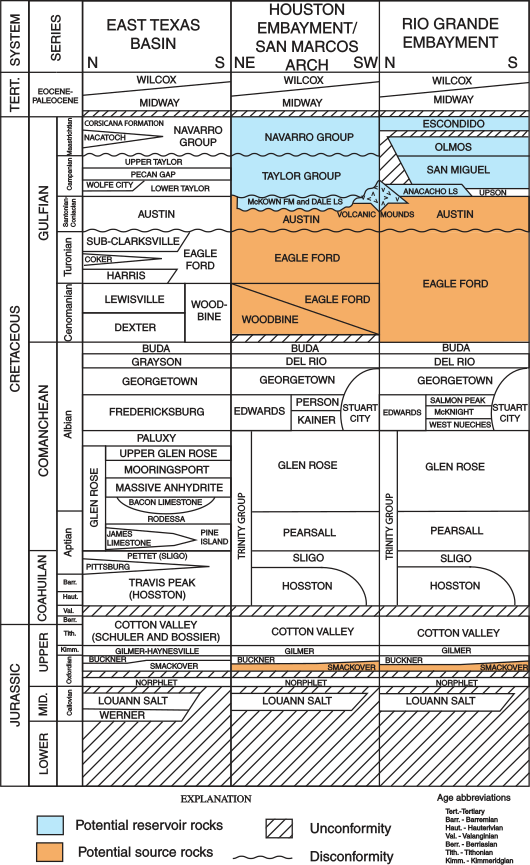
Del Rio Clay stratigraphic column in Texas

The Del Rio Formation of Clay is a geologic formation in Texas. It preserves fossils dating back to the Cretaceous period.

A stratigraphic column at the Mount Bonnell location starts with the Lower Cretaceous Trinity Group overlain by the Edwards Group and the Georgetown Formation. Upper Cretaceous formations follow, starting with the Del Rio Clay, Buda Limestone, and then the Eagle Ford Group. Formations within the Trinity Group include the Hammett Formation, Cow Creek Formation, Hensel Formation, and Lower and Upper Glen Rose Formation. The Upper Cretaceous rock units confine the Edwards Aquifer within the Edwards Group and Georgetown Formation.

== See also ==
- List of fossiliferous stratigraphic units in Texas
- Paleontology in Texas
