= Edwards Group =

Geologic group in Texas, United States

- Stratigraphic range: Cretaceous
- Type: Group
- Sub-units: Kainer Formation, Person Formation

Location
- Region: Texas
- Country: United States

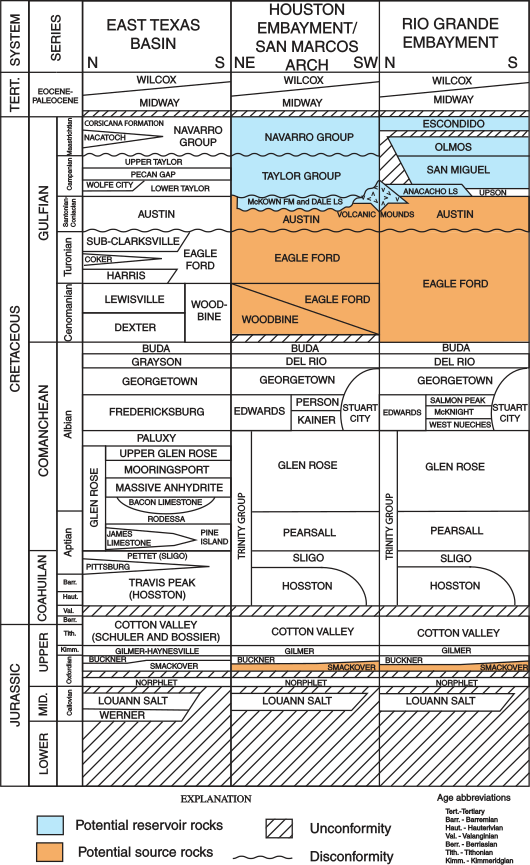
Edwards Group stratigraphic column in Texas

The Edwards Group is a geologic group in Texas. It preserves fossils dating back to the Cretaceous period.

A stratigraphic column at the Mount Bonnell Fault location starts with the Lower Cretaceous Trinity Group overlain by the Edwards Group. Upper Cretaceous formations follow, starting with the Del Rio Clay, Buda Limestone, and then the Eagle Ford Group. Formations within the Edwards Group include the Kainer Formation and the Person Formation. The Kainer Formation includes the Dolomitic, Kirschberg, and Grainstone Members.

== See also ==
- List of fossiliferous stratigraphic units in Texas
- Paleontology in Texas
- Edwards Aquifer
