= Robert T. Hill =

American geologist

Robert Thomas Hill
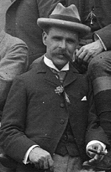
- Hill in 1897
- Born: August 11, 1858; Nashville, Tennessee, U.S.
- Died: July 20, 1941 (aged 82); Dallas, Texas, U.S.
- Education: Cornell University
- Known for: Geology of Texas
- Scientific career
- Fields: Geology, Stratigraphy

Robert Thomas Hill (August 11, 1858 – July 20, 1941) was a significant figure in the development of American geology during the late 19th and early 20th centuries. As a pioneer Texas geologist, Hill discovered and named the Comanche series of the Lower Cretaceous, and was a lifelong student of the structure and stratigraphy of the Cretaceous deposits of Central Texas and neighboring regions.

== Biography ==
Robert T. Hill was born on August 11, 1858, in Nashville, Tennessee. He was orphaned at the age of five during the American Civil War and then raised in the home of his grandmother. In 1874, at the age of 16, Hill boarded a train and traveled to where the tracks ended in east Waco, Texas. From there, he found his way to the frontier town of Comanche, Texas, located 89 mi (143 km) to the west of Waco, where he joined his brother, Joe, the editor of the Comanche Chief newspaper. Robert worked as a printer for the newspaper and performed various other duties, including writing and bookbinding, and eventually became co-editor of the paper.

During the summer of 1876, Hill joined a survey crew headed to the Rolling Plains between the eastern edge of the Llano Estacado and Fort Griffin, Texas. The work, although somewhat tedious at times, provided an opportunity for Hill to explore the "redbed country" of west-central Texas. This land of reddish-brown sediments and rock has been carved by years of erosion, leaving behind scenic mesas and buttes that preserve clues to the region's geologic past. In 1877, at the age of 19, Hill accepted an offer to work as a cowboy driving a large herd of cattle from Uvalde, Texas, to Dodge City, Kansas. The cattle drive took many months, during which time he learned to live outdoors for extended periods and developed frontier skills that proved valuable in his later years, as he worked as a field geologist.

Returning to work again at the Comanche Chief, Hill began to spend idle time exploring the local terrain. His interest in geology grew, as he took special interest in the many flat-topped mesas and buttes in the region. One butte in particular, named Round Mountain, was located only 6 mi (9.7 km) to the northwest of Comanche, and he often climbed to the top to enjoy the view. Although he had little knowledge of geology at this point, he found the fossils along its rocky slopes to be fascinating, so he began to collect specimens. Hill's collection of fossils grew and soon cluttered the window sills and filled the corners of the newspaper office.

Through a friend, Hill obtained a copy of Wilson's Fifth Reader that contained chapters on various subjects, including a chapter on geology. Hill studied this book, and the more he learned, the more he wanted to know about geology. He then ordered, through his local drug store, a copy of the Manual of Geology by James Dwight Dana, one of the leading geologists in North America. Hill carefully studied this book and attempted to place the local stratigraphy into Dana's scheme of classification. It became apparent that he was dealing with rocks and fossils that had not as yet been described by modern science. This discovery propelled Hill into a lifelong interest in the Cretaceous period – when Central Texas was covered by a shallow sea.

At some point, Hill recognized that the next logical step in his pursuit of geological knowledge was to attend university and obtain a proper education. Through his newspaper connections, Hill found acceptance at Cornell University, which allowed students to take a light course load and work their way through school. In February 1882, Hill left Comanche for Ithaca, New York, to study geology at Cornell. From 1882 through 1885, he worked his way through Cornell, where he received a bachelor of science degree in geology in 1887.

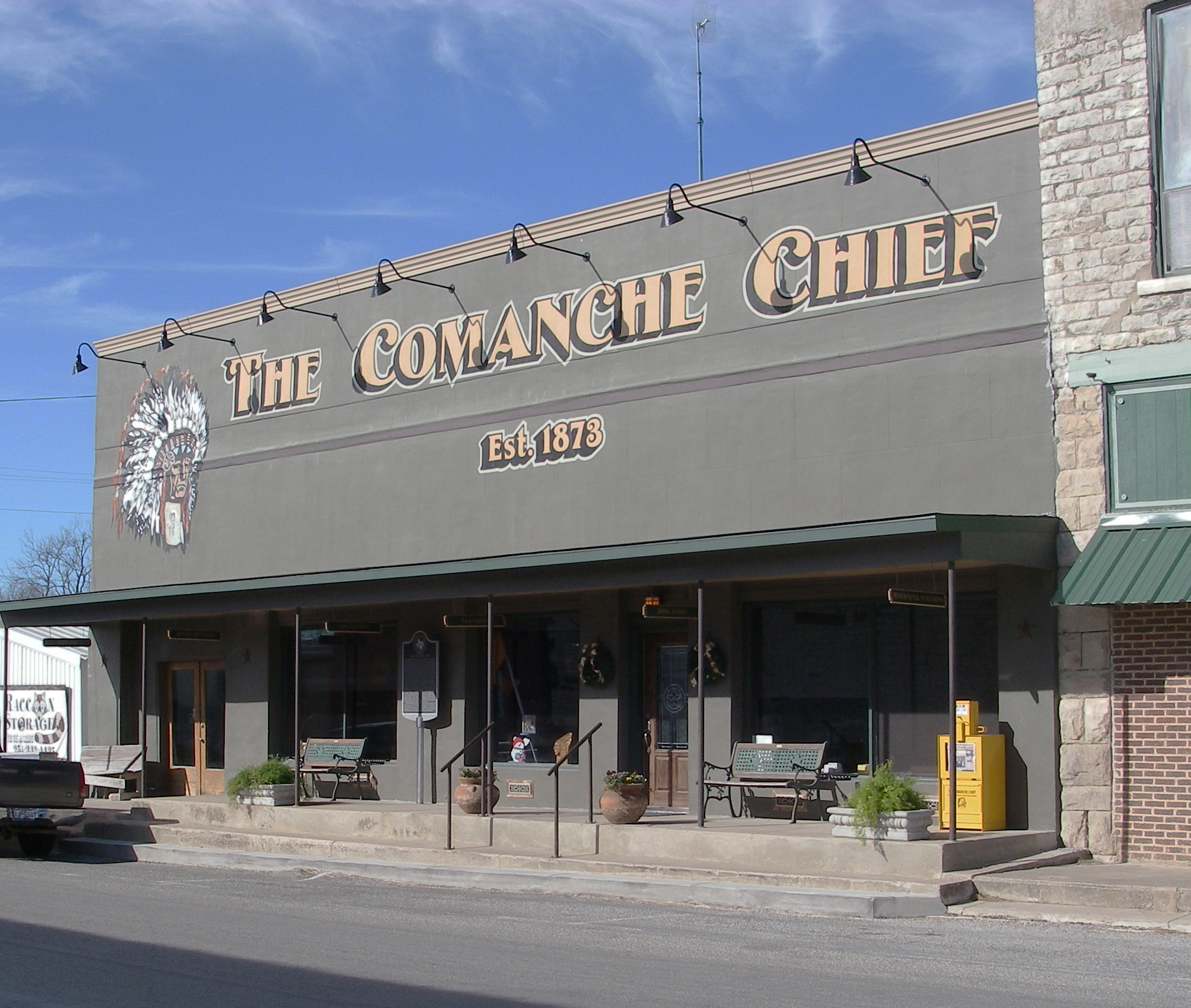
The Comanche Chief newspaper office in Comanche, Texas in 2008

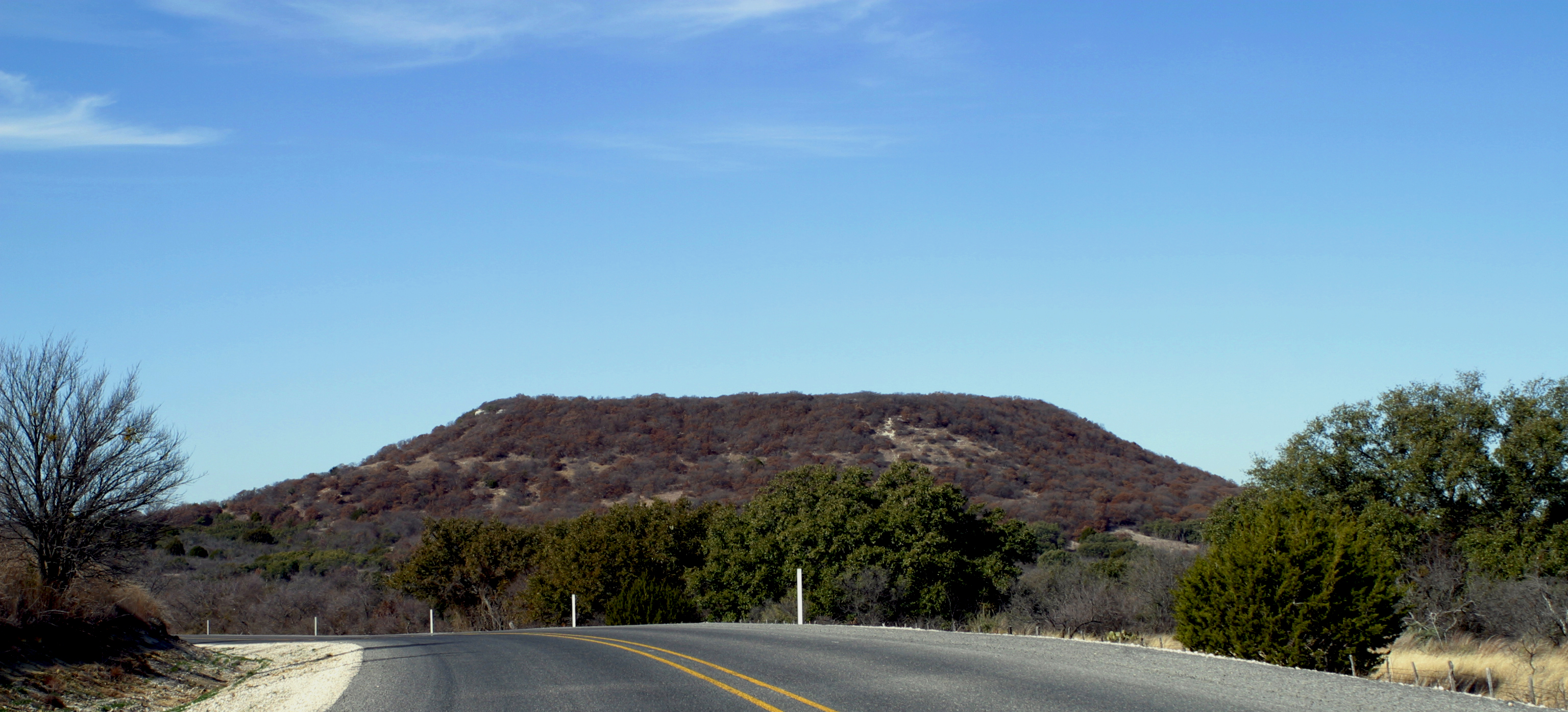
Round Mountain, a butte located 6 mi (9.7 km) to the northwest of Comanche, Texas, where Robert T. Hill first observed Lower Cretaceous fossils and strata. (31.925°N 98.702°W) (30 December 2008)

== Scientific career ==
In the 1880s, trained geologists were in demand from governments and businesses. The United States Geological Survey (USGS) was established in 1879, and John Wesley Powell had become director in 1881. Powell hired Hill in 1885 to work at the National Museum of the Smithsonian Institution in Washington, D.C. After a year of being assigned menial tasks such as the preparation of the survey's fossil collections, Hill was assigned to a three-month field season in his beloved Texas, which provided an opportunity to revisit the Cretaceous deposits of west-central Texas. He traversed portions of the state underlain by Cretaceous deposits accompanied by William Fletcher Cummins of Dallas, another geologist who would prove to be an influential figure in early Texas geological study.

In 1887, Hill published a 95-page report titled The Present Condition of Knowledge of the Geology of Texas. Although this report was primarily prepared as an undergraduate thesis at Cornell, it was also published as a bulletin of the USGS. Also in 1887, Hill managed to publish a number of important papers in the American Journal of Science on his findings with regard to the Cretaceous of Texas. Publication of The topography and geology of the Cross Timbers and surrounding regions in Northern Texas, established Hill as the first to recognize the two-fold subdivision of the Cretaceous system. The names that he introduced – the Comanche series applied to the Lower Cretaceous (named after his adopted home town of Comanche, Texas) and the Gulf series applied to the Upper Cretaceous – remain the standard for stratigraphic nomenclature in the western Gulf Coast region. Throughout the rest of Hill's professional career, he continued to publish numerous articles focused on various aspects of the Cretaceous period.

In 1888, Hill was invited to fill a newly formed chair of geology at the University of Texas at Austin. He was given the opportunity to teach the first courses in geology ever offered in Texas and to build a geology department in a new but already prestigious university. It did not last, though, as Hill returned to Washington, DC, and the USGS, and began an appointment with the Artesian and Underflow Investigation in 1890.

Hill's many contributions include the discovery of the western belt of fracture now known as the Texas Lineament, the delineation and naming of the Balcones Fault zone that forms the Balcones Escarpment, and the mapping and naming of many of the physiographic provinces of Texas. His stratigraphic studies and investigations of underground and artesian waters led to improvements of vast areas of farm and ranch land and served as the foundation for future petroleum exploration.

In October 1899, Hill led a six-man expedition to explore and document the canyons of the Rio Grande. Traveling in three boats, the expedition took nearly an entire month to travel from Presidio to Langtry, Texas. Hill packed photography equipment into the boats, and took a series of photographs, both during and after his river voyage. Two years later, Hill published an article describing his voyage, and describing the Big Bend region in the colorful language of the period.

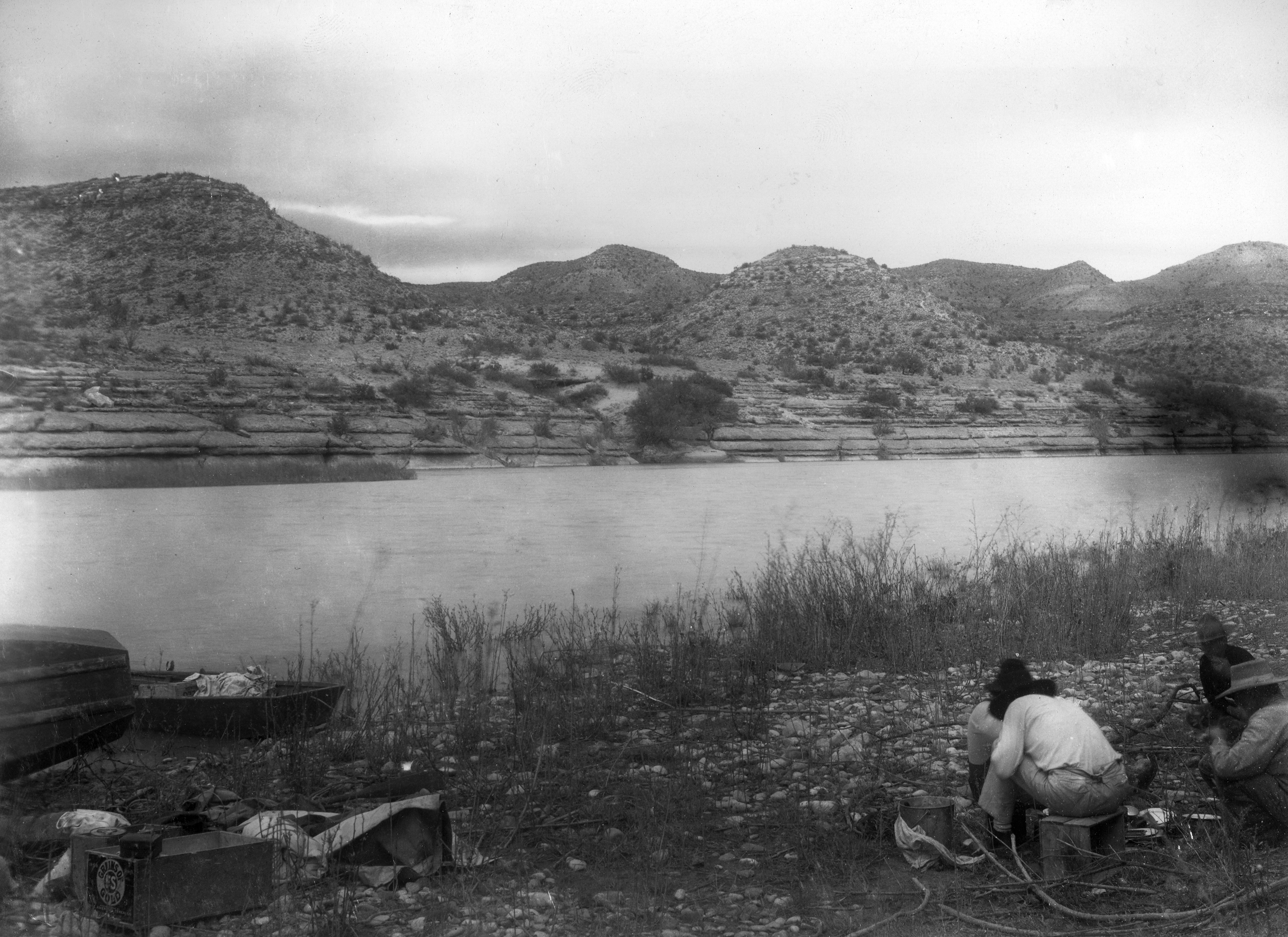
Hill's survey party enjoying a meal along the banks of the Rio Grande, Brewster County, Texas (1899)

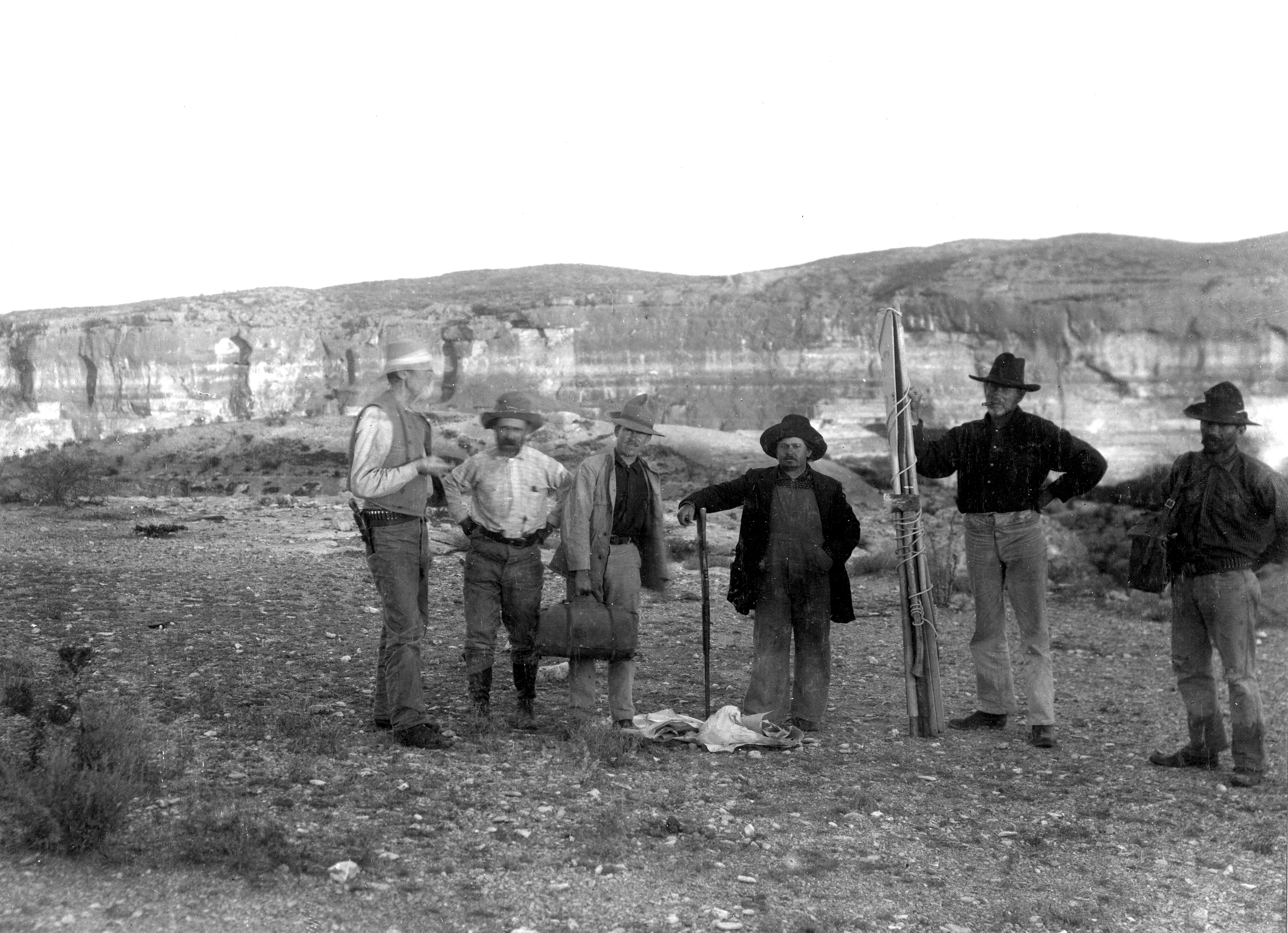
Hill's survey party leaving the canyons of the Rio Grande at Langtry. (28 Oct. 1899)

Near the turn of the century, Hill conducted studies in the West Indies and the Isthmus of Panama, areas he considered fundamental to understanding the geological evolution of North America. In 1902, following the eruption of Mont Pelée, Hill joined the relief expedition to Martinique that sailed on USS Dixie. He mapped the destruction area and wrote the first account of the devastating effects of dense, fast-moving clouds of hot gas and rock known as pyroclastic flows or nuée ardente, previously unknown to vulcanologists.

In 1921, Hill provided expert testimony in the boundary dispute case between Oklahoma and Texas. The decision rendered by the Supreme Court on January 15, 1923, found in favor of Texas and returned to Texas 450,000 acres (1,800 km^{2}) of Red River Valley land that was known to contain significant oil deposits.

== Legacy ==
Robert T. Hill Middle School, part of the Dallas Independent School District, is located in Dallas, Texas. It opened in 1957 as Robert T. Hill Junior High School.

== List of publications ==
1. Hill, R.T. 1887. The Texas section of the American Cretaceous. The American Journal of Science, 3rd Series, 34(202):287-309.
2. Hill, R.T. 1887. The topography and geology of the Cross Timbers and surrounding regions in Northern Texas. The American Journal of Science, 3rd Series, 33:291-303.
3. Hill, R.T. 1887. A partial report on the geology of western Texas. The American Journal of Science, 3rd Series, 33:73-75.
4. Hill, R.T. 1887. Corruption of American geographic names. Science 10(41):143.
5. Hill, R.T. 1887. The present condition of knowledge of the geology of Texas. United States Department of the Interior, U.S. Geological Survey, Bulletin 45, 95 pp.
6. Hill, R.T. 1888. Neozoic geology of southwestern Arkansas. Arkansas Geological Survey, Report for 1888, vol. 2, pp. 1–200, map, Little Rock,.
7. Hill, R.T. 1888. Notes on the geology of western Texas. Texas Geological and Scientific Bulletin, vol 1, No. 6.
8. Hill, R.T. 1888. Notes on provident institutions in Arkansas, Tennessee, and Texas. Journal of Social Science 25:152-157.
9. Hill, R.T. 1888. Ueber eine durch die Haüfigkeit hippuritenartiger Chamiden ausgezeichnete Fauna der oberturonen Kreide von Texas; von Ferdinand Roemer in Breslau. Aus den paläontologischen Abhandlungen von Dames und Kayser, viertes Band, Heft 4, Berlin, 1888, 15 pp. The American Journal of Science, 3rd Series, 37:318-319.
10. Hill, R.T. 1888. The Trinity formation of Arkansas, Indian Territory, and Texas. Science 11:21.
11. Hill, R.T. 1889. A portion of the geologic story of the Colorado River of Texas. The American Geologist 3(5):287-299.
12. Hill, R.T. 1889. The foraminiferal origin of certain Cretaceous limestones and the sequence of sediments in North American Cretaceous. The American Geologist 4:174-177.
13. Hill, R.T. 1889. Events in North American Cretaceous history illustrated in the Arkansas-Texas division of the southwestern region of the United States. The American Journal of Science, 3rd Series, 37(220):282-290.
14. Hill, R.T. and Penrose, R.A.F., Jr. 1889. Relation of the uppermost Cretaceous beds of eastern and southern United States and the Tertiary-Cretaceous history of Arkansas and Texas. The American Journal of Science, 3rd Series, 38(228):468-473.
15. Hill, R.T. 1889. The Permian rocks of Texas. Science 13:92.
16. Hill, R.T. 1889. A preliminary annotated check list of the Cretaceous fossils of Texas, accompanied by a short description of the lithology and stratigraphy of the system. Texas Geol. Surv., Bull. No. 4, 57 pp.
17. Hill, R.T. 1889. Roads and materials for their construction in the Black Prairie region of Texas. University of Texas Bulletin no. 53, 39 pp.
18. Hill, R.T. 1889. Paleontology of the Cretaceous formations of Texas, part 1, University of Texas, School of Geology, 5 pages, 3 plates, Austin.
19. Hill, R.T. 1890. Classification and origin of the chief geographic features of the Texas region. The American Geologist 5(1):9-29; (2):68-80.
20. Hill, R.T. 1890. Exploration of the Indian Territory and the medial third of Red River. The American Geologist 6:252-253.
21. Hill, R.T. 1890. The Texas Cretaceous. The American Geologist 6:253-254. (3/8 p.)
22. Hill, R.T. 1890. Pilot Knob. A marine Cretaceous volcano. The American Geologist 6:286-292.
23. Hill, R.T. 1890. Occurrence of Goniolina in the Comanche series of the Texas Cretaceous. The American Journal of Science, 3rd Series, 40(235):64-65.
24. Hill, R.T. 1890. A brief description of the Cretaceous rocks of Texas and their economic uses, based principally upon a preliminary section along the Colorado River from near Smithwick Mills, Burnet County, to Webberville, Travis County. In: Dumble, E.T. (ed.), First Annual Report of the Geological Survey of Texas, 1889. Austin: State Printing Office, pp. 103–144.
25. Hill, R.T. 1891. Notes on the geology of the southwest. The American Geologist 7(6):366-370.
26. Hill, R.T. 1891. Contributions to the geology of the Southwest. The American Geologist 7:119-122.
27. Hill, R.T. 1891. Notes on the geology of the Southwest. The American Geologist 7:254-255, 366-370.
28. Hill, R.T. 1891. Preliminary notes on the topography and geology of northern New Mexico and southwestern Texas and New Mexico. The American Geologist 8:133-141.
29. Hill, R.T. 1891. Notes on a reconnaissance of the Ouachita Mountain system in Indian Territory. The American Journal of Science, 3rd Series, 42(248):111-124.
30. Hill, R.T. 1891. The Comanche series of the Texas-Arkansas region. Bulletin of the Geological Society of America 2:503-528.
31. Hill, R.T. 1892. Geologic evolution of the non-mountainous topography of the Texas region. An introduction to the study of the Great Plains. The American Geologist 10(2):105-115.
32. Hill, R.T. 1892. The deep artesian boring at Galveston, Texas. The American Journal of Science, 3rd Series, 44:406-409.
33. Hill, R.T. 1892. Notes on the Texas-New Mexican region. Bulletin of the Geological Society of America 3:85-100.
34. Hill, R.T. 1892. On the occurrence of artesian and other underground waters in Texas, New Mexico, and Indian Territory, together with the geology and geography of those regions. Final Reports of the Artesian and Underflow Investigations of the U. S. Department of Agriculture, 166 pp.
35. Hill, R.T. 1892. Do we teach geology? The Popular Science Monthly 40:41-43.
36. Hill, R.T. 1893. The occurrence of Hematite and Martite iron ores in Mexico. The American Journal of Science, 3rd Series, 45(266):111-119.
37. Hill, R.T. 1893. The Cretaceous formations of Mexico and their relations to North American geographic development. The American Journal of Science, 3rd Series, 45(268):307-324.
38. Hill, R.T. 1893. Clay materials of the United States. In: Day, D.T. (ed.), Mineral Resources of the United States, calendar year 1891. United States Department of the Interior, U.S. Geological Survey, pp. 474–528.
39. Hill, R.T. 1893. Mexico as an iron-producing country. Engineering Magazine 4:744-753.
40. Hill, R.T. 1893. Artesian waters in the arid region. The Popular Science Monthly 42:599-611.
41. Hill, R.T. 1893. Paleontology of the Cretaceous formations of Texas – The invertebrate paleontology of the Trinity Division. Proceedings of the Biological Society of Washington 8:9-40.
42. Hill, R.T. 1893. The paleontology of the Cretaceous formations of Texas – The invertebrate fossils of the Caprina limestone beds. Proceedings of the Biological Society of Washington 8:97-108.
43. Hill, R.T. 1893. Tucumcari. Science 22(545):23-25.
44. Hill, R.T. 1894. Notes on the Tertiary and later history of the Island of Cuba. The American Journal of Science, 3rd Series, 48(285):196-212.
45. Hill, R.T. 1894. Geology of parts of Texas, Indian Territory and Arkansas adjacent to Red River. Bulletin of the Geological Society of America 5:297-338.
46. Hill, R.T. 1895. Discovery of a dicotyledonous flora in the Cheyenne sandstone. The American Journal of Science, 3rd Series, 49:473.
47. Hill, R.T. 1895. Notes on the geology of Cuba. Bulletin of the Museum of Comparative Zoölogy at Harvard College 16(15):243-288.
48. Hill, R.T. 1895. On outlying areas of the Comanche series in Kansas, Oklahoma and New Mexico. The American Journal of Science, 3rd Series, 50:205-234.
49. Hill, R.T. 1895. The radiolarian earths of Cuba. Science NS 2(45):628-629.
50. Hill, R.T. 1896. The Panama Canal route. The National Geographic Magazine 7(2):59-64.
51. Hill, R.T. 1896. Fundamental geographic relations of the three Americas. The National Geographic Magazine 7(5):175-181.
52. Hill, R.T. 1896. Descriptive topographic terms of Spanish America. The National Geographic Magazine 7(9):291-302.
53. Hill, R.T. 1896. A question of classification. Science NS 4(103):918-922.
54. Hill, R.T. 1897. Memoir of Robert Hay. Bulletin of the Geological Society of America 8:370-374.
55. Hill, R.T. 1897. The alleged Jurassic of Texas. The American Journal of Science, 4th Series, 4:449-469.
56. Hill, R.T. 1897. The easternmost volcanoes of the United States. Science NS 6(146):594-595.
57. Hill, R.T. 1898. The geological history of the Isthmus of Panama and portions of Costa Rica. Bulletin of the Museum of Comparative Zoölogy at Harvard College 28(5):149-285.
58. Hill, R.T. 1898. The stratigraphic succession in Jamaica. Report of the Sixty-Seventh Meeting of the British Association for the Advancement of Science, held at Toronto in August 1897, p. 642.
59. Hill, R.T. and Vaughn, T.W. 1898. Description of the Nueces Quadrangle. United States Department of the Interior, U.S. Geological Survey, Geological Atlas of the United States, Nueces Folio 42.
60. Hill, R.T. and Vaughn, T.W. 1898. Geology of the Edwards Plateau and Rio Grande Plain adjacent to Austin and San Antonio, Texas, with reference to the occurrences of underground waters. In: Eighteenth Annual Report of the Director of the U. S. Geological Survey for the year 1896-1897, Part II, pp. 193–321.
61. Hill, R.T. 1898. Cuba. The National Geographic Magazine 9(5):193-242.
62. Hill, R.T. 1898. Cuba and Porto Rico with Other Islands of the West Indies. New York: The Century, 430 pp.
63. Hill, R.T. 1898. Cuba, and its value as a colony. The Forum 25:403-415.
64. Hill, R.T. and Vaughn, T.W. 1898. The Lower Cretaceous Gryphæas of the Texas Region. United States Department of the Interior, U.S. Geological Survey, Bulletin 151, 66 pp.
65. Hill, R.T. 1899. The geology and physical geography of Jamaica: Study of a type of Antillean development. Bulletin of the Museum of Comparative Zoölogy at Harvard College, Vol. 34, 256 pp.
66. Hill, R.T. 1899. The commercial relations of the United States with the Far East. In: The Foreign Policy of the United States: Political and Commercial, Supplement to the Annals of the American Academy of Political and Social Science, pp. 131–143.
67. Hill, R.T. 1899. Mineral resources of Porto Rico. In: Twentieth Annual Report of the United States Geological Survey to the Secretary of the Interior, 1898–99, pp. 771–778.
68. Hill, R.T. 1899. Porto Rico. The National Geographic Magazine 10:93-112.
69. Hill, R.T. 1899. A sketch of the geology of Jamaica. The Scottish Geographical Magazine 15(12):628-639.
70. Hill, R.T. 1899. Notes on the Forest Conditions of Porto Rico. United States Department of Agriculture, Division of Forestry, Bulletin 25, 48 pp.
71. Hill, R.T. 1900. The great Chisos rift along the canyons of the Rio Grande. Proceedings of the American Association for the Advancement of Science, Forty-Ninth Meeting, held at New York, N.Y., June 1900, p. 189. (Also in Science NS 12(313), p. 991)
72. Hill, R.T. 1900. Topographic atlas of the United States: Physical geography of the Texas region. United States Department of the Interior, U.S. Geological Survey, Folio 3, 12 pp.
73. Hill, R.T. 1901. Running the cañons of the Rio Grande. The Century Illustrated Monthly Magazine 61:371-387.
74. Hill, R.T. 1901. The broken necklace. A lesson in the government of distant colonies. The Century Illustrated Monthly Magazine 62:53-59.
75. Hill, R.T. 1901. Geographic and geologic features of Mexico. The Engineering and Mining Journal 72:501-564.
76. Hill, R.T. 1901. The coast prairie of Texas. Science NS 14(348):326-328.
77. Hill, R.T. 1901. Geography and geology of the Black and Grand prairies, Texas with detailed descriptions of the Cretaceous formations and special reference to artesian waters. Twenty-First Annual Report of the United States Geological Survey to the Secretary of the Interior, 1899-1900, Part VII - Texas, 666 pp.
78. Hill, R.T. 1902. The volcano systems of the western hemisphere. Several groups of active volcanoes. The Century Illustrated Monthly Magazine 64:473-483.
79. Hill, R.T. 1902. A study of Pelée. Impressions and conclusions of a trip to Martinique. The Century Illustrated Monthly Magazine 64:764-785.
80. Hill, R.T. 1902. The upland placers of La Ciénega, Sonora, Mexico. The Engineering and Mining Journal 73:132-134.
81. Hill, R.T. 1902. The cinnabar deposits of the Big Bend province of Texas. The Engineering and Mining Journal 74:305-307.
82. Hill, R.T. 1902. On the volcanic disturbances in the West Indies. The National Geographic Magazine 13(7):223-267.
83. Hill, R.T. 1902. The geographic and geologic features, and their relation to the mineral products, of Mexico. Transactions of the American Institute of Mining Engineers (1901) 32:163-178.
84. Hill, R.T. and Vaughan, T.W. 1902. Austin folio, Texas. United States Department of the Interior, U.S. Geological Survey, Geological Atlas of the United States, Folio 76.
85. Hill, R.T. 1903. The Santa Eulalia District, Mexico. Engineering and Mining Journal 76:158-160.
86. Hill, R.T. 1903. The ore deposits of Cananea [Mexico]. The Engineering and Mining Journal 76:421.
87. Hill, R.T. 1903. Cananea revisited [Mexico]. The Engineering and Mining Journal 76:1000-1001.
88. Hill, R.T. 1903. The Beaumont Oil-Field, with notes on other oil-fields of the Texas region. Transactions of the American Institute of Mining Engineers (1902) 33:363-405.
89. Hill, R.T. 1904. The Guanajuato mining district [Mexico]. The Engineering and Mining Journal 77:599-601, 642-644.
90. Hill, R.T. 1904. The destruction of St. Pierre (A.D. 1902). In: Singleton, E. (ed.), The World's Great Events, New York: P.F. Collier, Vol. 5, pp. 2413–2425.
91. Hill, R.T. 1905. Pelée and the evolution of the windward Archipelago. Bulletin of the Geological Society of America 16:243-288.
92. Hill, R.T. 1905. Enrichment in fissure veins. The Engineering and Mining Journal 80:645-646.
93. Hill, R.T. 1905. The physical geography of Mexico – an introduction to the social, political, and economic geography of the republic. In: Report of the Eighth International Geographic Congress, held in the United States, 1904, pp. 765–766.
94. Hill, R.T. 1905. Physical history of the windward islands as illustrated in the larger story of Pelée – a study of volcanic and oceanic geography. In: Report of the Eighth International Geographic Congress, held in the United States, 1904. pp. 244–245.
95. Hill, R.T. 1906. Geologic and geographic aspects of Mexico. The Mining World 25:370-372, 459, 540-541, 596.
96. Hill, R.T. 1906. On the origin of the small mounds of the lower Mississippi Valley and Texas. Science NS 23(589):704-706.
97. Hill, R.T. 1907. Peculiar formations of the Mexican arid region. Engineering and Mining Journal 83(14):662-666.
98. Hill, R.T. 1907. Characteristics of some Mexican mining regions. Engineering and Mining Journal 84:631-636.
99. Hill, R.T. 1907. Geologic and geographic aspects of Mexico. The Mining World 26:69, 187; 27:589-591, 633-634, 805.
100. Hill, R.T. 1907. Mexico: Its geology and natural resources. The Mining World 27:686-691.
101. Hill, R.T. 1907. Geology of the Sierra Almoloya, with notes on the tectonic history of the Mexican Plateau. Science NS 25(644):710-712.
102. Hill, R.T. 1908. Growth and decay of the Mexican plateau. Engineering and Mining Journal 85(14):681-688.
103. Hill, R.T. 1908. The goldfield type of ore occurrence. Engineering and Mining Journal 86:1096-1099.
104. Hill, R.T. 1908. A scientific search for a new goldfield. Engineering and Mining Journal 86:1157-1160.
105. Hill, R.T. 1908. Camp Alunite, a new Nevada gold district. Engineering and Mining Journal 86:1203-1206.
106. Hill, R.T. 1920. Cuba. In: Mill, H.R. (ed.), The International Geography, New York: D. Appleton, pp. 793–798.
107. Hill, R.T. 1920. Porto Rico. In: Mill, H.R. (ed.), The International Geography, New York: D. Appleton, pp. 798–801.
108. Hill, R.T. 1921. Two limestone formations of the Cretaceous of Texas which transgress time diagonally. Science NS 53(1365):190-191.
109. Sellards, E.H., Tharp, B.C. and Hill, R.T. 1923. Investigations of the Red River made in connection with the Oklahoma-Texas boundary suit. In: University of Texas, Bulletin 2327, pp. 37–59.
110. Hill, R.T. 1928. Southern California geology and Los Angeles earthquakes. Los Angeles: Southern California Academy of Sciences, 232 pp.
111. Hill, R.T. 1929. Classification of the Pleistocene of California. Science NS 69(1788):379-380.
