= Buda Limestone =

Cretaceous formations in Texas and New Mexico

- Stratigraphic range: Late Cretaceous; Cenomanian
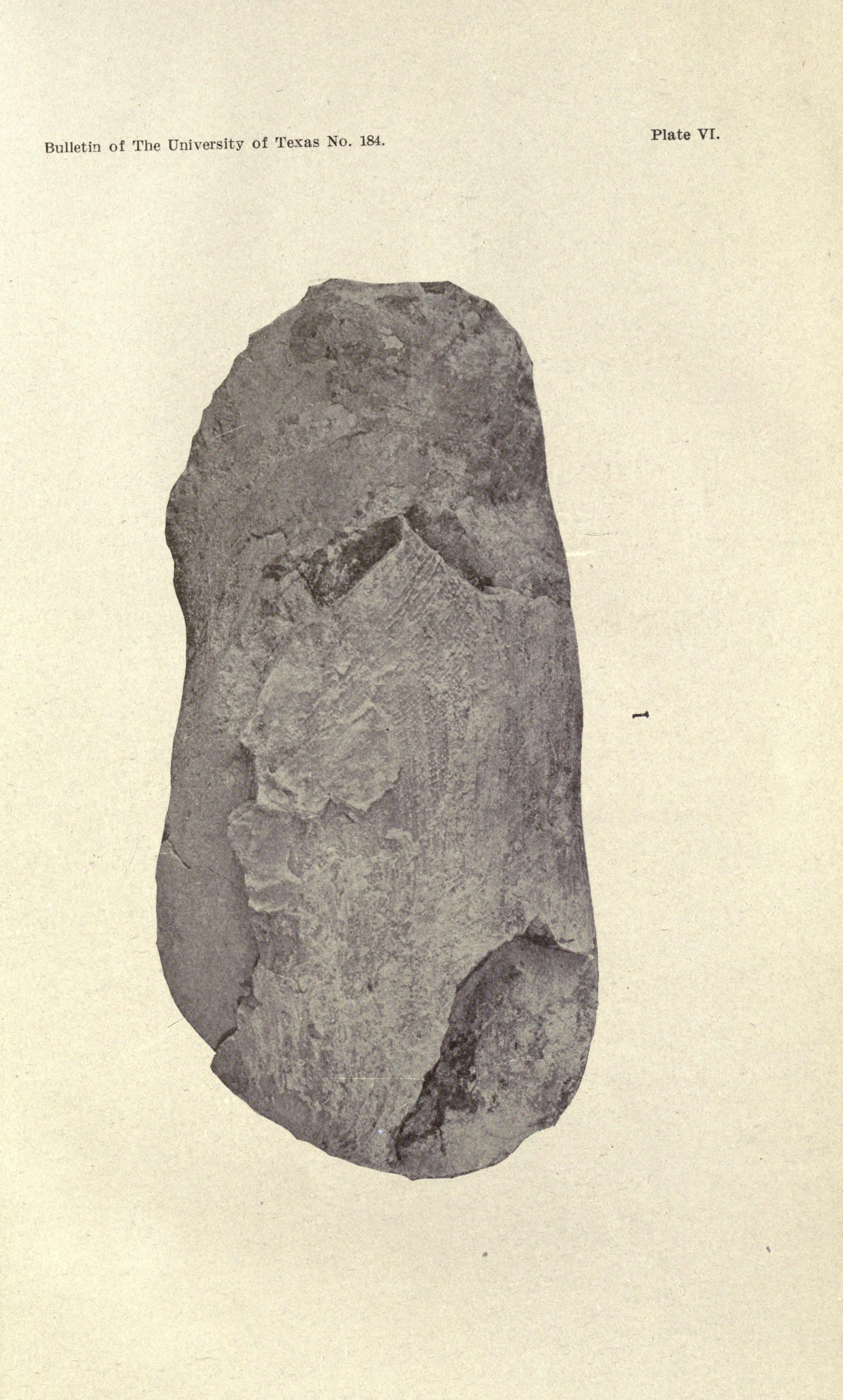
- Plate from "Fauna of the Buda Limestone"
- Type: Geological formation
- Unit of: Washita Group
- Underlies: Eagle Ford Group, Woodbine Formation, Boquillas Formation
- Overlies: Del Rio Formation and Grayson Formation
- Thickness: 100 feet (30 m)

Lithology
- Primary: Limestone

Location
- Coordinates: 30.0849°N 97.8507°W
- Region: North America
- Country: United States

Type section
- Named for: Buda, Texas
- Named by: T.W. Vaughan
- Year defined: 1900
- Buda Limestone (the United States) Buda Limestone (Texas)

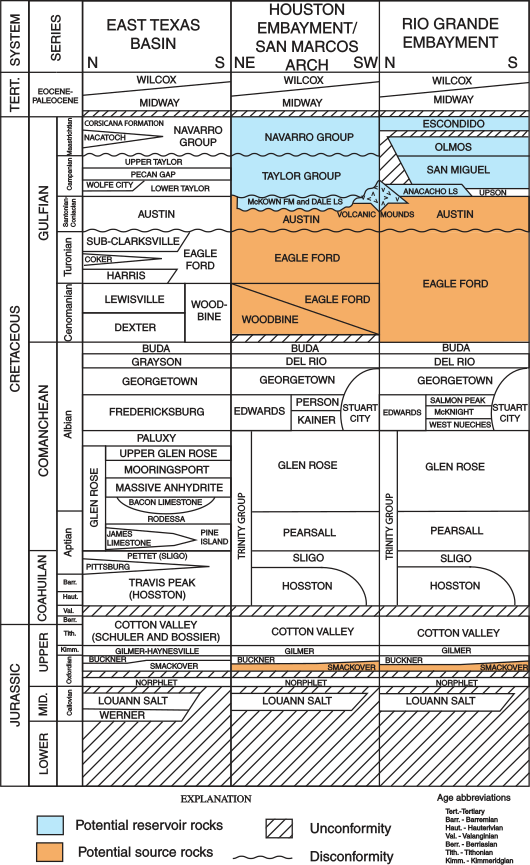
Buda Limestone stratigraphic column in Texas

The Buda Limestone is a geological formation in the High Plains and Trans-Pecos regions of West Texas and in southern New Mexico, whose strata date back to the Late Cretaceous. Pterosaur remains are among the fossils that have been recovered from the formation.

== Description ==
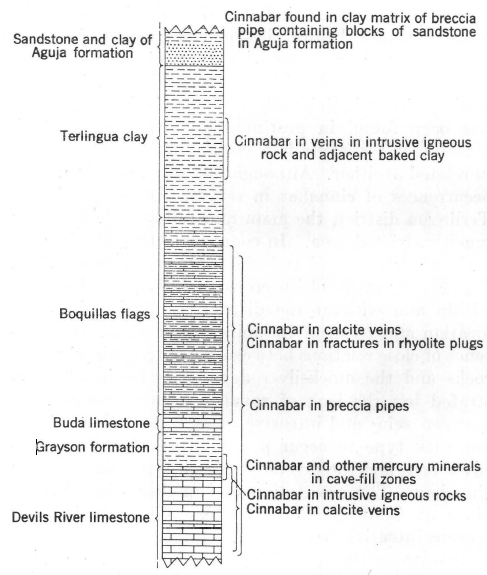
Terlingua stratigraphic column – Buda Limestone

The Buda Limestone is a dense white to yellow sparry limestone with numerous calcite veins that weathers to yellowish or pinkish due to its iron content. In far western Texas, the formation overlies the Del Rio Formation and is in turn overlain by the Eagle Ford Group. The total thickness is about 100 feet (30 m). In trans-Pecos Texas, the formation rests on the Grayson Formation and is overlain by the Boquillas Formation.

In the Big Bend National Park area, the formation is divided into three informal members. The lowest is 25 feet (7.6 m) of hard microgranular grayish-white limestone that breaks with a conchoidal fracture. The middle member is about 30 feet (9.1 m) of an argillaceous or marly nodular grayish-white limestone. The upper member is up to 60 feet (18 m) of limestone similar to the lower member.

== Fossils ==
Foraminifera are poorly preserved, but may include Globigerina. Gastropods, a few Gryphaea oysters, and the bivalve Alectryonia carinata has also been found in the formation. Abundant bivalve fossils are found in the formation east of Big Bend National Park.

Exposures in Hays County, Texas have yielded fossil remains of Pterodactyloidea, Ornithocheiroidea and Ornithocheiridae.

Type locality for Graptocarcinus texanus Roemer, 1887(Decapoda: Brachyura).

== Economic resources ==
The Buda Limestone is an important petroleum reservoir that has been exploited for decades via conventional vertical drilling. It is now being exploited using techniques such as horizontal and underbalanced drilling. While the vertical wells relied on the porosity of the formation (up to 6%), the horizontal wells exploit a system of natural vertical fractures in the formation.

== History of investigation ==
The formation was originally named the Shoal Creek Limestone, but this name was preempted, and the formation was renamed the Buda Limestone by T.W. Vaughan in 1900. By 1935, the formation had been included in the Washita Group.

== See also ==
- List of pterosaur-bearing stratigraphic units
