= Stratigraphic column =

Diagram used in geology to show the vertical sequence of rock units

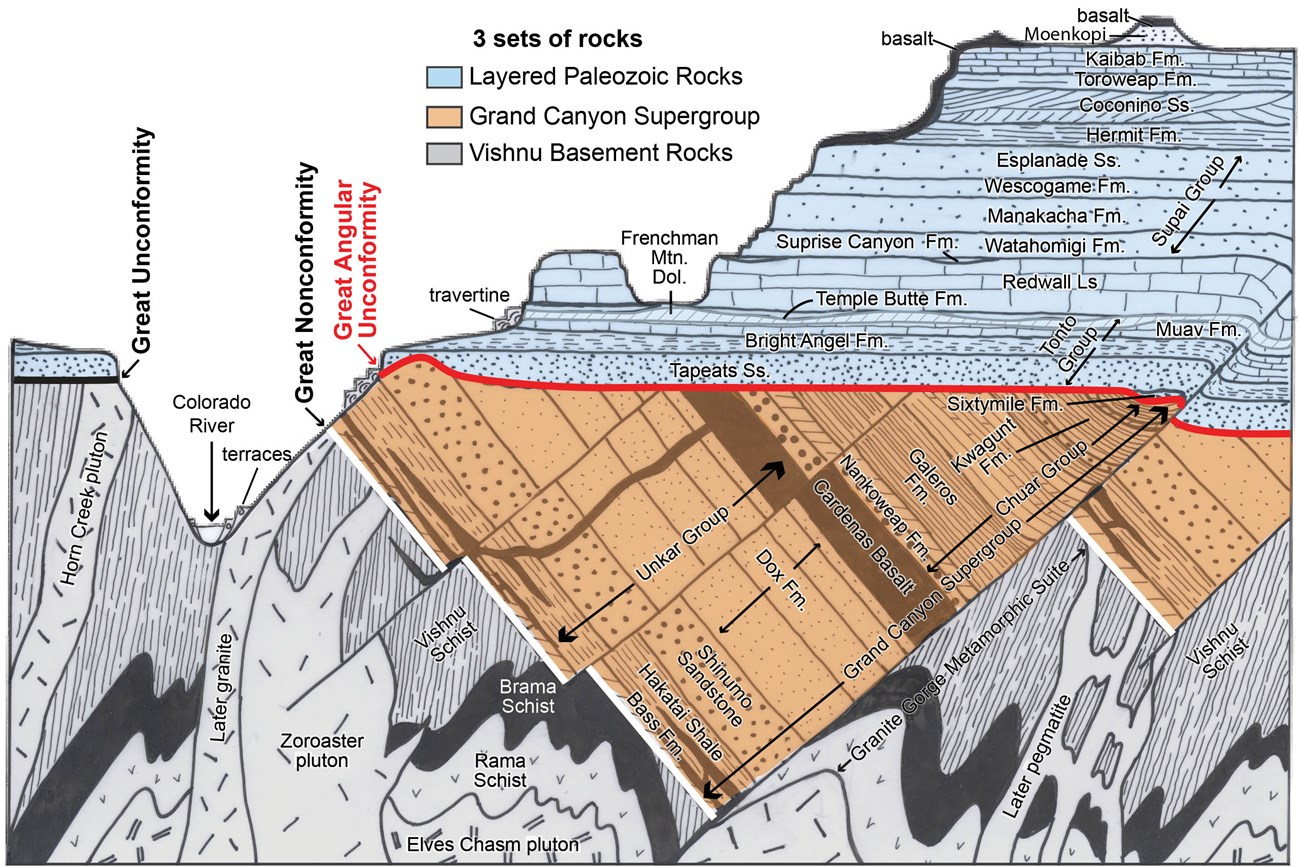
Stratigraphic column of the Grand Canyon, Arizona, United States.

A stratigraphic column is a representation used in geology and its subfield of stratigraphy to describe the vertical location of rock units in a particular area. A typical stratigraphic column shows a sequence of sedimentary rocks, with the oldest rocks on the bottom and the youngest on top.

In areas that are more geologically complex, such as those that contain intrusive rocks, faults, and/or metamorphism, stratigraphic columns can still indicate the relative locations of these units with respect to one another. However, in these cases, the stratigraphic column must either be a structural column, in which the units are stacked with respect to how they are observed in the field to have been moved by the faults, or a time column, in which the units are stacked in the order in which they were formed.

Stratigraphy is a branch of geology that concerns the order and relative position of geologic strata and their relationship to the geologic time scale. The relative time sequencing requires analysing the order and position of layers of archaeological remains and the structure of a particular set of strata.

The columns can include igneous and metamorphic rocks. However, sedimentary rocks are important geologically because of Classical Laws of Geology and how they relate to the accumulation of sediments and the formation of sedimentary environments.

Lithology is a study of bedrock that occurs at a specific location. The strata may contain fossils which aid in determining how old they are and geologist's understanding of sequence and timing. Geologists group together similar lithologies, and call these larger sedimentary sequence formations. There are rules on how formations are named, related to where they are located and what rock type(s) are present. All sedimentary formations shall receive distinctive designations. The most desirable names are binomial, the first part being geographic and the other lithologic. If the rock type is the same, then the formation may be called the "Lyons Sandstone", or the "Benton Shale". When there are several different lithologies within the formation, a more general terminology is used, such as the "Morrison Formation", which contains siltstone, sandstone, and limestone. "For regional studies, geologists will study the stratigraphy of as many separate areas as they can, prepare a stratigraphic column for each, and combine them in an attempt to understand the regional geologic history of the area".

== Laws and principles of geology ==
Principle of Uniformitarianism: defined in the authoritative Glossary of Geology as "the fundamental principle or doctrine that geologic processes and natural laws now operating to modify the Earth's crust have acted in the same regular manner and with essentially the same intensity throughout geologic time, and that past geologic events can be explained by phenomena and forces observable today; the classical concept that 'the present is the key to the past'.".

Law of Original Horizontality: sedimentary rocks are always deposited as horizontal, or nearly horizontal, strata, although these may be disturbed by later earth movements. This law was proposed by Nicolaus Steno in the mid-17th century.

Law of Superposition: general law upon which all geologic chronology is based: In any sequence of layered rocks, sedimentary or extrusive volcanic, that has not been overturned, the youngest stratum is at the top and the oldest at the base; i.e., each bed is younger than the bed beneath, but older than the bed above it. The law was stated by Steno in 1669.

Cross-cutting relationships: cross-cutting relationships is a principle of geology that states that the geologic feature which cuts another is the younger of the two features. It is a relative dating technique used commonly by geologists.

There are two main processes that are relevant to sedimentary strata formation: tectonic forces which build mountains and the surface, and erosional processes that transport the sediments to lower energy environments where they are then deposited. These processes results in large piles of accumulated sediments whenever there is a change in the depositional environment. The sedimentary particles are deposited dependent on the net energy in the transportation vector, typically water when dealing with sediments clasts.

"Brief descriptions of the units may be lettered to the right of the column, as in the figure, or the column may be accompanied by an explanation consisting of a small box for each lithologic symbol and for the other symbols alongside the column. Columns are constructed from the stratigraphic base upward and should be plotted first in pencil in order to insure spaces for gaps at faults and unconformities. Sections that are thicker than the height of the plate can be broken into two or more segments, with the stratigraphic base at the lower left and the top at the upper right. Bedding and unit boundaries are drawn horizontally, except in detailed sections or generalized sections of distinctly nontabular deposits, as some gravels and volcanic units".

The following elements of a stratigraphic column are essential and are generally keyed to the figure:

1. title, indicating topic, general location, and whether the section is single (measured in one coherent course), composite (pieced from two or more section segments), averaged, or generalized;
2. name(s) of geologist(s) and date of the survey;
3. method of measurement;
4. graphic scale;
5. map or description of locality;
6. major chronostratigraphic units, if known;
7. lesser chronostratigraphic units, if known;
8. names and boundaries of rock units;
9. graphic column composed of standard lithologic patterns;
10. unconformities;
11. faults, with thickness of tectonic gaps, if known;
12. covered intervals, as measured,
13. positions of key beds; and
14. positions of important samples, with number and perhaps data. Other kinds of information may be included also.

This recorded information from above will give geologist a description of what rocks are in a cliff or underground. This description allows a better understanding to the entire geology of that area. Can be used to decide whether there is potential for oil or natural gas that exists in these rocks. "The differences between rock unit types and fossils observed within the rock determine how these rocks are grouped for diagramming purposes. The column displays what types of rocks these units are composed of in two ways. The unit name itself reveals to geologists the rock type. and displays the relative thickness of the rock units".
