= Valley Spring, Texas =

Unincorporated community in Texas, US

- Unincorporated community
- Location in Texas Location in the United States
- Coordinates: 30°51′34″N 98°49′02″W
- Country: United States
- State: Texas
- County: Llano
- Elevation: 1,312 ft (400 m)
- Time zone: UTC-6 (Central (CST))
  - Summer (DST): UTC-5 (CDT)
- ZIP codes: 76885
- GNIS feature ID: 1380705

Valley Spring is an unincorporated community in Llano County, Texas, United States. According to the Handbook of Texas, the community had an estimated population of 50 in 2000. Valley Spring is situated along State Highway 71 in northwestern Llano County, approximately 12 miles northwest of Llano.

== History ==
The area was originally settled by the O.C.J. Phillips family in 1854 and was known as Phillips Ranch in the early years. Phillips son, W.O., established a cotton gin and sawmill on the ranch in 1860. Locals started referring to the community as Whistleville after the mill's summoning work whistle. Less than a mile from Whistleville, Davie Owen opened a competing mill and gin. The community surrounding Owen's mill was known as Bugscuffle. When a post office was established in 1878, it was located at the Bugscuffle establishment, which was renamed Valley Spring after the area's terrain and numerous springs. Four years later, the stage route from Llano to Brady was changed in 1882 and Mr. Owen built a store on the new route at the present-day site of Valley Spring.

The population had reached 100 by the 1930s, but had declined to 50 by the late 1960s. It remained at level through 2000. Valley Spring has a post office with the ZIP code 76885.

== Education ==
Public education in the community of Valley Spring is provided by the Llano Independent School District. Zoned campuses include Llano Elementary School (grades PK-5), Llano Junior High School (grades 6-8), and Llano High School (grades 9-12).

== Notable people ==
- James Fields Smathers (1888-1967), inventor of the electric typewriter
