= Llano Uplift =

Geologic dome in Texas, United States

- Location within Texas

Geography
- Country: United States
- State: Texas
- Region: Texas Hill Country
- County: Llano County
- Municipality: Llano, Texas
- Range coordinates: 30°10′27″N 99°03′55″W

Geology
- Orogeny: Grenville orogeny
- Rock age: Mesoproterozoic
- Rock type(s): Precambrian and Paleozoic inlier surrounded by Cretaceous uplands.

The Llano Uplift is a geologically ancient, low geologic dome that is about 90 miles (140 km) in diameter and located mostly in Llano, Mason, San Saba, Gillespie, and Blanco counties, Texas. It consists of an island-like exposure of Precambrian igneous and metamorphic rocks surrounded by outcrops of Paleozoic and Cretaceous sedimentary strata. At their widest, the exposed Precambrian rocks extend about 65 miles (105 km) westward from the valley of the Colorado River and beneath a broad, gentle topographic basin drained by the Llano River. The subdued topographic basin is underlain by Precambrian rocks and bordered by a discontinuous rim of flat-topped hills. These hills are the dissected edge of the Edwards Plateau, which consist of overlying Cretaceous sedimentary strata. Within this basin and along its margin are down-faulted blocks and erosional remnants of Paleozoic strata which form prominent hills.

The Llano Uplift is well known for its large, granite domes, such as Enchanted Rock. The area includes several major rock quarries like Granite Mountain that mine the distinctive pink granite. Further, the area contains the only known deposits of llanite.

In 1992, the Texas Department of Health identified the area as one of four regions with high potential for the presence of hazardous levels of radon gas.

== Geology ==
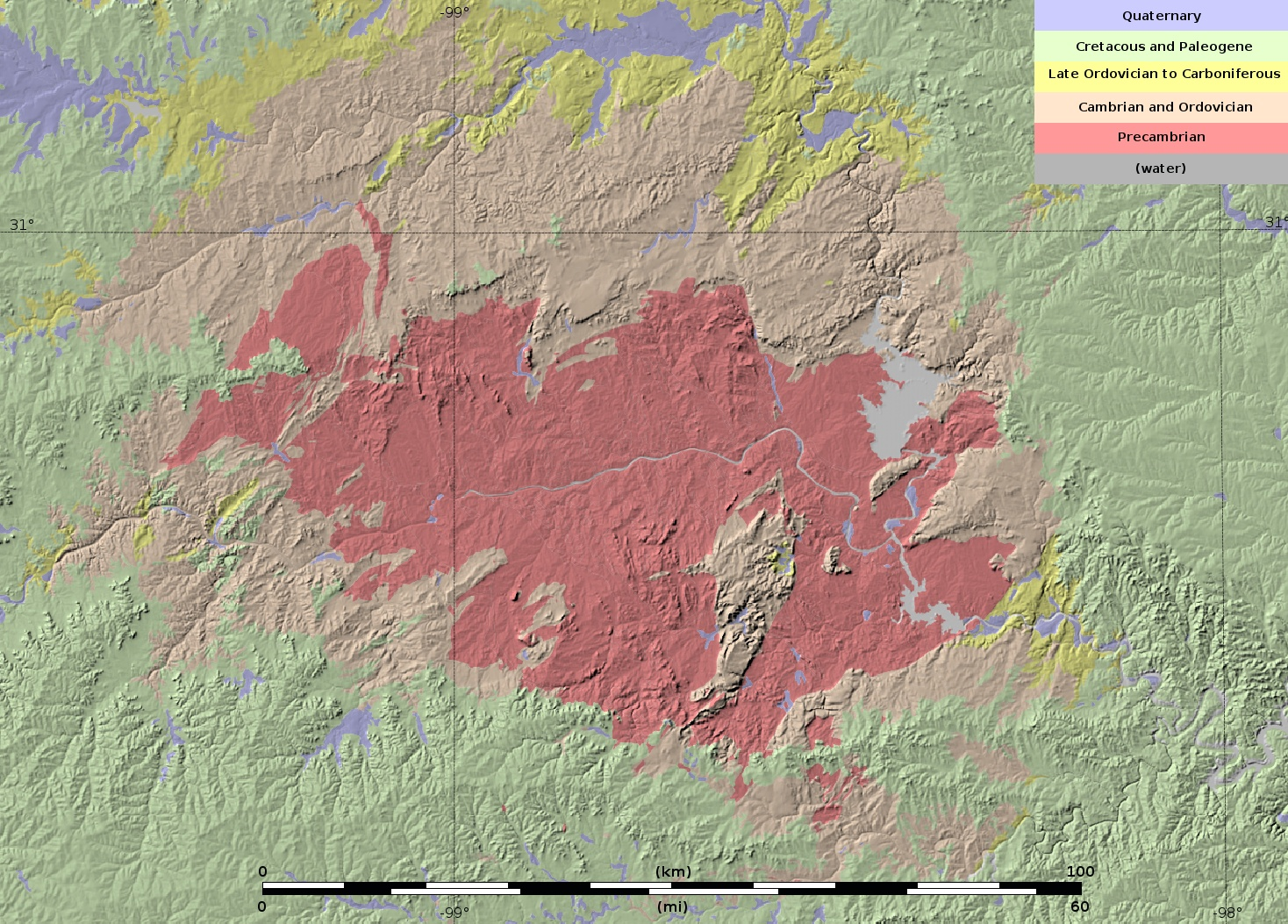
Llano Uplift - geologic map

The Llano Uplift can be considered an uplift by either its pattern on a geological or structural map of the top of the Precambrian rocks. It qualifies as an uplift because it consists of an extensive Precambrian basement high that is exposed by virtue of its surface lying significantly above in elevation the surface of surrounding Precambrian basement. However, the Llano Uplift may not have been ever uplifted as a distinct entity and at a single time as a basement high. Rather, it formed by the areas surrounding it having subsided around it and the Precambrian rocks underlying it having been elevated by the formation and interaction of multiple geologic structures at multiple times during the Carboniferous and Cretaceous periods.

=== Precambrian rocks ===
Precambrian rocks directly underlie the surface of the central and topographically lowest part of the Llano Uplift within a low-relief basin drained of the Llano River and eastward to the valley of the Colorado River. These rocks consist of about 9,000 km^{2} (3,500 sq mi) of Middle Proterozoic crystalline basement exposed in an erosional window eroded through overlying Phanerozoic sedimentary strata. The Precambrian basement is cut by numerous normal and oblique-slip faults, the result of the Ouachita Orogeny, that juxtapose Paleozoic strata with the Precambrian rocks.

The Precambrian rocks consist of multiply deformed, metasedimentary, metavolcanic and metaplutonic rocks that range in age from 1.37 to 1.23 Ga. These metamorphic rocks have been intruded by 1.13 to 1.07 Ga, syntectonic to post-tectonic granites. These rocks can be divided into three fault-bounded blocks of strata called domains. They are called the Valley Spring, Packsaddle, and Coal Creek domains. Each of these domains contain distinctive rock types and ages and were either erupted, intruded, or deposited in three separate areas and later tectonically juxtaposed during the Grenville Orogeny. The Valley spring domain consists mainly of gneiss that is composed of quartz and microcline feldspar with minor biotite and hornblende. Likely, this gneiss consists of highly metamorphosed sedimentary, volcanic, and intrusive rocks that include rhyolite lava flows and ash-flow tuffs; igneous intrusions; and arkose interbedded with minor limestone, and shale. The age of these metamorphic rocks range from range from 1.29 to 1.23 Ga. The Packsaddle domain consists mainly of schists composed of hornblende, biotite, muscovite, and actinolite; marbles and calc-silicate rocks; quartzites; and quart-feldspar gneiss. These rocks were likely originally marine limestone, shale, and sandstone interbedded with mafic and felsic volcanic rocks and intrusive sills. They date from 1.27 to 1.25 Ga. Granitic sills that intrude these rocks have been dated from 1.255 to 1.250 Ga. The Coal Creek domain consists of a 6.4-kilometer-long (4.0 mi) mass of serpentinite (The Coal Creek Serpentinite) that is surrounded by meta-igneous quartz-plagioclase gneiss of the Big Branch Gneiss. The gneiss has been dated at 1.33 to 1.30 Ga and was metamorphosed about 1.29 Ga, earlier than any other Llano metamorphic rocks. Coal Creek domain also contains diorite plutons, gabbro, amphibolite, mafic schist, minor talc, and smaller serpentinite bodies, all of which were metamorphosed about 1.26 Ga. The Coal Creek domain appears to represent fragments of an island arc with a slice of oceanic mantle faulted into it.

After 1.2 Ga, a global cycle of continental collision and the resulting mountain formation, globally called the Grenville orogeny, and locally called the Llano Orogeny, tectonically shoved and interleaved together these strata. They were also further altered by metamorphism into the rocks that outcrop today in the Llano Uplift. Large granitic plutons that locally form a large percentage of the outcrop in some areas and a llanite dike also intruded them. During the 400-million year interval between the emplacement of llanite and the start of Middle Cambrian sedimentation, erosion removed several kilometers of Precambrian rock.

=== Lower Paleozoic (Cambrian and Ordovician) ===
Within and around the Llano uplift are erosional remnants and down-faulted blocks of Lower Paleozoic sedimentary strata. Within the Llano Uplift, these remnants and fault blocks often form prominent hills. The Lower Paleozoic strata are composed of over 600 meters (2,000 ft) of Cambrian sandstones, limestones, and dolomites of the Moore Hollow Group and Lower Ordovician limestone and dolomite of the Ellenburger Group. The Moore Hollow Group which consists of the Hickory sandstone, Cap Mountain limestone, and Lion Mountain sandstone, and the Wilberns Formation, which consists of sandstone, limestone, shale, and an upper mixture of limestone and dolomite. The Ellenburger Group is an incomplete sequence of Lower Ordovician strata, which are divided, from the base up, into the Tanyard, Gorman, and Honeycut formations. These formations contain limestones and dolomites, which are typically nonglauconitic and sparingly fossiliferous. An erosional, pre-Devonian paleosurface with well-developed paleokarst truncates the Ellenberger Group such that it thins from a thickness of 570 meters (1,870 ft) in the southeastern corner of the Llano region to only 250 meters (820 ft) in the northwestern corner of the region.

The Moore Hollow Group records the advancing of a sea from the southeast across eroded Precambrian rocks during Middle to Late Cambrian times and subsequent burial beneath coastal and nearshore marine sediments. The Cambrian sea spread northward across the eroded surface an area of Precambrian rocks that had a local relief as great as 240 meters (790 ft). As a result, sediments composed of locally derived residuum, often wind-abraded accumulated as a thin, discontinuous cobble conglomerate overlying Precambrian strata at the base of the Moore Hollow Group. Following the deposition of the uppermost Cambrian limestones and dolomites, the Lower Ordovician Ellenburger Group (composed of the Tanyard, Gorman, and Honeycut Formations) accumulated within shallow-water carbonate platforms. At the end of the Lower Ordovician, the Central Texas region was tilted eastwards and exposed to subaerial erosion and karstification.

Possible reworked Middle Ordovician conodonts (Chirognathus) have been found in younger strata and a pocket of Upper Ordovician limestone, the Burnam Limestone, is preserved in a collapse structure in Burnet County. The reworked conodonts and the Burnam Limestone indicate that the region of the Llano Uplift was likely either partially and briefly submerged during the Middle and Upper Ordovician only to have the sediments deposited during these inundations removed by later erosion.

=== Middle Paleozoic (Silurian and Devonian) ===
Within the Llano Uplift, fossiliferous Silurian and Devonian strata occur preserved as the fills of solution and collapse structures that vary in size from large structural sinks to crack fillings a few inches or less in width. Isolated deposits of fossiliferous Starcke Limestone preserved in ancient sinkholes developed in the Ellenberger Group provide definite evidence of the Llano region having been inundated by marine waters at least once during the Silurian Period. Fossiliferous Devonian limestones of various types that are preserved in cave fills, collapse depressions, and other paleokarst features develop in the Ellenberger Group also demonstrate that the Llano region was also episodically inundated by marine waters during the Devonian period. During periods of subaerial exposure, these deposits were largely stripped from the region of the Llano Uplift. The pockets and remnants of Devonian strata preserved in paleokarst included the Bear Spring Formation, Pillar Bluff Limestone, Stribling Formation, and, in part, the Houy Formation. Breccias found at the base of the base of the pockets of Devonian strata likely represent a mixture of residuum developed by the subaerial, in situ dissolution of underlying limestones and dolomites and residuum eroded and redeposited by an advancing marine shoreline.

=== Late Paleozoic (Carboniferous and Permian) ===
Like the Devonian strata found in the Llano Uplift, early Carboniferous (Mississippian) strata, the youngest black shale of the Houy Formation, the crinoidal limestone of Chappel Limestone and the black shale Barnett Formation consist of at most a few meters of strata preserved within collapse structures and other paleokarst. As in case of the Devonian and Silurian strata found within the Llano uplift, these strata represent brief periods of inundation of the region by shallow epicontinental seas and marine sedimentation alternating with long periods of terrestrial exposure during which these marine sediments were almost completely removed by erosion.

Late Carboniferous ( Lower Pennsylvanian ) strata are in large part exposed in three non-contiguous areas. First, an isolated areal exposure of Smithwick Shale and underling Marble Falls Limestone occurs near Marble Falls, Texas, area in southwestern Burnet County. Second, in southwestern Mason County and northeastern Kimble County, late Carboniferous Marble Falls Limestone overlying relatively thin early Carboniferous strata is exposed within a half dozen, isolated fault blocks on the southwestern periphery of the Llano region. Finally, late Carboniferous are exposed as within a triangular shaped region that is bisected by the Colorado River along the northwest, north, and northeast periphery of the Llano region in McCulloch, San Saba, and Lampasas counties. In this area, Marble Falls Limestone, Smithwick Shale, and lower Strawn Group are well exposed. The strata of the lower Strawn Group are truncated by an erosional unconformity that is overlain by much younger Cretaceous strata.

The succession of Carboniferous strata within and adjacent to the Llano Uplift records the pronounced subsidence and filling of the adjacent Fort Worth Basin by the westward progradation of delta and associated fluvial systems from the uplifted Ouachita Mountains to the east. The Chappell Limestone and Barnett Shale represent episodic early Carboniferous inundations of the Llano region followed its submergence and formation of a carbonate platform within which the Marble Falls Limestone accumulated as a lateral equivalent to deeper water Smithwick Shale. As the Fort Worth Basin deepened and sank in responses to the Ouachita Orogeny, Smithwick Shale was deposited on former sites of Marble Falls sedimentation within the Llano Uplift region. In the deeper part of the Llano region, basin-fill shale and submarine fan deposits that form the lower Strawn Group accumulated. As the basin filled during the remainder of the Carboniferous and Permian, fluvial-deltaic sediments and associated shallow marine continental shelf deposits of the upper Strawn, Canyon, and Cisco group accumulated within the Fort Worth Basin.

=== Mesozoic ===
The only Mesozoic rocks that are known in the Llano region are those of the Cretaceous system. Throughout Triassic and Jurassic periods, the Llano region was eroded. The accumulation of Triassic, terrestrial red beds of the Dockham Group may have reached to the western edge Llano region. However, they were eroded back to its present position and underlying strata eroded during the Triassic and Jurassic in response regional tilting and uplift.

By the time that the regions of the Llano Uplift was slowly covered by Cretaceous sedimentary deposits, it had been reduced by erosion to a low relief erosion surface termed the Wichita paleoplain. What little research has been conducted on the Wichita paleoplain estimates that as much as 33 meters (108 ft) of relief exists on this surface cut into the underlying strata. During the Cretaceous, this surface was progressively buried by the accumulation of fluvial and coastal sediments of the Trinity Group and later by the Walnut, Comanche Peak, and Edwards formations.

=== Cenozoic ===
Erosion that has occurred since the withdrawal of Cretaceous seas has resulted in a topographic inversion. As a result, the oldest and structurally highest rocks tend to occur at the lowest topographic elevations. Where the Cretaceous rocks rim the Llano uplift, a sharp topographic rise or escarpment is common.

== Central Mineral region ==
The Llano Uplift region is also called the Central Mineral region of Texas because of the occurrence of the great variety of minerals found in and the numerous ore prospecting pits dug into exposed Precambrian rocks and Lower Paleozoic strata. Over the decades, a few small mines have yielded yttrium and other rare-earth minerals, magnetite, feldspar, vermiculite, serpentine, and gem quality topaz. Briefly, galena as lead ore was mined from limestone lying unconformably upon granite knobs that were once hills before being submerged by rising relative sea level in the Cambrian. Minor showings of gold, silver, copper, tin, bismuth, molybdenum, tungsten, and uranium minerals have been found and explored in prospecting pits. Before it closed in 1980, the Southwestern Graphite mine northwest of Burnet, Texas, was the only major producer of high-purity graphite in North America for several decades. In the past large quantities of soapstone were excavated from outcrops south of Llano, Texas, and ground for use as insecticide carrier and inert filler in various products. The principal mineral resources currently produced from Central Mineral region consist of fracturing sand (“Frac sand”), crushed stone, and building stone. Granite has been quarried from almost innumerable localities and the active production of dimension stone continues today from a dome of coarse pink Town Mountain Granite near Marble Falls, Texas.

Llano uplift context and features

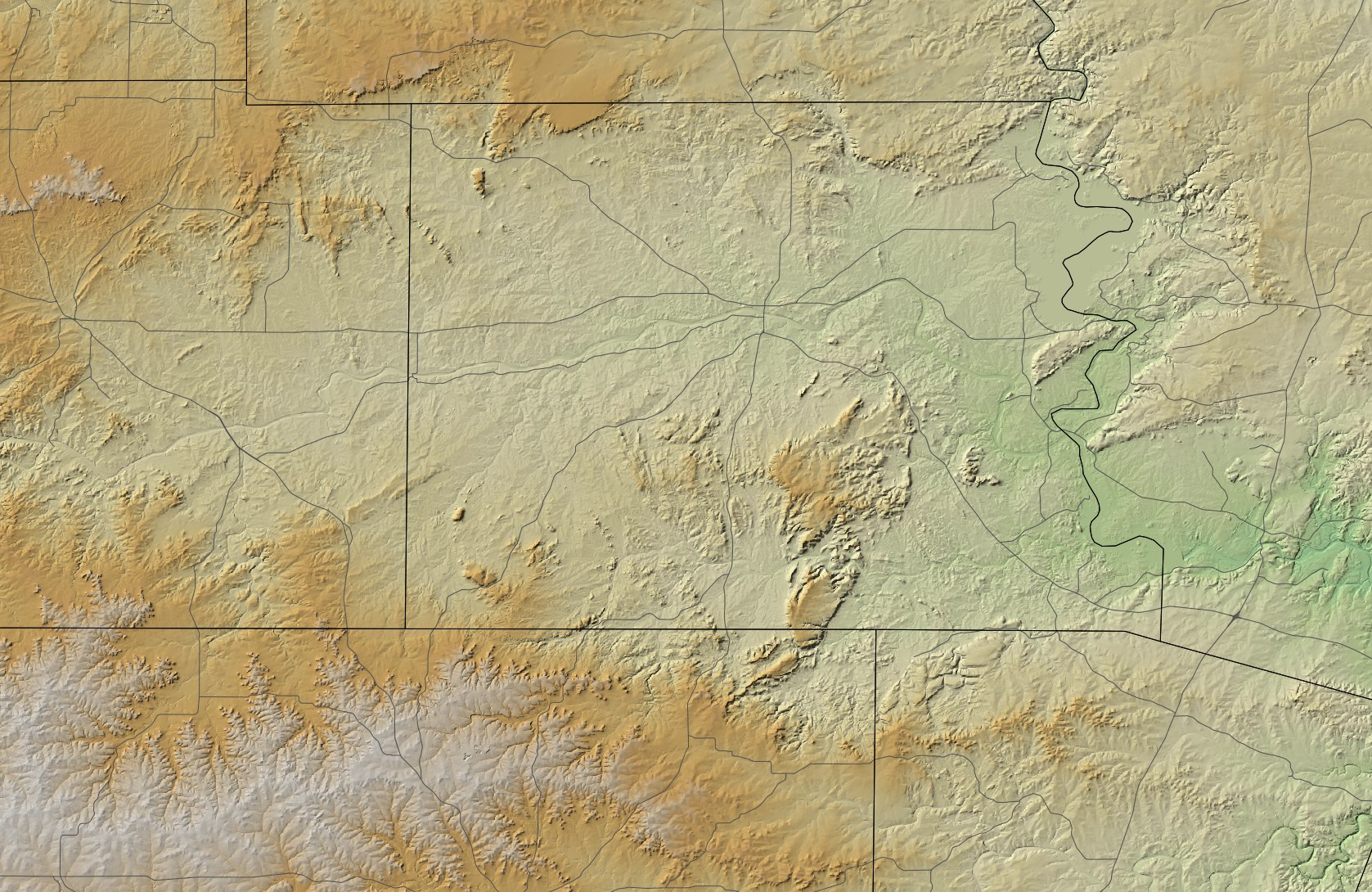
Llano area in relief context

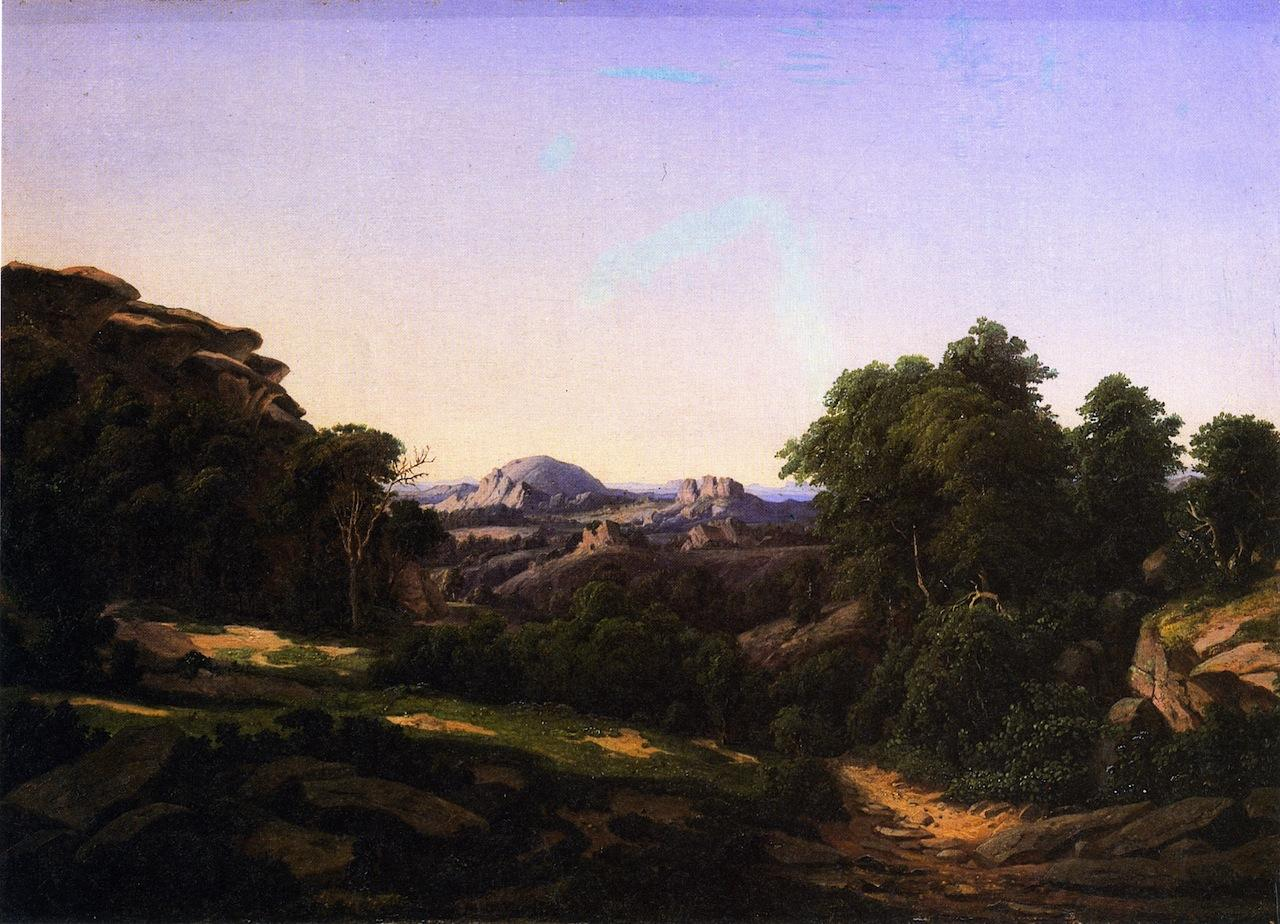
Enchanted Rock near Fredericksburg, painted by Hermann Lungkwitz in 1864, oil.

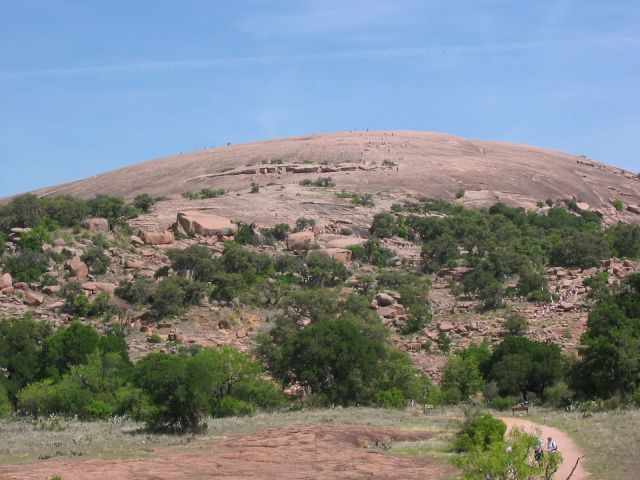
Enchanted Rock

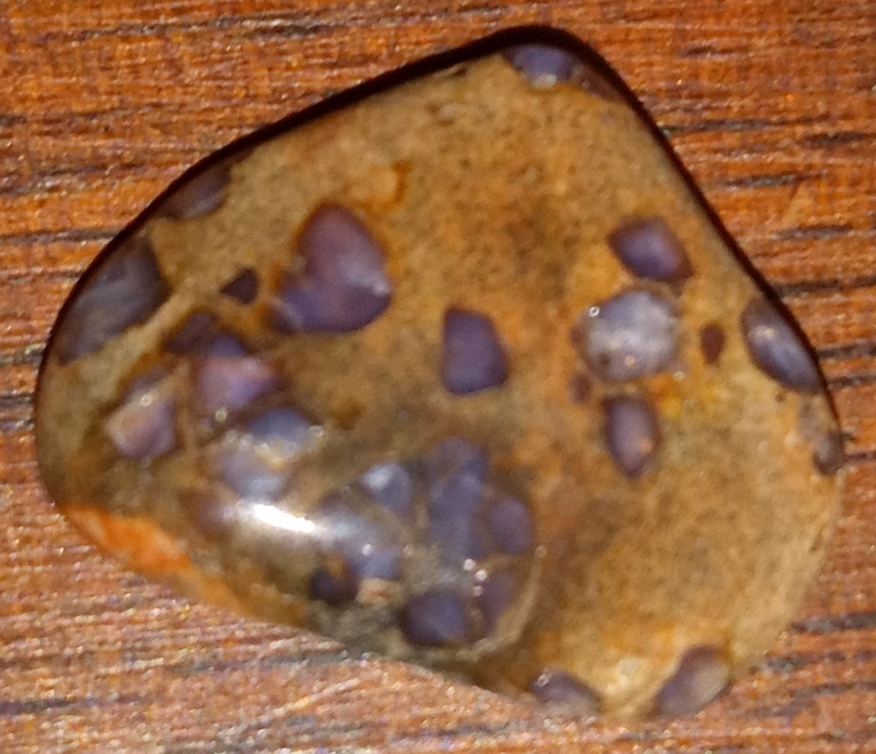
Llanite rock

== See also ==
- Geology of Texas
