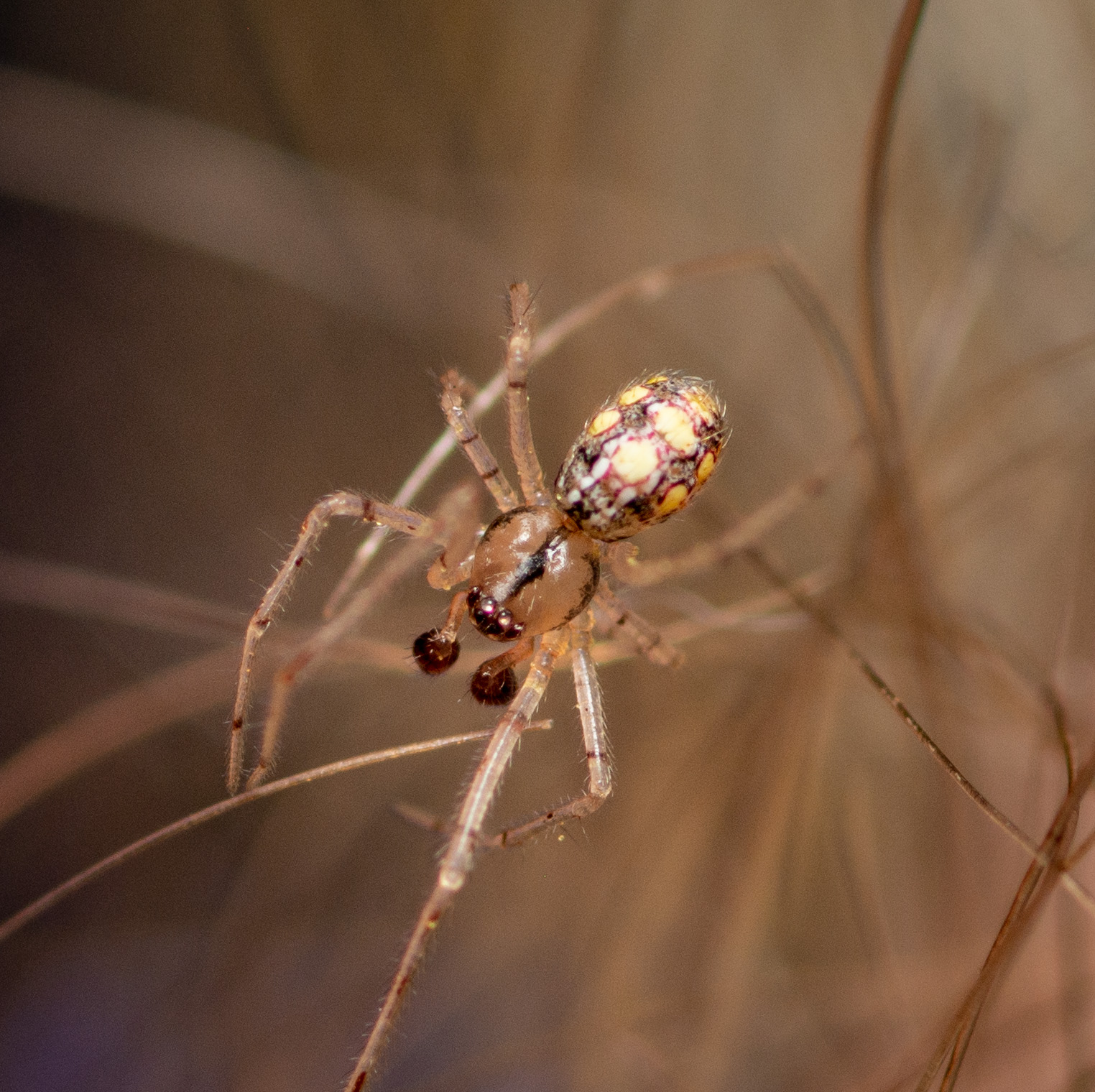
- Theridion llano male

Scientific classification
- Kingdom: Animalia
- Phylum: Arthropoda
- Subphylum: Chelicerata
- Class: Arachnida
- Order: Araneae
- Infraorder: Araneomorphae
- Family: Theridiidae
- Genus: Theridion
- Species: T. llano

Binomial name
- Theridion llano Levi, 1957

= Theridion llano =

Species of spider

Theridion llano is a species of cobweb spider in the family Theridiidae. It is found in the United States. The specific epithet is a reference to the type locality - Llano, Texas.
