= Coal Creek Serpentinite (Texas geology) =

Precambrian geologic formation in Llano Uplift, Texas

- Stratigraphic range: Mesoproterozoic
- Type: Geological formation
- Unit of: Coal Creek domain
- Area: southeastern Llano Uplift, Texas-(central)
- Thickness: maximum of 1.4 mi (2.3 km)

Lithology
- Primary: serpentinite
- Other: soapstone

Location
- Coordinates: 30°28′50″N 98°37′48″W
- Region: Llano Uplift, Texas
- Country: United States
- Extent: 2.54 sq mi (6.6 km^{2})

Type section
- Named for: Coal Creek, a local intermittent stream
- Named by: Virgil E. Barnes
- Year defined: 1940

The Coal Creek Serpentinite (Coal Creek Serpentine) is a name for a Precambrian rock formation that outcrops on the southeastern side of the Llano Uplift in Gillespie and Blanco counties, Texas. The Coal Creek Serpentinite is tabular south-dipping body of serpentinite. Its outcrop is about 3.7 mi (6.0 km) long along an east–west axis and varies in width from 0.3 to 1.4 mi (0.48 to 2.25 km). Along the central part of the body, the southern contact of the serpentinite slopes about 60° to the south and gradually decreases in dip to about 40° further west. The southern and northern contacts are shear zones. The serpentinite underlies a very sparsely vegetated east–west trending ridge.

V. E. Barnes named the Coal Creek Serpentinite in 1940 for Coal Creek. This creek is a broad intermittent stream that transports granite wash and crosses the western end of the serpentinite outcrop.

== Accessibility ==
The entire outcrop can be accessed by driving on Willow City Loop and County Road 310. The easiest way of getting to a decent outcrop is turning onto Willow City Loop off of State Road 16. The Coal Creek Serpentinite is accessible only by entering private property, so prior permission is required. The Willow City Loop, which is the main route can be accessed by the public, however signs are posted exclaiming no one can stop for anything.

== Geology ==
Coal Creek Serpentinite is a large tabular body of serpentinized harzburgite. It is in tectonic contact with the enclosing meta-igneous rocks and shows a complex history of serpentinization, metamorphism, and deformation. It is highly foliated and intruded by numerous thin metabasaltic dikes that show metasomatic alteration zones at their margins. The serpentinite varies widely in color, texture, and structure. In color, it exhibits various shades of green, ranging from light yellowish green through dark green to very dark-colored rocks with a greenish cast.

The Coal Creek Serpentinite is typically composed of lizardite cross-cut by secondary veins of chrysotile and layers of accessory magnetite, tremolite, talc, chlorite, and relict chromite. The massive specimens of this serpentinite exhibit a lizardite mesh texture that represent pseudomorphs after olivine, pyroxene, and minor metamorphic amphibole. The presence of olivine, orthopyroxene, and anthophyllite in two specimens suggest that the Coal Creek Serpentinite is metamorphosed harzburgite. This is interpreted to indicate that the serpentinite is the highly altered ultramafic tectonite portion of an ophiolite.

The contacts of the Coal Creek Serpentinite with the surrounding metamorphosed igneous rocks consists entirely of shear zones. Its southern edge is bordered by the Big Branch Gneiss except along Big Branch Creek where it lies adjacent to a small sliver of Packsaddle Schist. Along its northern margin, the Big Branch Gneiss and Packsaddle Schist are in contact with this body of serpentinite.

== Coal Creek Domain ==
Th Coal Creek Serpentinite is part of the Coal Creek Domain. The Coal Creek Domain consists of metamorphosed, and deformed (foliated, sheared, and faulted) diorite and tonalite igneous plutons, including the Big Branch Gneiss, that are exposed within southeastern Llano Uplift. Crystallization ages (U–Pb dating of zircons) of the original igneous protoliths lie in the ranges of 1326–1301 Ma and 1286–1275 Ma. The Coal Creek Serpentinite is interpreted to be a piece of oceanic crust that was tectonically incorporated within the Coal Creek Domain during the accretion of an island arc by plate tectonics to continental crust (Packsaddle Schist) of Laurentia. A thick mylonite zone, the Sandy Creek shear zone, is the boundary between the Coal Creek Domain (island arc) and Packsaddle Schist (Laurentia).

== See also ==
- Geology of Texas
- List of ophiolites
