= Granite Mountain (Texas) =

Mountain in Burnet County, Texas, United States

- Granite Mountain present day

Highest point
- Elevation: 965 ft (294 m)
- Coordinates: 30°35′18″N 98°18′04″W

Geography
- Location: Burnet County, Texas, United States

Geology
- Rock type: Granite

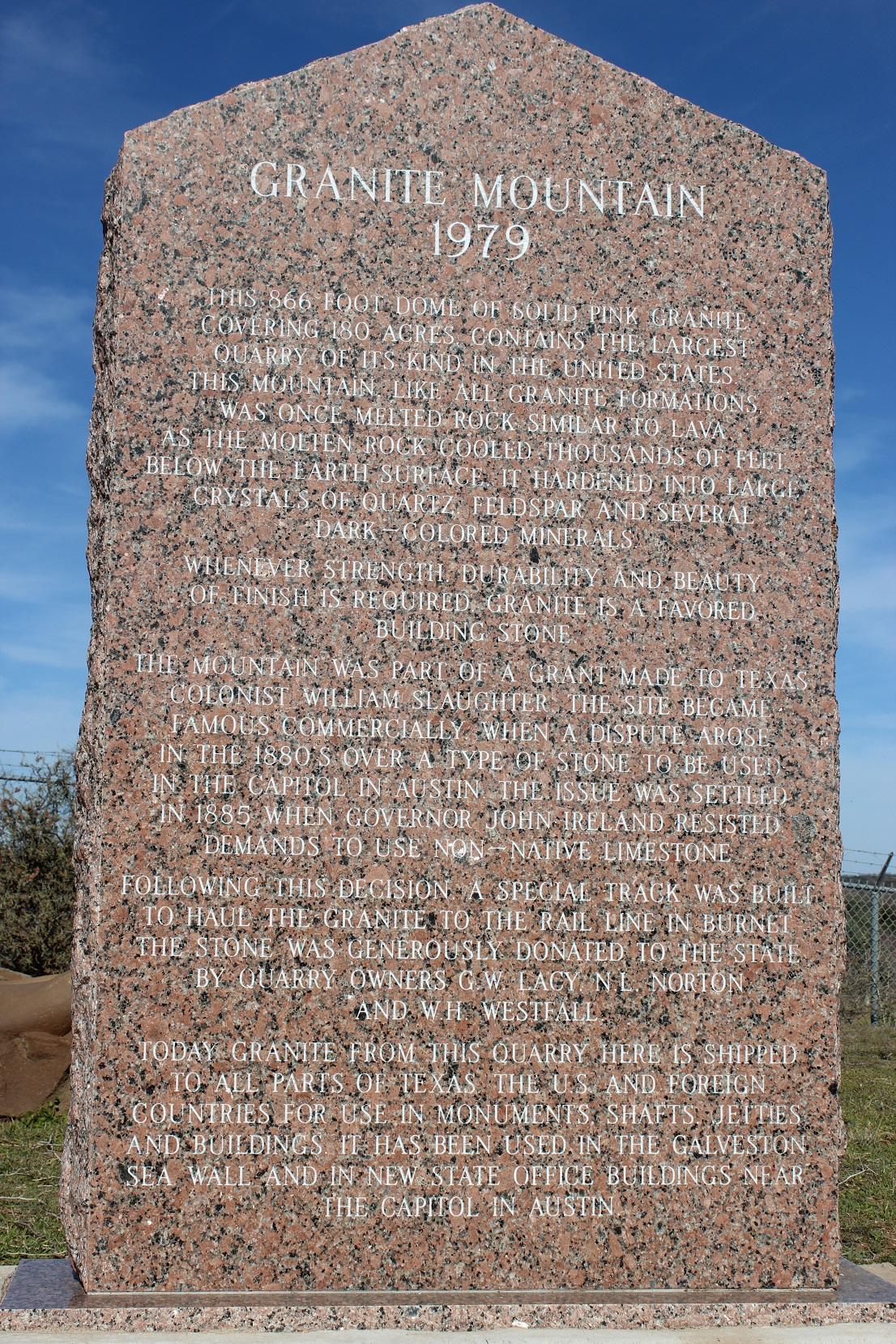
Historical marker

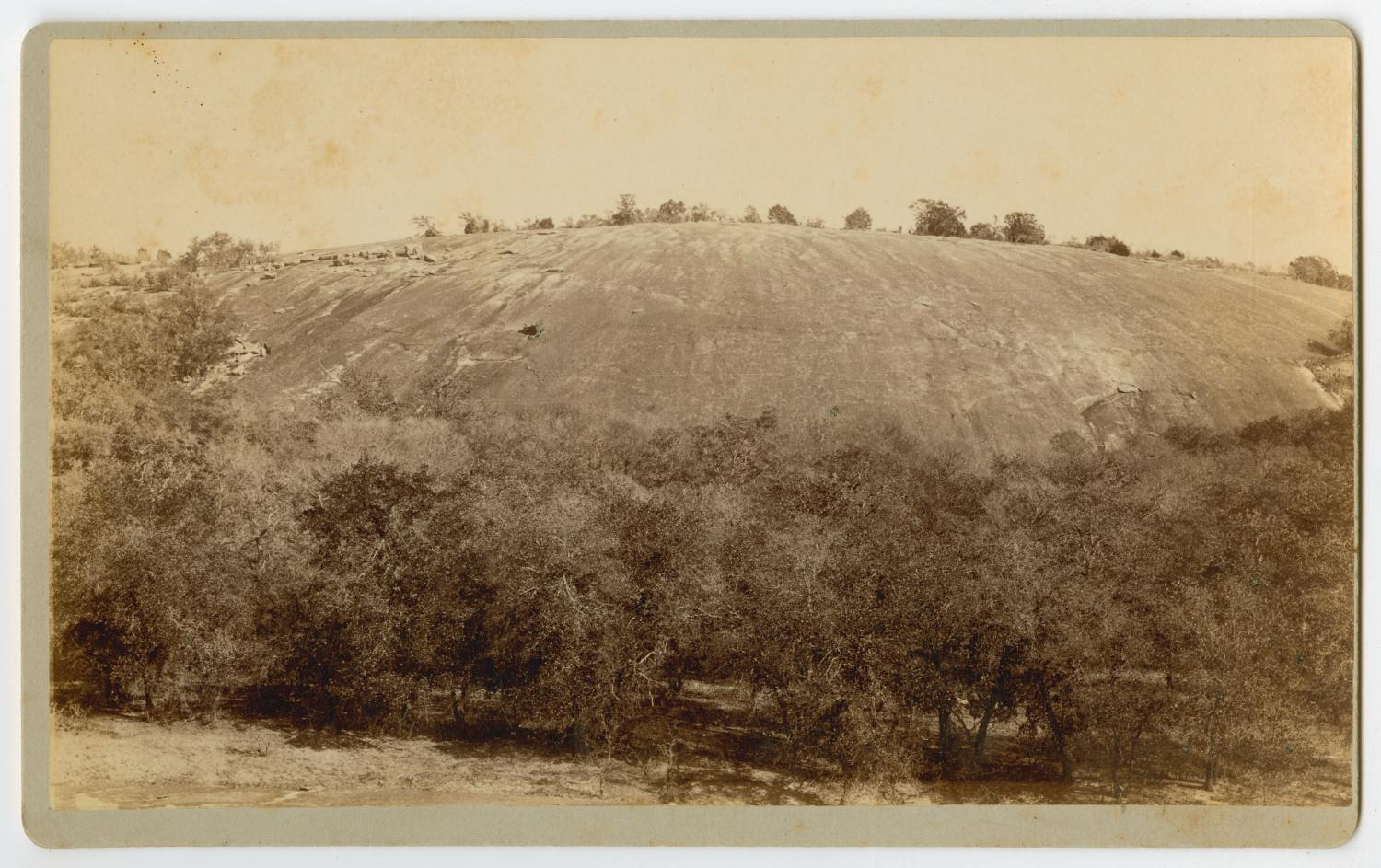
Granite Mountain as it existed in 1890

Granite Mountain is a solid dome, also known as a bornhardt, of pink granite (pink granite is also known as Sunset Red) rising over 860 feet one mile west of Marble Falls, Texas. Since quarry operations began in the late 19th century, the distinctive pink-red colored rock has been used in the construction of the Texas State Capitol in Austin, Texas, and also for the construction of the Galveston Seawall. In 1882, three businessmen and the owners of Granite Mountain, G. W. Lacy (of the Lacy Lans Ranch), N. L. Norton and W. H. Westfall, donated the amount of granite necessary to build the Texas State Capitol. The mountain no longer looks like a geographic feature because of the heavy mining, which has fully covered its surface. A similar but much larger area known as Enchanted Rock State Natural Area can be seen in its undisturbed state west of Marble Falls near Fredericksburg, Texas.

== See also ==
- Llano Uplift
- Geology of Texas
