= AQO =

AQO may refer to:

- Llano Municipal Airport, Texas, United States (IATA code)
- Aluminum Company of America (Alcoa Aircraft Operations), United States (ICAO code)
- Adiabatic Quantum Optimization
