= Sunrise Beach Village, Texas =

- City
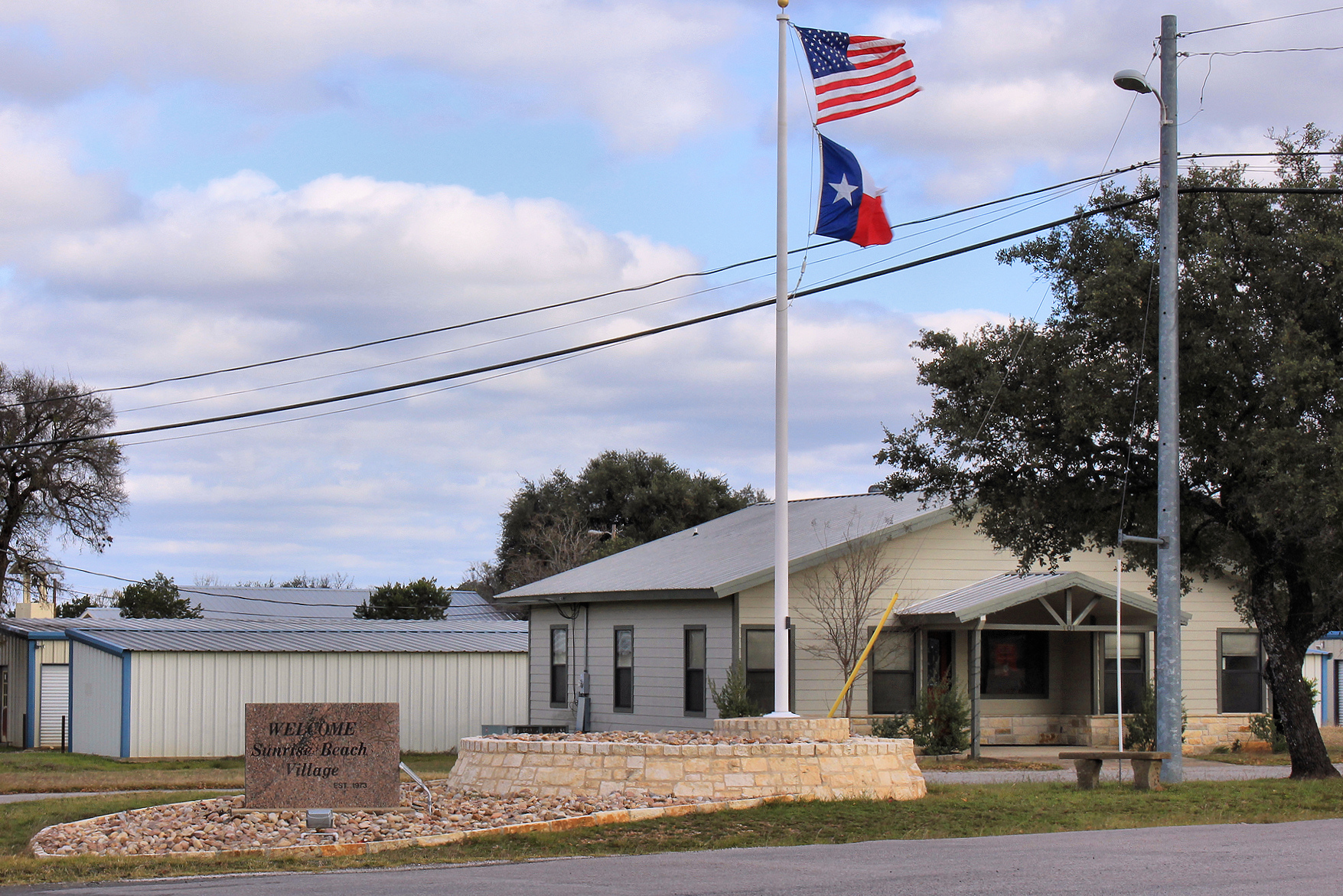

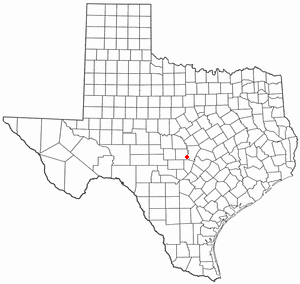
- Location of Sunrise Beach Village, Texas

- Coordinates: 30°35′10″N 98°25′07″W
- Country: United States
- State: Texas
- County: Llano
- Established: 1973

Area
  - Total: 2.29 sq mi (5.94 km^{2})
  - Land: 1.69 sq mi (4.37 km^{2})
  - Water: 0.61 sq mi (1.57 km^{2})
- Elevation: 827 ft (252 m)

Population (2020)
  - Total: 739
  - Density: 438/sq mi (169/km^{2})
- Time zone: UTC-6 (Central (CST))
  - Summer (DST): UTC-5 (CDT)
- FIPS code: 48-71228
- GNIS feature ID: 2412011
- Website: sunrisebeachtx.gov

Sunrise Beach Village is a city in Llano County, Texas, United States. The village was established in 1973. The population was 739 at the 2020 census.

== Geography ==
Sunrise Beach Village is located on the southern shore of Lake Lyndon B. Johnson, 43 miles (69 km) west of Austin.

According to the United States Census Bureau, the city has a total area of 2.3 square miles (6.0 km^{2}), of which 1.6 square miles (4.1 km^{2}) is land and 0.6 square miles (1.6 km^{2}) (27.95%) is water.

== Demographics ==
Historical population
Census	Pop.	Note	%±
1980	420		—
1990	497		18.3%
2000	704		41.6%
2010	713		1.3%
2020	739		3.6%
U.S. Decennial Census

=== 2020 census ===
As of the 2020 census, Sunrise Beach Village had a population of 739 and a median age of 65.3 years.

5.8% of residents were under the age of 18 and 51.2% of residents were 65 years of age or older, with 91.0 males per 100 females overall and 92.3 males per 100 females age 18 and over.

0.0% of residents lived in urban areas, while 100.0% lived in rural areas.

There were 382 households in Sunrise Beach Village, of which 12.6% had children under the age of 18 living in them. Of all households, 60.2% were married-couple households, 16.0% were households with a male householder and no spouse or partner present, and 20.4% were households with a female householder and no spouse or partner present. About 26.9% of all households were made up of individuals and 16.0% had someone living alone who was 65 years of age or older.

There were 962 housing units, of which 60.3% were vacant. The homeowner vacancy rate was 1.1% and the rental vacancy rate was 0.0%.

Racial composition as of the 2020 census
Race	Number	Percent
White	664	89.9%
Black or African American	5	0.7%
American Indian and Alaska Native	3	0.4%
Asian	2	0.3%
Native Hawaiian and Other Pacific Islander	0	0.0%
Some other race	11	1.5%
Two or more races	54	7.3%
Hispanic or Latino (of any race)	29	3.9%

=== 2000 census ===
At the 2000 census, there were 704 people, 354 households and 247 families residing in the city. The population density was 425.5 per square mile (164.3/km^{2}). There were 776 housing units at an average density of 469.0 per square mile (181.1/km^{2}). The racial make-up of the city was 98.72% White, 0.28% African American, 0.14% Native American, 0.14% from other races and 0.71% from two or more races. Hispanic or Latino of any race were 1.14% of the population.

There were 354 households, of which 10.2% had children under the age of 18 living with them, 64.1% were married couples living together, 3.1% had a female householder with no husband present and 30.2% were non-families. 24.3% of all households were made up of individuals, and 13.3% had someone living alone who was 65 years of age or older. The average household size was 1.99 and the average family size was 2.30.

8.9% of the population were under the age of 18, 2.0% from 18 to 24, 14.2% from 25 to 44, 39.3% from 45 to 64 and 35.5% were 65 years of age or older. The median age was 59 years. For every 100 females, there were 93.4 males. For every 100 females age 18 and over, there were 91.3 males.

The median household income was $44,750 and the median family income was $51,776. Males had a median income of $34,531 and females $26,094. The per capita income was $29,433. About 5.1% of families and 5.8% of the population were below the poverty line, including 3.6% of those under age 18 and 8.7% of those age 65 or over.

== Education ==
Sunrise Beach Village is served by the Llano Independent School District.
