= Llanite =

Type of rock

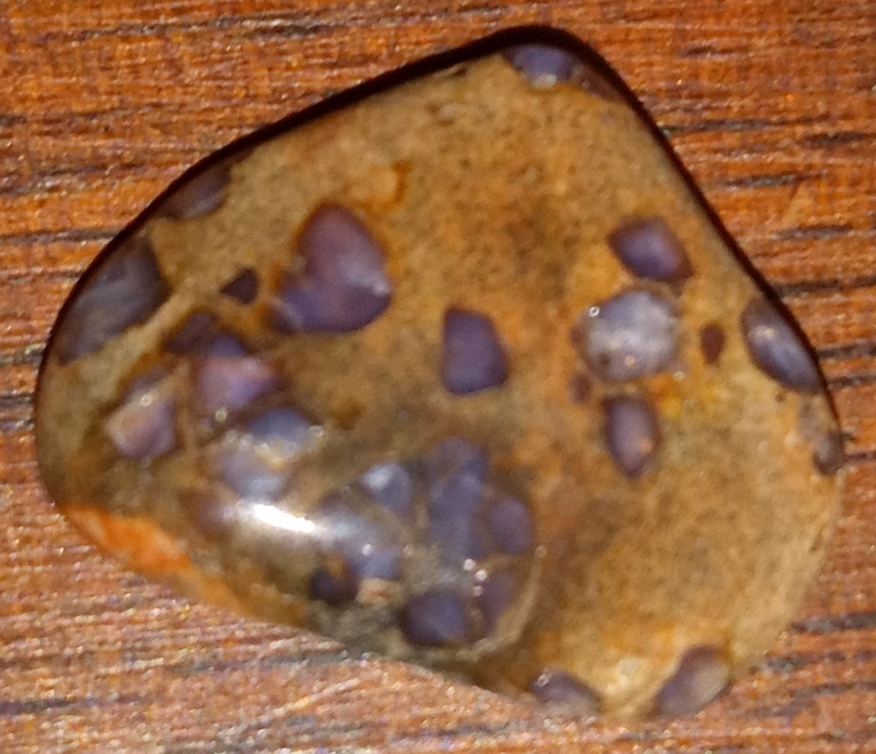
Llanite

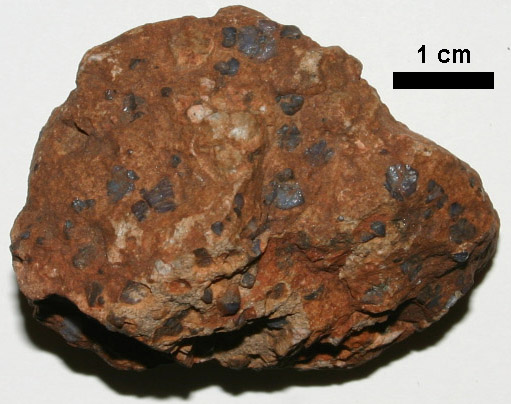
Llanite from the dike on Texas State Highway 16

Llanite is a porphyritic rhyolite with distinctive blue quartz and reddish microcline feldspar phenocrysts found in the Llano Uplift north of Llano, Texas, and dated at 1.1 bya. The purplish-blue color of the quartz is caused by inclusions of ilmenite. It is named after Llano County, Texas.

According to geologist and historian Richard Gibson, referring to the phenocrysts in the aphanitic matrix, "...implies that there were two periods of cooling, one at deeper depths where it took the larger crystals a longer time to cool (and grow), followed by a later, quicker period of cooling, so the matrix crystallized so fast the grains are very small, but the larger, older grains are still there within the matrix". This cooling took place during a time of mountain-building called the Grenville orogeny. The llanite intruded into older rocks as dikes.

Location of Llano County

The geology of northeast Africa is very similar to that of Texas, and many of the two regions' minerals and fossils are only found in these two locations. A dike of llanite crops out on Texas State Highway 16 about nine miles north of the town of Llano.

Llanite has a crushing strength of 37,800 lb/in^{2} or 26,577,180 kg/m^{2}, similar to quartz, due to a mineral content of quartz (35%), microcline (28%), plagioclase (28%), and biotite (9%).

== See also ==
- Porphyry
