= James Fields Smathers =

American inventor (1888-1967)

- Born: March 12, 1888; Valley Spring, Llano County, Texas, United States
- Died: August 7, 1967 (aged 79); Poughkeepsie, New York
- Resting place: Poughkeepsie Rural Cemetery
- Known for: First practical electric typewriter (1920)
- Spouse: Mildred Eloise Gill Smathers
- Children: 2

James Fields Smathers (February 12, 1888 – August 7, 1967) was an American inventor who created what is considered the first practical power-operated typewriter.

== Early life ==
Smathers was born on a farm near Valley Spring, Texas, the son of James Jefferson and Harriet Olenzo Smathers. After attending the local one-room country school he entered Texas Christian University in 1904. He finished business school, taught shorthand and typing for a year, and in 1908 became typist, accountant, and credit manager to a company in Kansas City, Missouri.

== Career ==
Smathers realized during the course of his employment that there was a great need for some method of increasing the speed and decreasing the operator fatigue of typing, and it seemed obvious to him that electric power was the answer. By late 1912 he had produced a working model of his electric typewriter and applied for a patent, which was issued the following year.

He continued developing his idea until in September 1914 he produced a perfected model that performed perfectly. In 1920 he obtained an extension of his early patent because of the delay caused in his work by his military service in Europe during World War I.

In 1923 the Northeast Electric Company of Rochester, New York entered into a contract with Smathers for the production of electric typewriters. Northeast was interested in finding new markets for their electric motors and developed Smathers' design so that it could be marketed to typewriter manufacturers, and from 1925 Remington Electric typewriters were produced powered by Northeast's motors.

After some 2,500 electric typewriters had been produced, Northeast asked Remington for a firm contract for the next batch. However, Remington was engaged in merger talks which would eventually result in the creation of Remington Rand and no executives were willing to commit to a firm order. Northeast instead decided to enter the typewriter business for itself, and in 1929 produced the first Electromatic Typewriter.

In 1928 General Motors' Delco division purchased Northeast Electric, and the typewriter business was spun off as the Electromatic Typewriters, Inc., and in 1933 Electromatic was acquired by IBM and the typewriter sold as the IBM Electromatic. Smathers joined IBM's Rochester staff in 1938 as a consultant and worked in development engineering at Poughkeepsie until his retirement in 1953.

Smathers died on August 7, 1967, in Poughkeepsie, New York, and was buried in Poughkeepsie Rural Cemetery. He was survived by his wife, Mildred Eloise Gill Smathers, and a son, Frank Gill Smathers and daughter, Shirlianne Smathers Phelps.

== Awards ==
- The Franklin Institute of Pennsylvania awarded Smathers the Edward Longstreth Medal "for ingenuity in the invention of the electric typewriter."
- In 1945 the Rochester Museum of Arts and Sciences awarded him Smathers a Fellowship for the invention of a mechanism for proportional spacing.
- In 1966 the Alumni Association of Texas Christian University recognized Smathers as a "distinguished alumnus."
