= Residuum (geology) =

Weathered rock that is not transported by erosion

Residuum is weathered rock that is not transported by erosion, contributing in time to the formation of soil. It is distinguished from other types of parent material in that it is composed solely of mineral, not organic, material, and it remains in place rather than being moved by the action of wind, water, or gravity.

== Characteristics ==
Parent material is one of the soil forming factors defined as “unconsolidated organic and mineral materials in which soils form”. Making parent material an important part of the soil forming process. The other soil forming factors are climate, organisms, relief and time. Parent materials that are not residual are classified by their mode of transport into a system. These modes of transport are by wind (aeolian), water, gravity (colluvial), ice (glacial till), lakes (lacustrine), oceans (marine) or in place (non transported).

Soils derived from residuum are called residual soils. These soils are expected to be mineralogically similar to their underlying bedrock. While residuum is similar to the term regolith, it is more specific. While regolith refers to all unconsolidated earth materials above the solid bed rock, including transported sediments such as sand or alluvium, residuum is strictly a non transported parent material. However, parent materials formed in place or "in-situ" can further be classified as saprolite or residuum. Residuum differs from saprolite through its structure and degree of weathering. Saprolite is commonly referring to weathered material retaining details or structural features of the bedrock. The distinguishing feature between these is that residuum no longer retains the structural features or details of its bed rock. It has undergone greater transformation and experienced a decrease in volume from its origins as saprolite and bedrock. This is what is known as consolidation.

== Production ==
Residuum and their associated residual soils are a produced primarily through chemical weathering of their bedrock. Residuum occurs in all temperature regimes and locations. Their thickness varies with climates. In temperate climate its presence is in relatively lower amounts occurring as a "thin blanket of loose material above the bedrock. In tropical climates it can be much thicker". A certain degree of landscape stability is inferred for residual soils. Identification and survey of these soils are most conclusive "where fresh outcrops are rare and all surface materials look alike". In contrast, "a decrease in the amount of rock fragments as depth increases, especially over saprolite, indicates that the soil materials probably has been transported down slope". Identification of residuum is relevant in soil science and geology because accurate identification conveys direct and implicit info about soil itself, the environment in which it formed, and its current environment. Soils provide a records of prevailing and past environments climates and human activities and much more.

In limestone terrains the boundary between bedrock and residuum is commonly very sharp, but may be highly irregular, defining pinnacles and even isolated blocks of fresh bedrock surrounded by reddish residual silts and clays derived from its decomposition. Resistant materials such as chert, silicified fossils, or beds of sandstone remain and may concentrate on the surface as float.
