= Llano Independent School District =

School district in Texas, United States

- 1400 Oatman Street Llano, Texas, 78643

District information
- Grades: PK–12
- Schools: 4

Students and staff
- Students: 1,942
- Teachers: 152.98 (on an FTE basis)
- Student–teacher ratio: 12.69:1

Other information
- Website: www.llanoisd.org

Llano Independent School District is a public county-wide school district for Llano County, Texas (USA).

The county-wide district serves the cities of Llano and Sunrise Beach Village, the community of Kingsland, and a portion of Horseshoe Bay as well as the rural areas of Llano County.

In 2009, the school district was rated "academically acceptable" by the Texas Education Agency.

== Schools ==
Llano ISD has four schools - Llano High School, Llano Junior High, Llano Elementary, and Packsaddle Elementary located in Kingsland. Their school colors are orange and black and their mascot is the Yellow Jacket.

=== High school ===
AAA

- Llano High School (Llano; Grades 9-12)

A new high school was built in 2000 with classes beginning Fall 2000. The previous high school is now the middle school just down the road. The Yellow Jacket football team still plays at Llano Stadium next to the middle school. The tennis courts, which were recently remodeled, are also located by Llano Middle School.

=== Middle school ===
- Llano Junior High School (Llano; Grades 6-8)

=== Primary schools ===
- Llano Elementary School (Llano; Grades PK-5)
- Packsaddle Elementary School (Kingsland; Grades PK-5)
