= Llano High School =

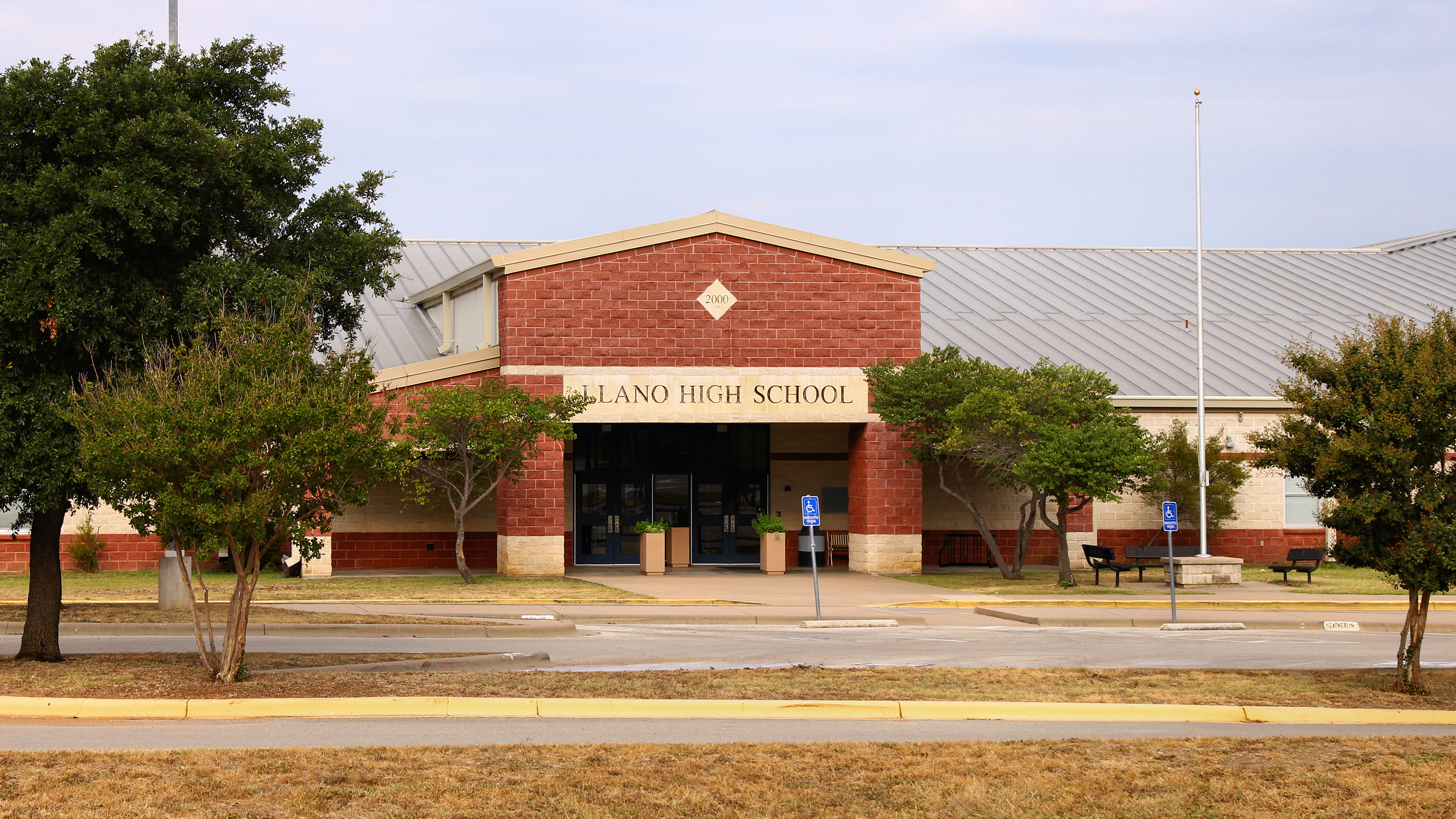

Location
- 2509 Hwy 16 S Llano, Texas 78643-2734; United States; 30.7329°N 98.6819°W

Information
- School type: Public high school
- School district: Llano Independent School District
- Principal: Scott Patrick
- Staff: 45.73 (FTE)
- Grades: 9-12
- Enrollment: 535 (2023-2024)
- Student to teacher ratio: 11.70
- Colors: Black & Orange
- Athletics conference: UIL Class AAA
- Mascot: Yellow Jacket
- Website: Llano High School

Llano High School is a public high school located in Llano, Texas, United States that classified as a 3A school by the University Interscholastic League (UIL). It is part of the Llano Independent School District located in central Llano County. In 2013, the school was rated "Met Standard" by the Texas Education Agency.

== Athletics ==
The Llano Yellow Jackets compete in the following sports

Cross Country, Volleyball, Football, Basketball, Powerlifting, Golf, Tennis, Track, Softball & Baseball

=== State Titles ===
- Girls Basketball
  - 2002(3A)
- Girls Cross Country
  - 2000(3A)

== Band ==
The Llano Yellow Jacket Band has won 38 consecutive first division marching awards, going back to 1979. It has also made a handful of state marching contest appearances, the most recent being in 2004 when the band made the state finals. The Yellow Jacket Band placed in the top five in the state in 1983, 1985 and 1987.

== UIL Academic State Meet Titles ==
- Journalism
  - 2007(3A)
