= Llano Municipal Airport =

Coordinates: 30°47′01″N 098°39′43″W

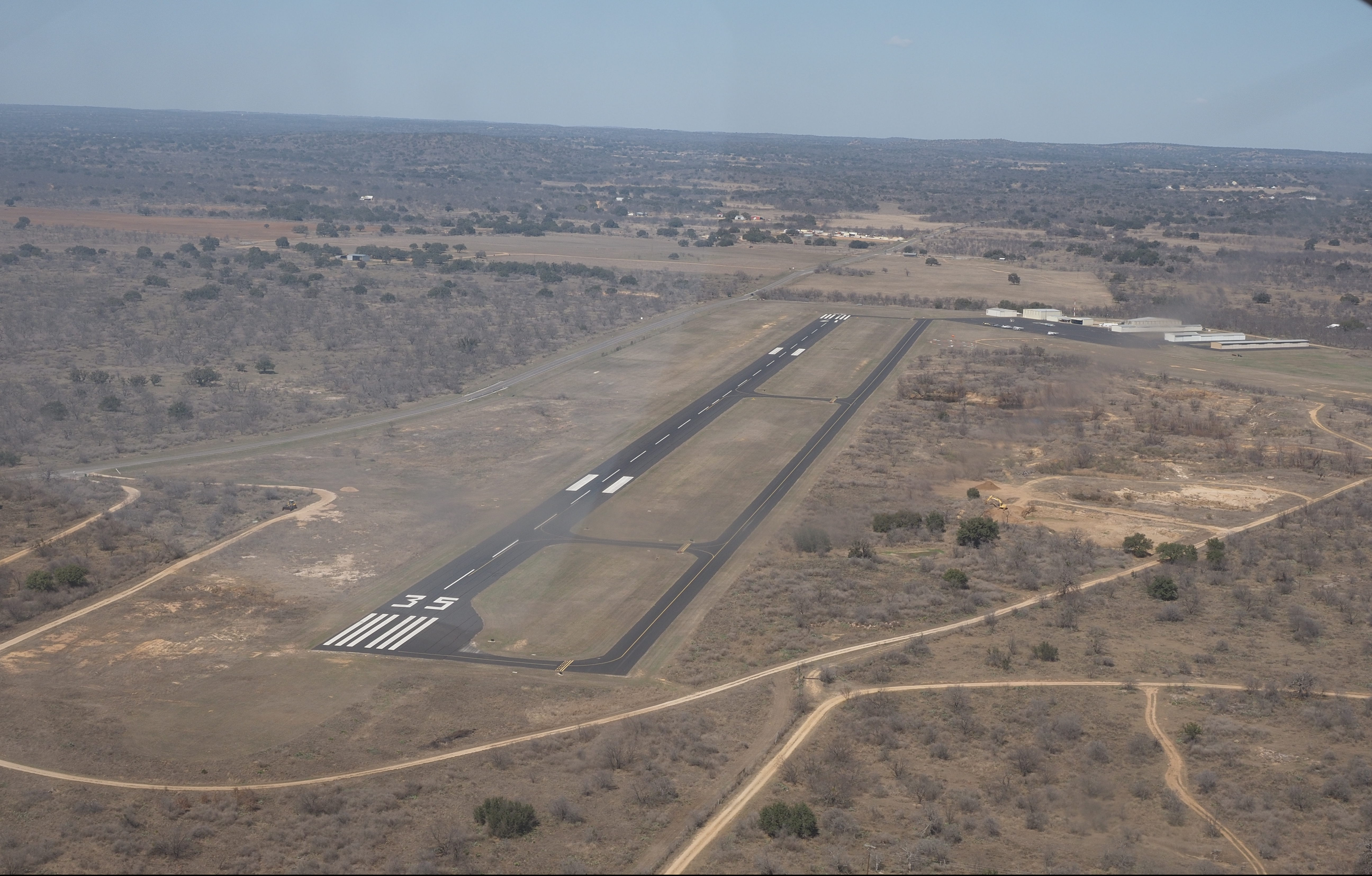
- IATA: none; ICAO: KAQO; FAA LID: AQO

Summary
- Airport type: Public
- Owner: City of Llano
- Serves: Llano, Texas
- Elevation AMSL: 1,102 ft / 336 m
- Website: www.llanotx.com/...

Map

Runways
Direction	Length		Surface
Direction	ft	m	Surface
17/35	4,202	1,281	Asphalt
13/31	3,240	988	Turf

Statistics (2006)
- Aircraft operations: 11,100
- Based aircraft: 41
- Source: Federal Aviation Administration

Llano Municipal Airport (ICAO: KAQO, FAA LID: AQO) is two miles northeast of Llano, in Llano County, Texas.

Most U.S. airports use the same three-letter location identifier for the FAA and IATA, but Llano Municipal is AQO to the FAA and has no IATA code. The airport's former FAA identifier was 6R9.

== Facilities ==
The airport covers 95 acres (38 ha) and has two runways: 17/35 is 4,202 x 75 ft (1,281 x 23 m) asphalt and 13/31 is 3,240 x 150 ft (988 x 46 m) turf.

In the year ending March 10, 2006 the airport had 11,100 aircraft operations, average 30 per day, all general aviation. 41 aircraft are based at this airport: 90% single-engine, 5% glider and 5% ultralight.

== See also ==
- List of airports in Texas
