= Llano, Texas =

- City
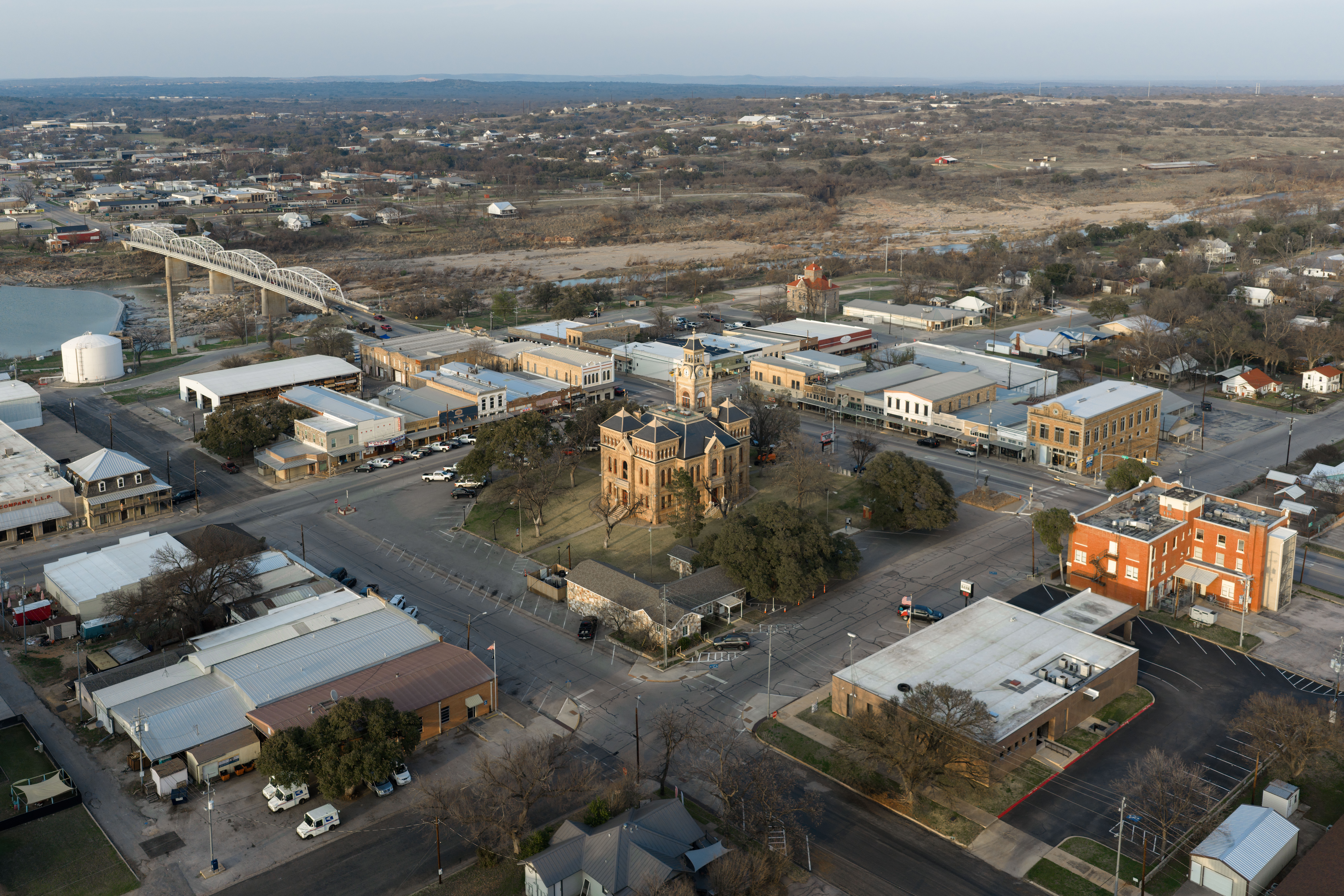
- Downtown

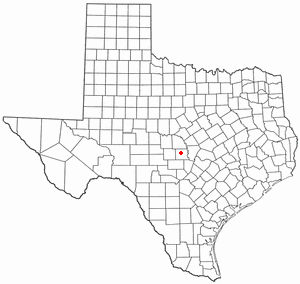
- Location of Llano, Texas

- Coordinates: 30°44′52″N 98°40′33″W
- Country: United States
- State: Texas
- County: Llano

Area
  - Total: 5.59 sq mi (14.48 km^{2})
  - Land: 5.27 sq mi (13.65 km^{2})
  - Water: 0.32 sq mi (0.83 km^{2})
- Elevation: 1,024 ft (312 m)

Population (2020)
  - Total: 3,325
  - Density: 630.9/sq mi (243.6/km^{2})
- Demonym: Llanite
- Time zone: UTC-6 (Central (CST))
  - Summer (DST): UTC-5 (CDT)
- ZIP code: 78643
- Area code: 325
- FIPS code: 48-43144
- GNIS feature ID: 2410852
- Website: cityofllano.com

Llano (/ˈlænoʊ/ LAN-oh) is a city in and the county seat of Llano County, Texas, United States. As of 2020, the city population was 3,325. Llano has been described as the "deer capital of Texas", with the single highest density of white-tailed deer in the United States.

== History ==
Llano County was established in compliance with a February 1, 1856, state legislative act. The Llano River location was chosen in an election held on June 14, 1856, under a live oak on the south bank of the river, near the present site of Roy Inks Bridge in Llano. Into the 1870s, the town was little more than a frontier trading center, with a few log buildings housing business establishments, a post office, and a few homes. In 1879, the first bank, Moore, Foster, and Company, was founded, and during the 1880s, Llano acquired a number of new enterprises that served the county's farmers and ranchers. After the county outgrew the one-story stone building that had housed its public offices, in 1885, an ornate brick courthouse was completed on the square on the south side of the river. A fire on January 22, 1892, destroyed this courthouse; the present county courthouse was completed and occupied on August 1, 1893. It is listed in the National Register of Historic Places.

In the 1880s the Llano Rural, the town's first newspaper, was established, followed by the Iron City News, the name of which reflects growing interest in the county's mineral resources. The Rural eventually incorporated several other newspapers, including the Advocate, the Searchlight, and the Gazette, to become the Llano News by the early 1900s. The Llano Times was where J. Marvin Hunter, author and historian of the American West, worked on the staff for a brief time early in the 20th century.

Anticipation of significant economic growth based on the iron deposits discovered at Iron Mountain in northwestern Llano County attracted capital from Dallas and from northern states, and the boom years of Llano-from 1886 to 1893-were launched. The Llano Improvement and Furnace Company undertook plans for an iron furnace and foundry, and the development of commercial real estate, on the hitherto undeveloped north side of the river. Charters were undertaken for a dam, an electric power plant, a streetcar system, and electric street lights, while expectations of growth were high. Steel-town names such as Birmingham, Pittsburgh, and Bessemer were chosen for streets on the north side; Llano was to be the "Pittsburgh of the West", but only a small dam and the street lighting were completed. By one report, the population reached 7,000 in 1890. In 1892, at the peak of the boom period, the town was incorporated, the river was bridged, and the Austin and Northwestern Railroad was extended to a terminal on the north side of Llano. Because of the improved transportation, several granite-cutting and -finishing businesses moved to town in this period. Many of the new businesses were begun in the boom period, and substantial brick establishments were constructed around the public square on the north side of the river. Among these, the Algona Hotel became a focal point for the town's new social life. It was damaged by a cyclone in 1900, and burned to the ground in 1923. Because the county's mineral resources, with the significant exception of granite, did not exist in commercially exploitable concentrations, the boom period soon faded. Plans to connect Llano with Fredericksburg via an extension of the San Antonio and Aransas Pass Railway were not fulfilled. A series of fires in the early 1890s, probably set to collect insurance on unprofitable properties, destroyed many of the new business establishments. Such fires were so numerous, fire insurance was denied to the town for several years.

Farming, ranching, and the granite industry remained the foundations of the town's economy in the 20th century. In the 1920s, Llano was a major shipping point for cattle; the cotton industry flourished in the county through the 1930s, but declined thereafter into insignificance. Granite quarrying and finishing retained their importance, amounting to a million-dollar-a-year industry by the 1950s. The Roy Inks Bridge, named for a former mayor, was built after a flood crest of 42 feet in 1935 swept away the 1892 structure. By 1964, the town had a new hospital, a post office, school buildings, a community center, a rodeo area, and a golf course, along with a city park and improved water system. Llano was an important link in the Highland Lakes chain of tourist areas, and attracted many hunters during the deer season. A winery, feed processing, and insecticide and commercial talc production represented new industry. Actress Sophia Loren, friend and correspondent of the Netherlands native Anthony Goossens, priest of Holy Trinity Catholic Church in Llano, contributed to the church fund-raising campaign in 1975. By 1983, the National Register of Historic Places listed, in addition to the courthouse, the Llano jail, the Southern Hotel, and the Badu Building, former bank and home of French immigrant and mineralogist N. J. Badu, now a bed-and-breakfast establishment.

=== Book bans ===
In 2021 County Judge Ron Cunningham removed books, such as In the Night Kitchen, from the shelves of the main library because they contained nudity. He also ordered librarians to pause buying new material and to purge any other books containing nudity. County commissioners dissolved the library board in 2022. The replacement board voted unanimously to close its meetings to the public to prevent observers from taking notes on the meetings. It removed more books, including Caste: The Origins of Our Discontents.

=== Gallery ===
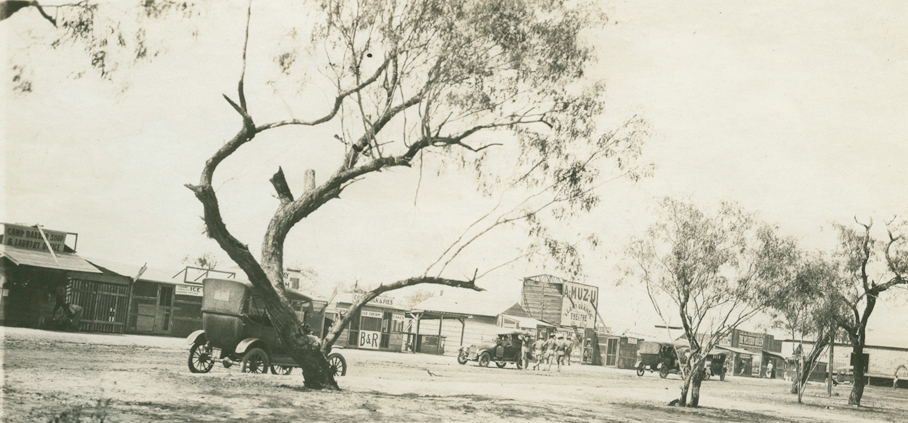
Storefronts in Llano, Texas around 1912, from an old postcard.

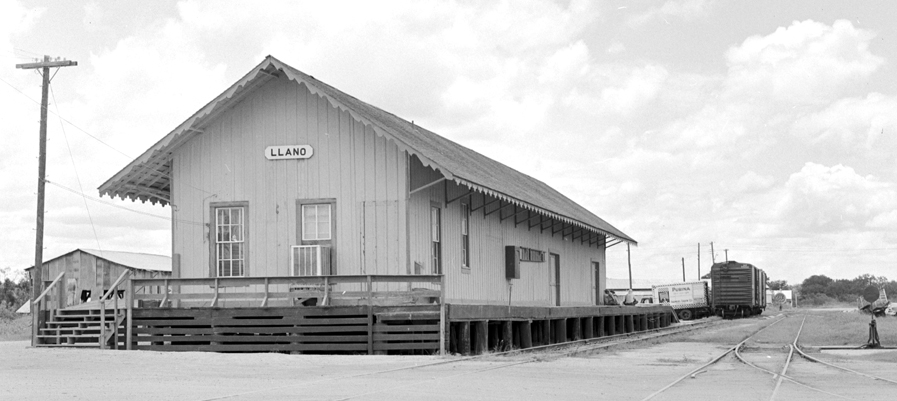
Texas and New Orleans, Southern Pacific Railroad Station, Llano. 1957 photo.

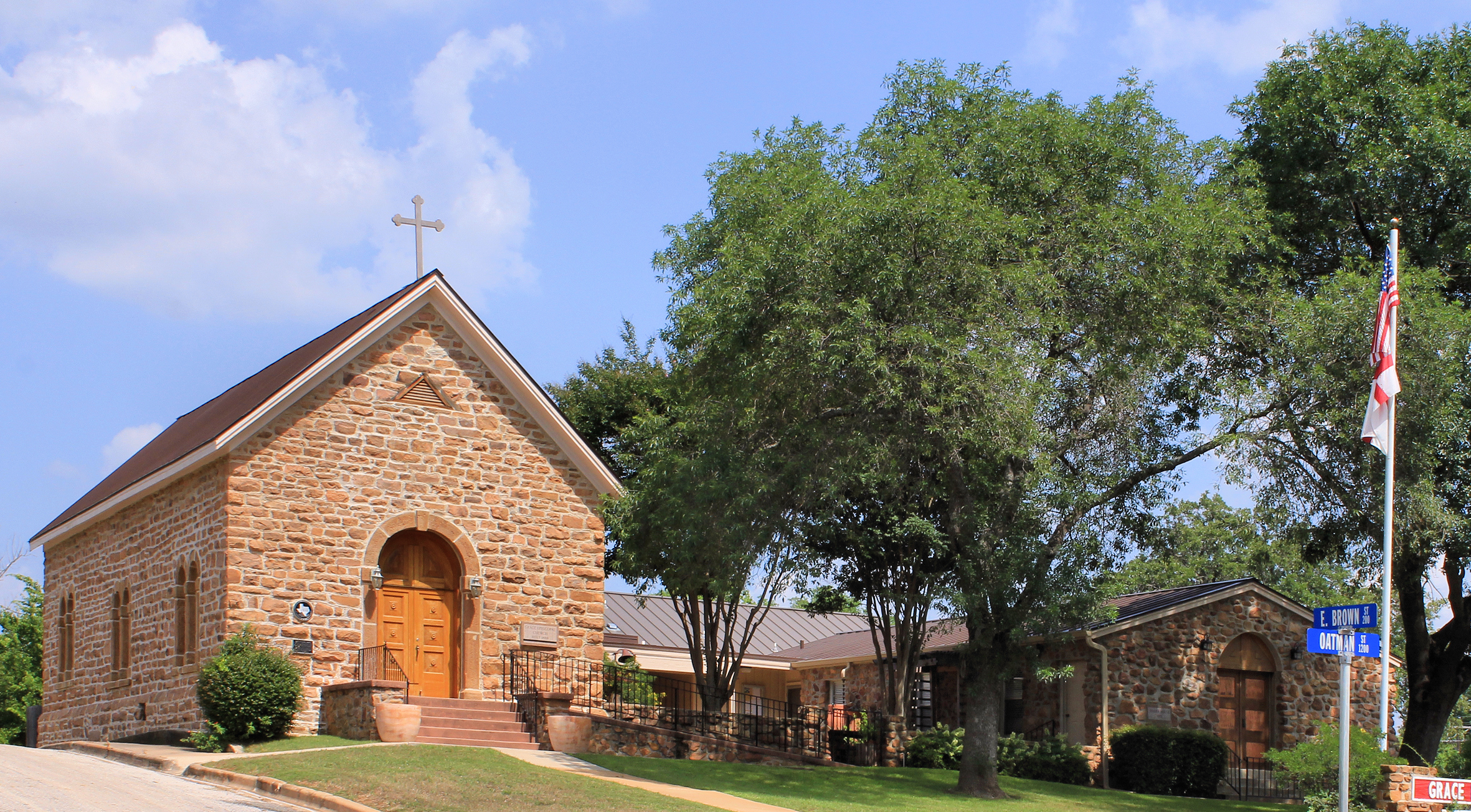
Grace Episcopal Church, Llano. Building was completed 1889. Recorded Texas Historic Landmark – 1965.

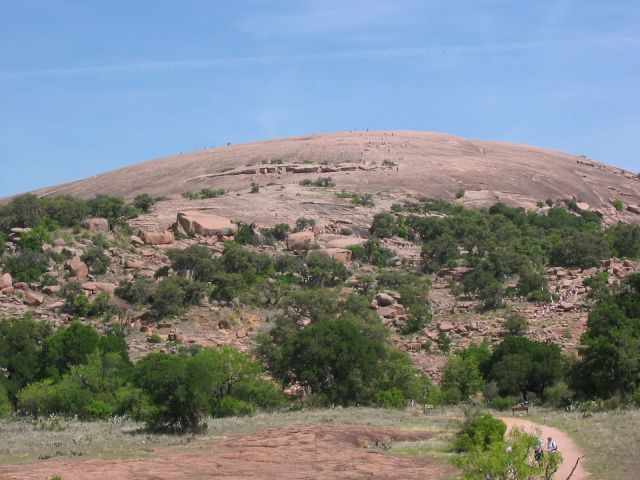
Enchanted Rock in 2006. Enchanted Rock State Natural Area was designated a Recorded Texas Historic Landmark in 1936.

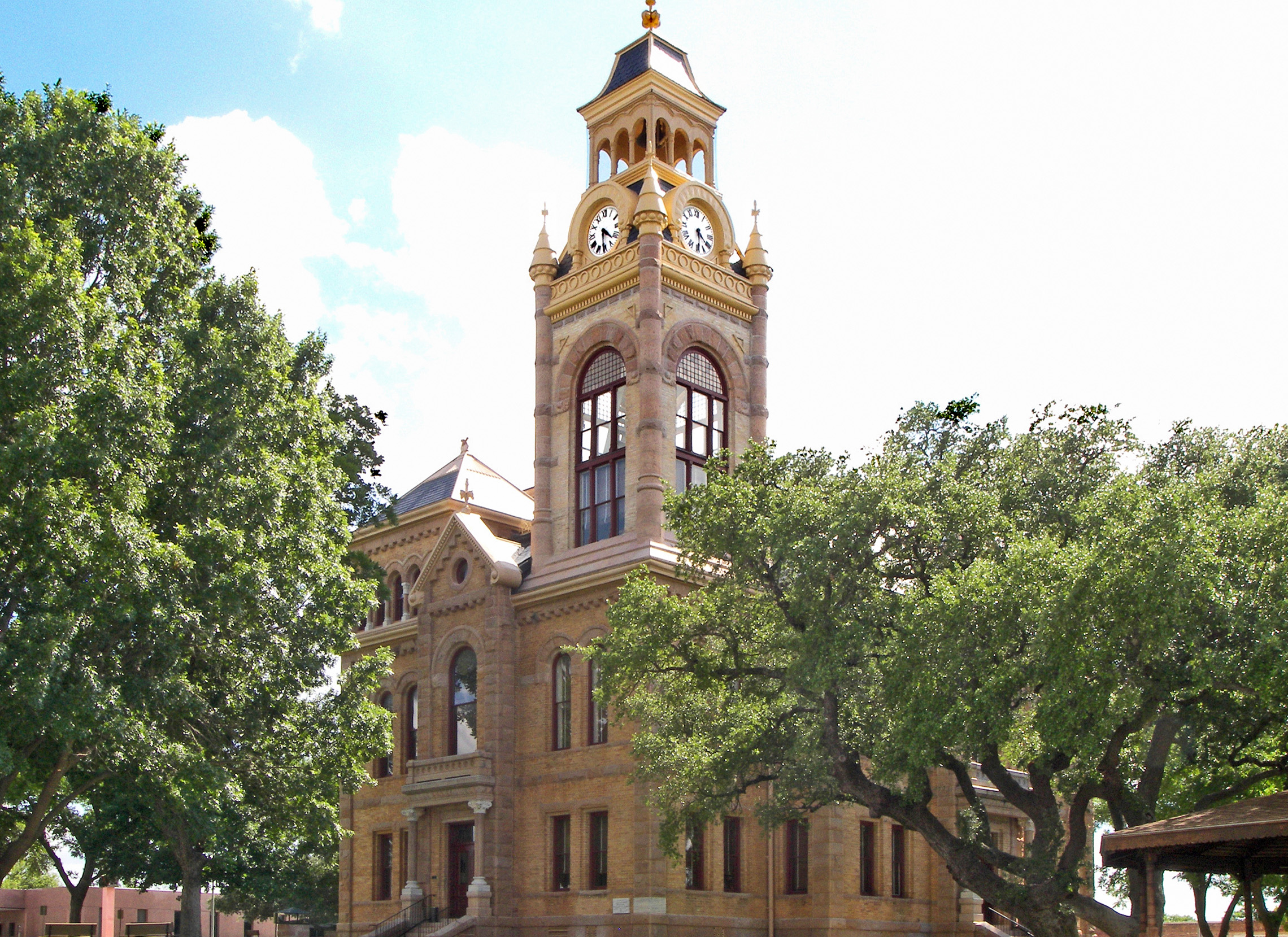
The Llano County Courthouse

== Geography ==
Llano is located on the Llano River, 65 miles (105 km) northwest of Austin and 102 mi (164 km) north of San Antonio.

According to the United States Census Bureau, the city has a total area of 4.7 sq mi (12 km^{2}), of which 0.3 sq mi (0.78 km^{2}) of it (5.53%) is covered by water.

=== 2018 flood ===
In October 2018, Llano experienced heavy rainfall and flooding following Hurricane Sergio. Rainfall in Llano exceeded 9.8 inches (250 mm) and the level of Llano River rose about 30 feet (9.1 m) in 12 hours. The body of an unidentified woman was found on the banks alongside the Colorado River following the flooding in Llano.

=== Climate ===
Llano experiences a humid subtropical climate (Köppen: Cfa), with hot summers and generally mild winters. Temperature averages range from 84 °F (29 °C) in the summer to 46 °F (7.8 °C) during winter.

Climate data for Llano, Texas (1991–2020 normals, extremes 1902–present)
Month	Jan	Feb	Mar	Apr	May	Jun	Jul	Aug	Sep	Oct	Nov	Dec	Year
Record high °F (°C)	96 (36)	100 (38)	100 (38)	105 (41)	108 (42)	112 (44)	115 (46)	113 (45)	112 (44)	105 (41)	94 (34)	93 (34)	115 (46)
Mean maximum °F (°C)	81.0 (27.2)	84.2 (29.0)	89.1 (31.7)	93.6 (34.2)	97.2 (36.2)	100.8 (38.2)	102.5 (39.2)	103.6 (39.8)	99.6 (37.6)	94.2 (34.6)	85.8 (29.9)	81.2 (27.3)	105.2 (40.7)
Mean daily maximum °F (°C)	62.2 (16.8)	66.0 (18.9)	72.8 (22.7)	80.0 (26.7)	86.1 (30.1)	92.8 (33.8)	96.3 (35.7)	96.8 (36.0)	90.5 (32.5)	81.6 (27.6)	71.2 (21.8)	63.6 (17.6)	80.0 (26.7)
Daily mean °F (°C)	47.9 (8.8)	52.3 (11.3)	59.2 (15.1)	66.7 (19.3)	74.8 (23.8)	81.6 (27.6)	84.5 (29.2)	84.6 (29.2)	78.1 (25.6)	68.2 (20.1)	57.4 (14.1)	49.5 (9.7)	67.1 (19.5)
Mean daily minimum °F (°C)	33.6 (0.9)	38.6 (3.7)	45.6 (7.6)	53.4 (11.9)	63.5 (17.5)	70.4 (21.3)	72.8 (22.7)	72.4 (22.4)	65.6 (18.7)	54.9 (12.7)	43.6 (6.4)	35.4 (1.9)	54.2 (12.3)
Mean minimum °F (°C)	19.0 (−7.2)	23.0 (−5.0)	26.2 (−3.2)	35.1 (1.7)	47.5 (8.6)	60.8 (16.0)	66.5 (19.2)	64.4 (18.0)	49.9 (9.9)	35.9 (2.2)	25.1 (−3.8)	20.5 (−6.4)	16.4 (−8.7)
Record low °F (°C)	−6 (−21)	−3 (−19)	14 (−10)	25 (−4)	34 (1)	38 (3)	55 (13)	46 (8)	35 (2)	23 (−5)	15 (−9)	−7 (−22)	−7 (−22)
Average precipitation inches (mm)	1.50 (38)	1.67 (42)	2.43 (62)	2.14 (54)	3.86 (98)	3.27 (83)	1.82 (46)	1.59 (40)	2.34 (59)	3.00 (76)	2.07 (53)	1.88 (48)	27.57 (700)
Average snowfall inches (cm)	0.0 (0.0)	0.1 (0.25)	0.0 (0.0)	0.0 (0.0)	0.0 (0.0)	0.0 (0.0)	0.0 (0.0)	0.0 (0.0)	0.0 (0.0)	0.0 (0.0)	0.0 (0.0)	0.0 (0.0)	0.1 (0.25)
Average precipitation days (≥ 0.01 in)	5.2	5.1	6.0	4.8	6.7	5.2	4.4	4.8	4.9	6.2	5.2	5.4	63.9
Average snowy days (≥ 0.1 in)	0.0	0.0	0.0	0.0	0.0	0.0	0.0	0.0	0.0	0.0	0.0	0.0	0.0
Source: NOAA

== Demographics ==
Historical population
Census	Pop.	Note	%±
1860	77		—
1870	188		144.2%
1880	213		13.3%
1910	1,687		—
1920	1,645		−2.5%
1930	2,124		29.1%
1940	2,658		25.1%
1950	2,954		11.1%
1960	2,656		−10.1%
1970	2,608		−1.8%
1980	3,071		17.8%
1990	2,962		−3.5%
2000	3,325		12.3%
2010	3,232		−2.8%
2020	3,325		2.9%
U.S. Decennial Census

=== 2020 census ===
As of the 2020 census, Llano had a population of 3,325, a median age of 46.0 years, 20.9% of residents under 18, and 24.3% 65 or older; there were 88.9 males for every 100 females and 85.2 males for every 100 females age 18 and over.

0.0% of residents lived in urban areas, while 100.0% lived in rural areas.

There were 1,413 households in Llano; 27.5% had children under 18, 44.9% were married-couple households, 17.4% were male householders with no spouse or partner present, 32.1% were female householders with no spouse or partner present, 32.1% were individuals, and 17.4% had someone living alone who was 65 or older.

There were 1,684 housing units, of which 16.1% were vacant; the homeowner vacancy rate was 2.2% and the rental vacancy rate was 9.6%.

Racial composition as of the 2020 census
Race	Number	Percent
White	2,783	83.7%
Black or African American	5	0.2%
American Indian and Alaska Native	19	0.6%
Asian	51	1.5%
Native Hawaiian and Other Pacific Islander	0	0.0%
Some other race	161	4.8%
Two or more races	306	9.2%
Hispanic or Latino (of any race)	461	13.9%

=== 2000 census ===
As of the census of 2000, 3,325 people, 1,353 households, and 880 families resided in the city. The population density was 748.1 inhabitants per square mile (288.8/km^{2}). The 1,539 housing units averaged 346.3/sq mi (133.8/km^{2}) in density. The racial makeup of the city was 94.35% White, 0.57% African American, 0.66% Native American, 0.24% Asian, 3.40% from other races, and 0.78% from two or more races. Hispanics or Latinos of any race were 8.90% of the population.

Of the 1,353 households, 28.8% had children under 18 living with them, 48.6% were married couples living together, 12.9% had a female householder with no husband present, and 34.9% were not families. About 31.3% of all households were made up of individuals, and 18.2% had someone living alone who was 65 or older. The average household size was 2.35, and the average family size was 2.95.

In the city, the age distribution was 24.5% under 18, 7.2% from 18 to 24, 23.9% from 25 to 44, 22.4% from 45 to 64, and 22.0% who were 65 or older. The median age was 41 years. For every 100 females, there were 89.9 males. For every 100 females age 18 and over, there were 83.1 males.

The median income for a household in the city was $31,706, and for a family was $38,125. Males had a median income of $29,464 versus $19,958 for females. The per capita income for the city was $16,306. About 7.7% of families and 10.2% of the population were below the poverty line, including 13.8% of those under age 18 and 2.6% of those age 65 or over.

== Registered historical places ==
=== Badu Building ===
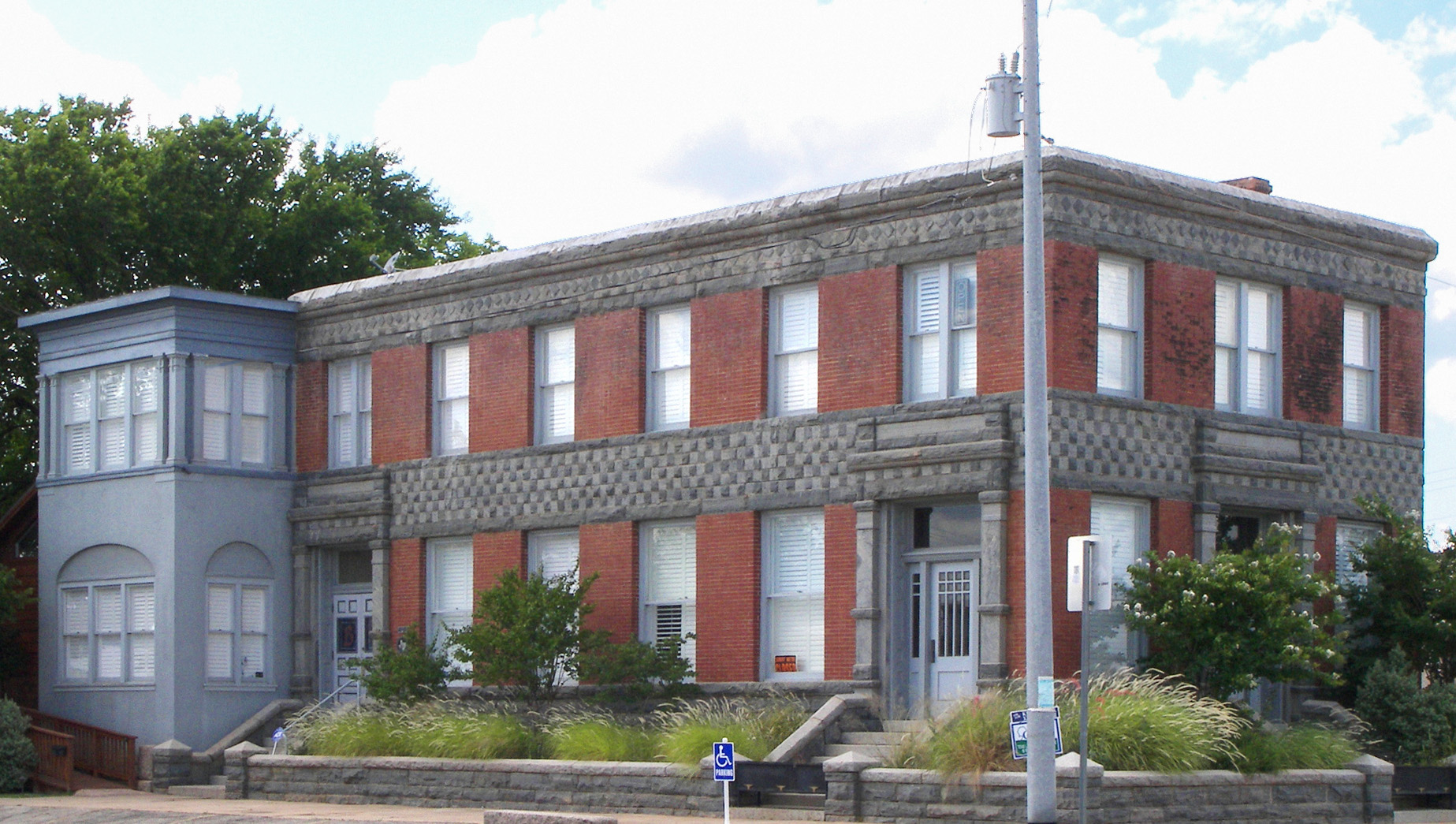
Badu Building in 2010

=== Southern Hotel ===
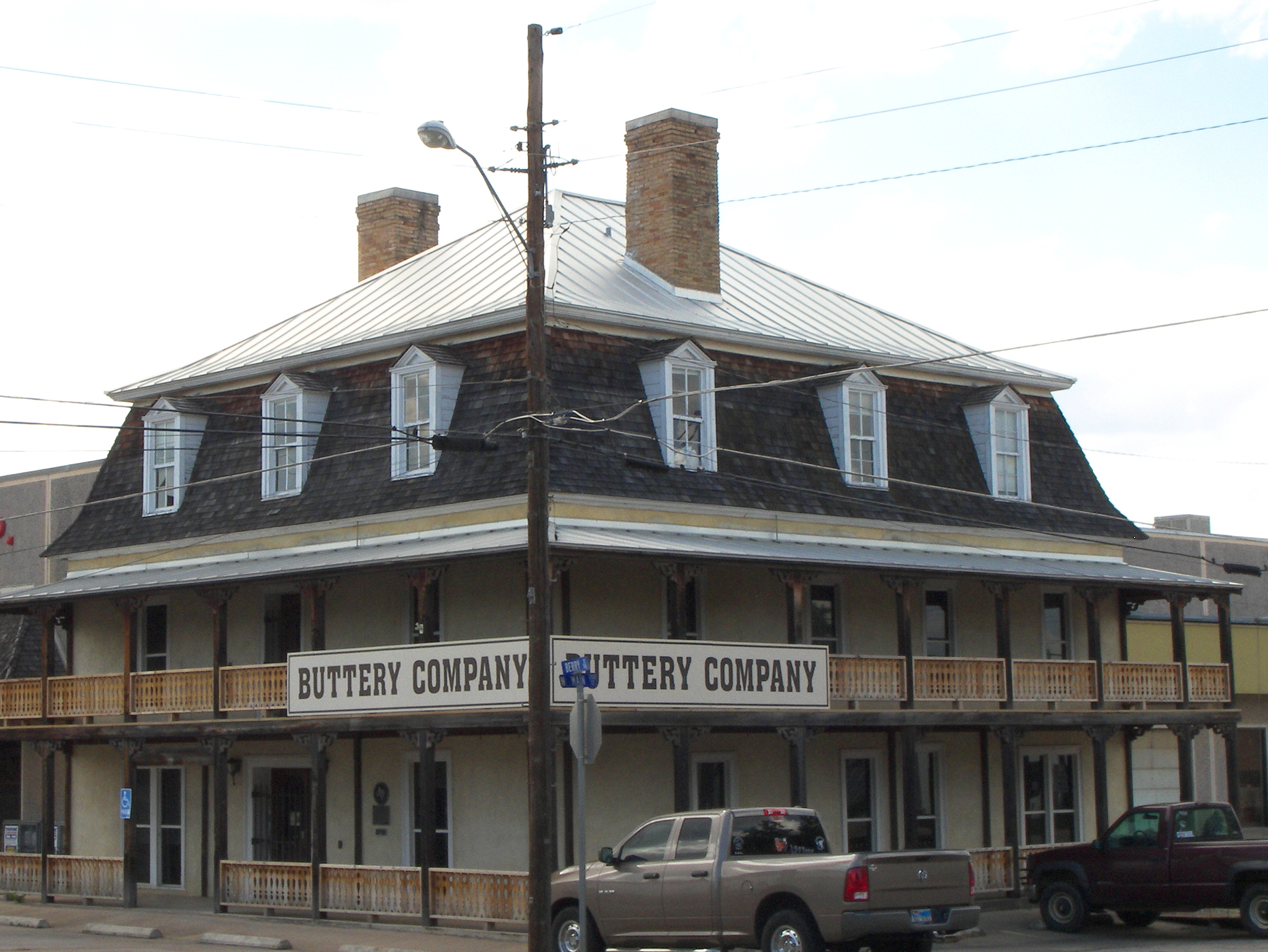
The former Southern Hotel in 2010

== Education ==
The City of Llano is served by the Llano Independent School District, which includes Packsaddle Elementary, Llano Elementary, Llano Junior High, and Llano High School. Llano's mascot is the Yellow Jacket and the school colors are orange and black. The Llano Independent School District serves about 1,900 students, and is currently a part of District 1-AAA, also including Blanco, Comfort, Ingram Moore, Brady and Florence.

== Recreation ==
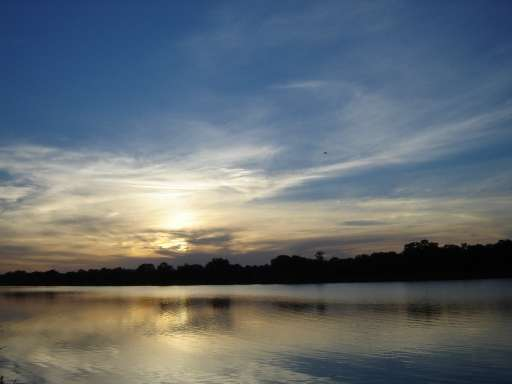
View from the shore of the Llano River

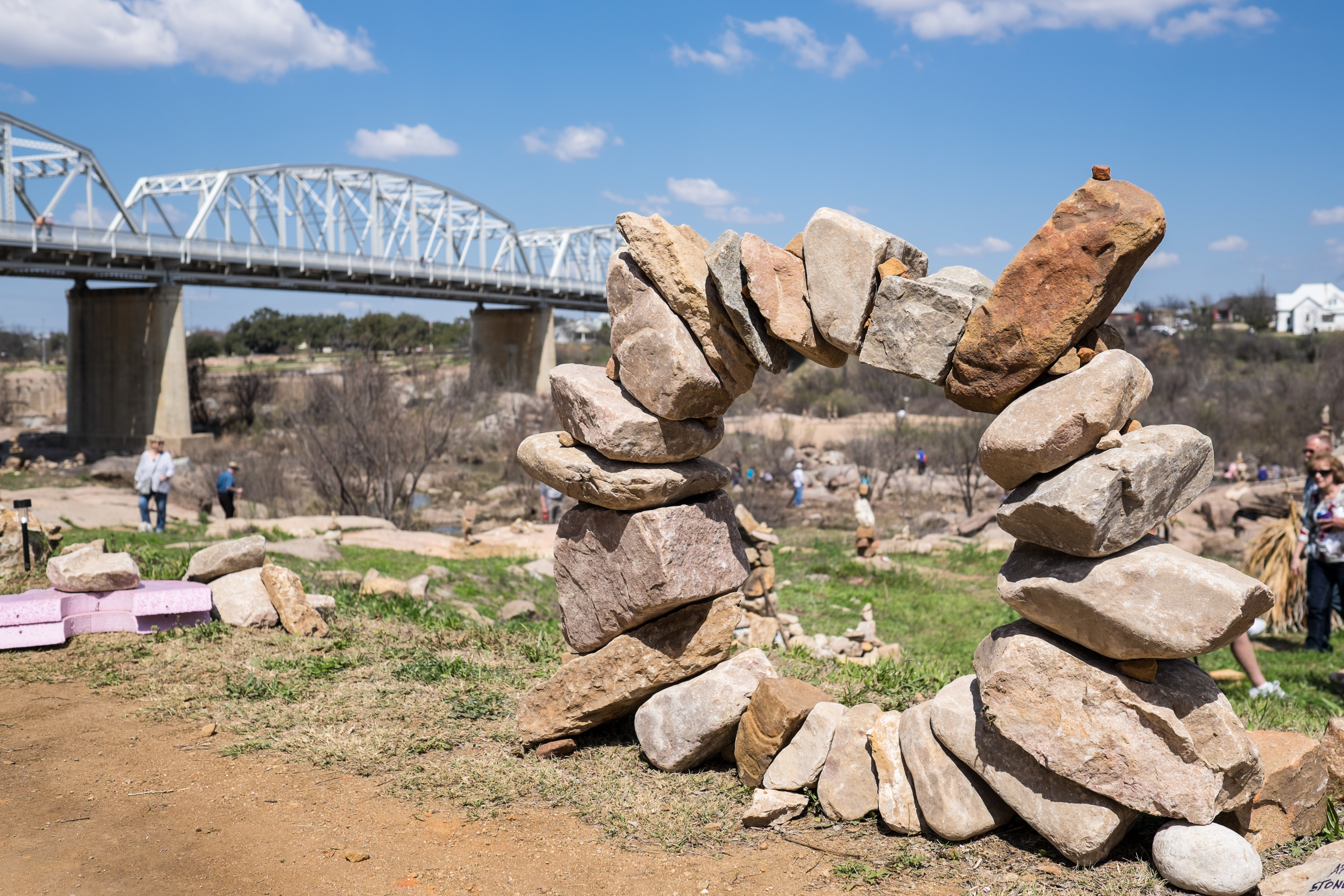
Rock Stacking Championship, 2014, at the Llano River. Bridge in photo was built in 1936, and was named a Texas Historic Bridge in 2006.

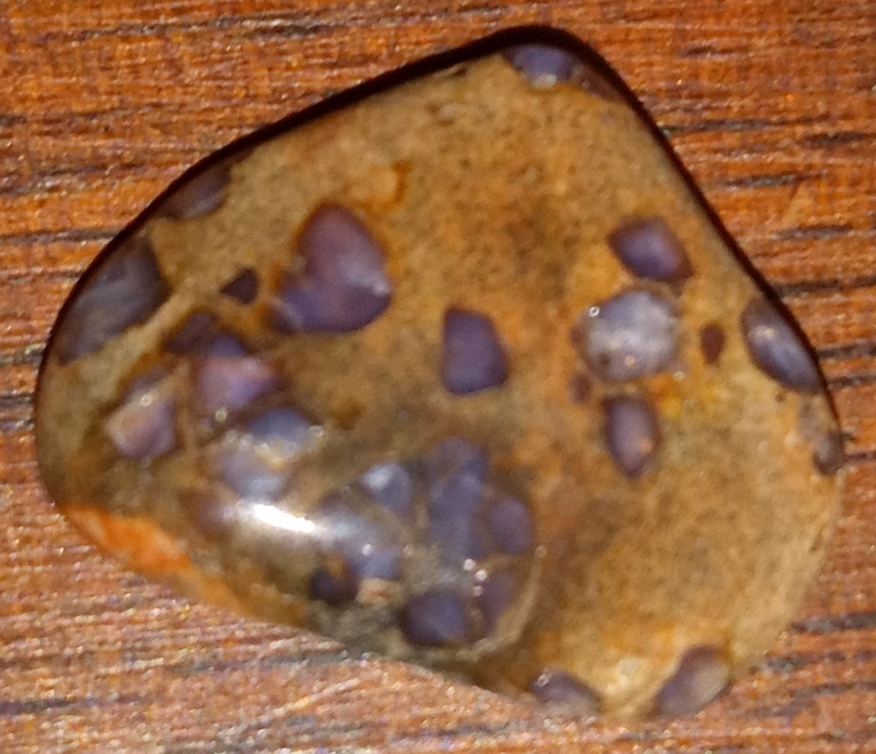
Llanite, with unusual blue quartz phenocrysts

=== Hunting ===
Llano is widely known as the Deer Capital of Texas, though its effort to be officially designated as such was rejected in 2016.

The density of white-tailed deer in the Llano Basin is the highest in the nation. Hunters from all over come to Llano for deer, quail, dove, feral pig, and turkey hunting, using guns or bows.

=== Birding ===
The bald eagle makes its home in Llano County during its annual winter migration with most birds found around the Lake Buchanan area.

=== Geology and archaeology ===
Llanite, a rare type of brown rhyolite porphyry with sky-blue quartz crystals and rusty-pink microcline feldspar, is found nowhere else in the world except in Llano County. Llanite can be found along a highway cut 9 mi (14 km) north of Llano on Texas 16. The largest piece of polished llanite in the world can be seen at the Badu House.

The centuries-long habitation of various Native American tribes in the area has produced numerous archaeological sites which attract amateur archaeologists year-round.

== Media ==
=== Newspaper ===
- The Llano News

=== Radio ===
- KVHL/91.7: Public radio
- KJFK-FM/96.3: adult hits
- KITY/102.9: Oldies

== Notable person ==
- W. C. Jameson — American singer/songwriter

== See also ==
- Central Texas Electric Cooperative
- Geology of Texas
- Llano Municipal Airport
