= Geology of Texas =

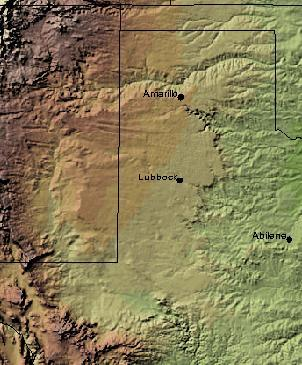
Shaded relief map of the Llano Estacado

Texas contains a wide variety of geologic settings. The state's stratigraphy has been largely influenced by marine transgressive-regressive cycles during the Phanerozoic, with a lesser but still significant contribution from late Cenozoic tectonic activity, as well as the remnants of a Paleozoic mountain range.

== General geology ==
Texas is approximately bisected by a series of faults that trend southwest to northeast across the state, from the area of Uvalde to Texarkana. South and east of these faults, the surface exposures consist mostly of Cenozoic sandstone and shale strata that grow progressively younger toward the coast, indicative of a regression that has continued from the late Mesozoic to the present. The coastal plain is underlaid by salt domes that are responsible for many of the oil traps in the region.

North and west of the faults are the Stockton, Edwards, and Comanche plateaux; these define a crustal block that was upthrown during the Neogene. This large region of central Texas, which extends from Brewster County east to Bexar, and northeast to the Red River features extensive Cretaceous shale and limestone outcrops. The limestone in particular is important, both economically for its use in cement manufacture and as a building material, as well as practically; a porous limestone formation in the Texas Hill Country is the reservoir of the Edwards Aquifer, a vital water source to millions.

Almost in the center of these Cretaceous rocks is the Llano Uplift, a geologic dome of Precambrian gneiss, schist, and granite, surrounded by Paleozoic sedimentary rocks. The granite here is quarried for construction, but it is perhaps best known to Texans through its manifestation as Enchanted Rock.

From San Saba north to Childress, and from Wichita Falls in the east to Big Spring in the west, the surface consists of late Paleozoic (Pennsylvanian) to early Mesozoic (Triassic) marine sediments. These strata grow younger from east to west, until they are overlain unconformably by terrigenous Ogallala sediments of Miocene and Pliocene age. These late Cenozoic deposits dominate the Texas Panhandle.

The geology of west Texas is arguably the state's most complex, with a mix of exposed Cretaceous and Pennsylvanian strata, overlain by Quaternary conglomerates. A series of faults trend southeast to northwest across the region, from Big Bend to El Paso; there are also extensive volcanic deposits. The Marathon Mountains northeast of Big Bend National Park have long been of special interest to geologists; they are the folded and eroded remains of an ancient mountain range, created in the same orogeny that formed the Ouachita and Appalachian Mountains.

== Historical geology ==
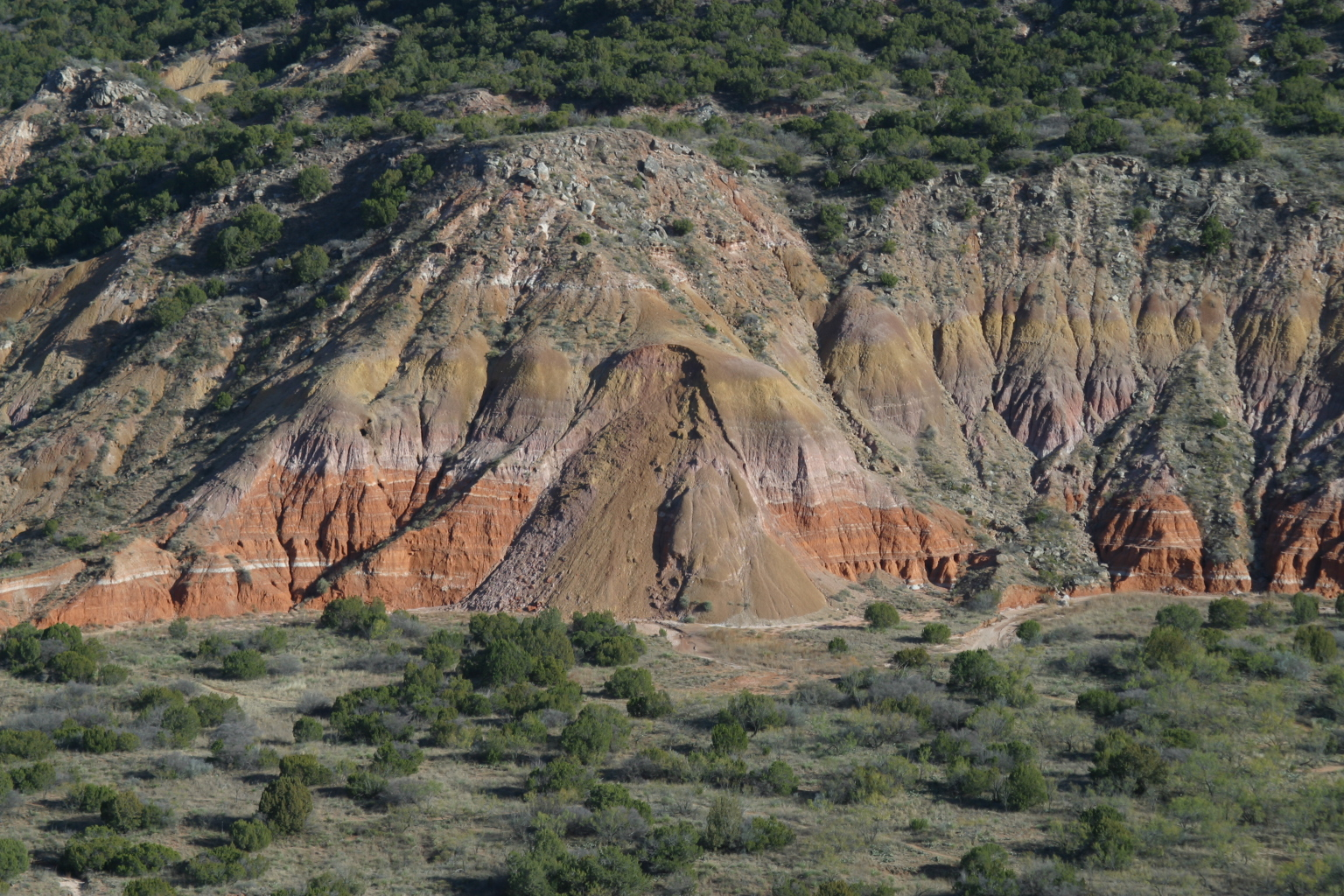
Landslide at Palo Duro Canyon (2002)

The Precambrian metamorphic and igneous rocks of the Llano Uplift probably formed during the Mesoproterozoic Grenville orogeny, which was part of the assembly of the supercontinent Rodinia. Over time, the mountains of the Grenville orogeny were eroded flat, and later covered by Paleozoic and Mesozoic sediments that were not uplifted and eroded in their present manner until the late Cenozoic.

Early to middle Paleozoic rocks in Texas are typically carbonate deposited in epeiric seas. Exceptions include a significant area of Cambrian sandstone in west Texas, and some shale strata from the Devonian and Mississippian periods. The Ouachita Mountains were uplifted across the state during the succeeding Pennsylvanian period; this provided a nearby source of sediment for shale and sandstone, along with more marine limestone deposition.

Permian rocks are the best-known of the Texas Paleozoic. They are widespread in north Texas, where their characteristic red beds are spectacularly exposed in Palo Duro Canyon. The strata are also oil-rich where buried in west Texas, such as in the Midland and Odessa region. This crude oil-rich area is known as the Permian Basin. Permian Texas was covered by shallow seas to the west, with evaporation flats to the east and north in the Panhandle. Outstanding exposures of Permian strata are located in and around Guadalupe Mountains National Park, the geology of which resulted in the definition of several Permian stratotypes; the region is one of the world's best for studies of the period.

Early and middle Mesozoic strata are, on the whole, poorly represented in Texas. Triassic rocks are limited to sandstone and shale in the Panhandle, while the Jurassic record is almost nonexistent at the surface. During the Late Triassic and Jurassic, the Gulf of Mexico was formed from a rift southeast of the Ouachita Mountains. Deeply buried salt deposits and marine limestones under the coastal plain also date from the Jurassic, when the first shallow seas formed.

The late Mesozoic record is much richer. Cretaceous rocks—particularly those of the Lower Cretaceous—are widespread at the surface, with yet more buried under the coastal plain. The strata consist of massive limestone sequences deposited when the entire region was submerged under the Western Interior Seaway, during the last great marine transgression.

The Western Interior Seaway had withdrawn by the beginning of the Cenozoic, the era that put the finishing touch on Texas's current geology. The modern coastal plain formed during this time; it comprises increasingly thick sediments (perhaps 15 km deep at the coastline) deposited southeastward into the downwarping Gulf of Mexico.

West Texas was rent by volcanism during the Eocene and Oligocene epochs, activity which formed most of the modern topography of the area. Later crustal extension created a series of alternating horsts and grabens similar to those in the Basin and Range Province of the western U.S. A late Cenozoic uplift of the Rocky Mountains led to the deposition of a vast fan of eroded sediment to their east, forming the Ogallala Formation that covers much of the Panhandle. Most of the state's current stream valleys and canyons date from the Pleistocene to the present, as the final geologic shaping of the state.

== Economic geology ==
Texas has been the leading state in petroleum production since discovery of the Spindletop oil field in January 10,1901 . As of October 2017, the State of Texas (if treated as its own nation) is the 7th largest oil producing nation in the world, with production totaling approximately 3.78 million barrels (600 thousand cubic meters) per day of oil equivalent. The environmental impacts of practices related to the state's shale gas production, including fracking and gas flaring, have generated controversy.

The state also produces nonfuel minerals such as uranium; much of its nonfuel mineral value is derived from production of cement, crushed stone, industrial sand, and construction sand and gravel. In the past, the state mined mercury, silver, and copper.

== See also ==
- Mount Blanco
- Mount Bonnell
- Llano Estacado
- Palo Duro Canyon
- Caprock Canyons
- Red Beds of Texas and Oklahoma
- Geology of Wichita Falls, Texas
- Geology of the United States
- Geology of North America
- Extreme point of Texas
- List of fossiliferous stratigraphic units in Texas
