= Fencepost limestone =

Stone bed in the Great Plains, North America

- Stratigraphic range: Turonian ~93.9–93.9 Ma
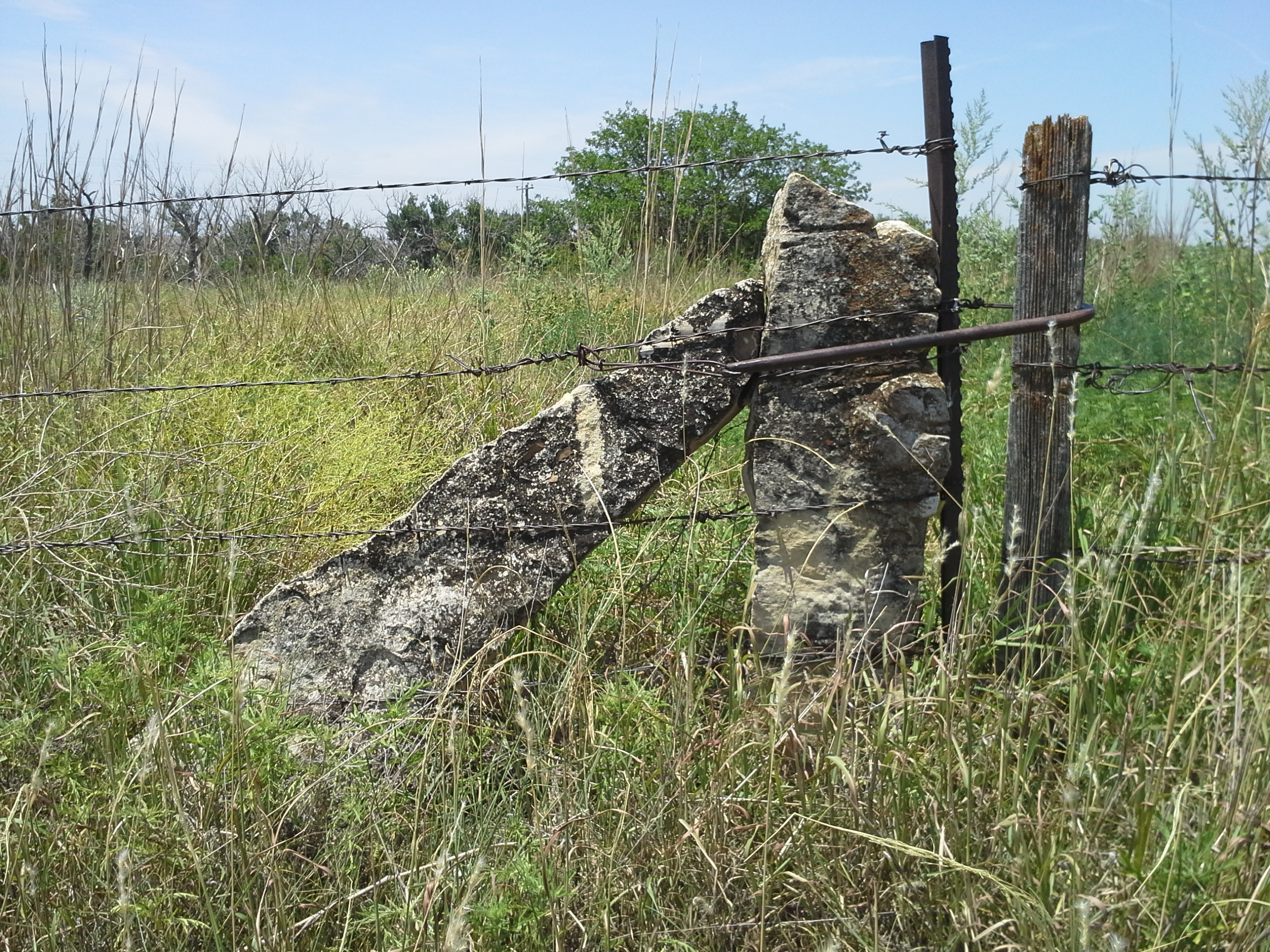
- Limestone endpost with leaner, an icon of Kansas
- Type: Geological marker bed
- Unit of: Greenhorn Formation
- Underlies: Carlile Formation
- Overlies: Uppermost beds of the Greenhorn Formation
- Thickness: 9–14 inches (0.23–0.36 m)

Lithology
- Primary: Chalky limestone (coccolithic)
- Other: Microsparry calcite matrix Inoceramus shells and fragments Yellow, orange, or brown stainings and nodules of Limonite

Location
- Country: United States
- Extent: Outcrops from the Nebraska border near Mahaska, Kansas, about 200 miles southwest to a few miles from Dodge City, Kansas. Recorded in well logs throughout the High Plains.

Type section
- Named for: Use as stone fenceposts
- Named by: F. W. Cragin
- Year defined: 1896

Fencepost limestone, Post Rock limestone, or Stone Post is a stone bed in the Great Plains, known for its historic use as fencing and construction material in north-central Kansas resulting in a unique cultural expression. The source of this stone is the topmost layer of the Greenhorn Limestone formation. It is a regional marker bed as well as a valued construction material of the late 19th and early 20th centuries in Kansas. This stone was very suitable for early construction in treeless settlements and it adds a notable rust orange tint to the region's many historic stone buildings. But the most famous use is seen in the countless miles of stone posts lining country roads and highways. This status gives rise to such regional appellations as Stone Post Country, Post Rock Scenic Byway, and The Post Rock Capital of Kansas. This rustic quality finds Fencepost limestone still used in Kansas landscaping today.

== Background ==
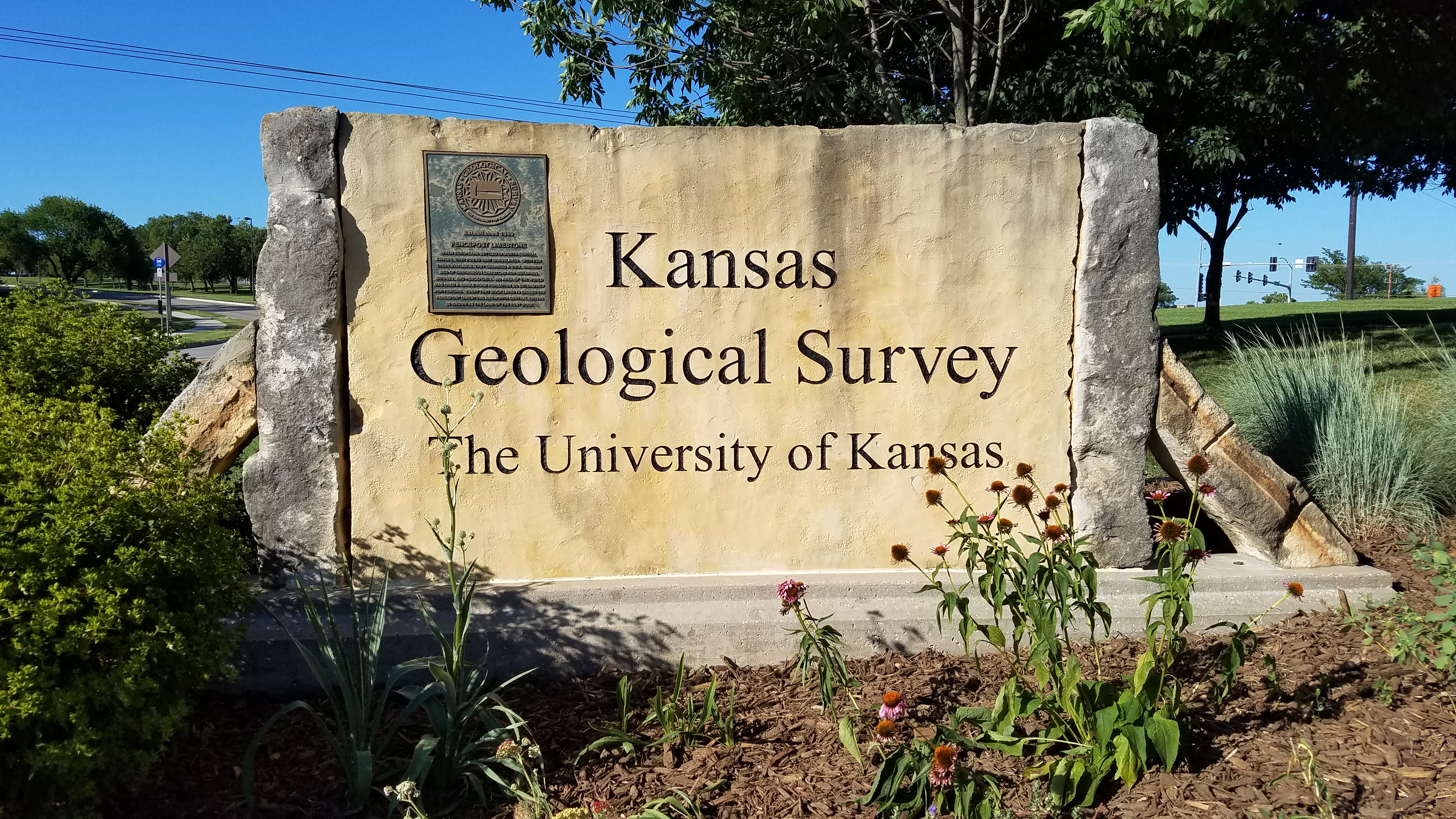
The sign for the Kansas Geological Survey is carved from a slab of Fencepost limestone as a monument to the stone's history.

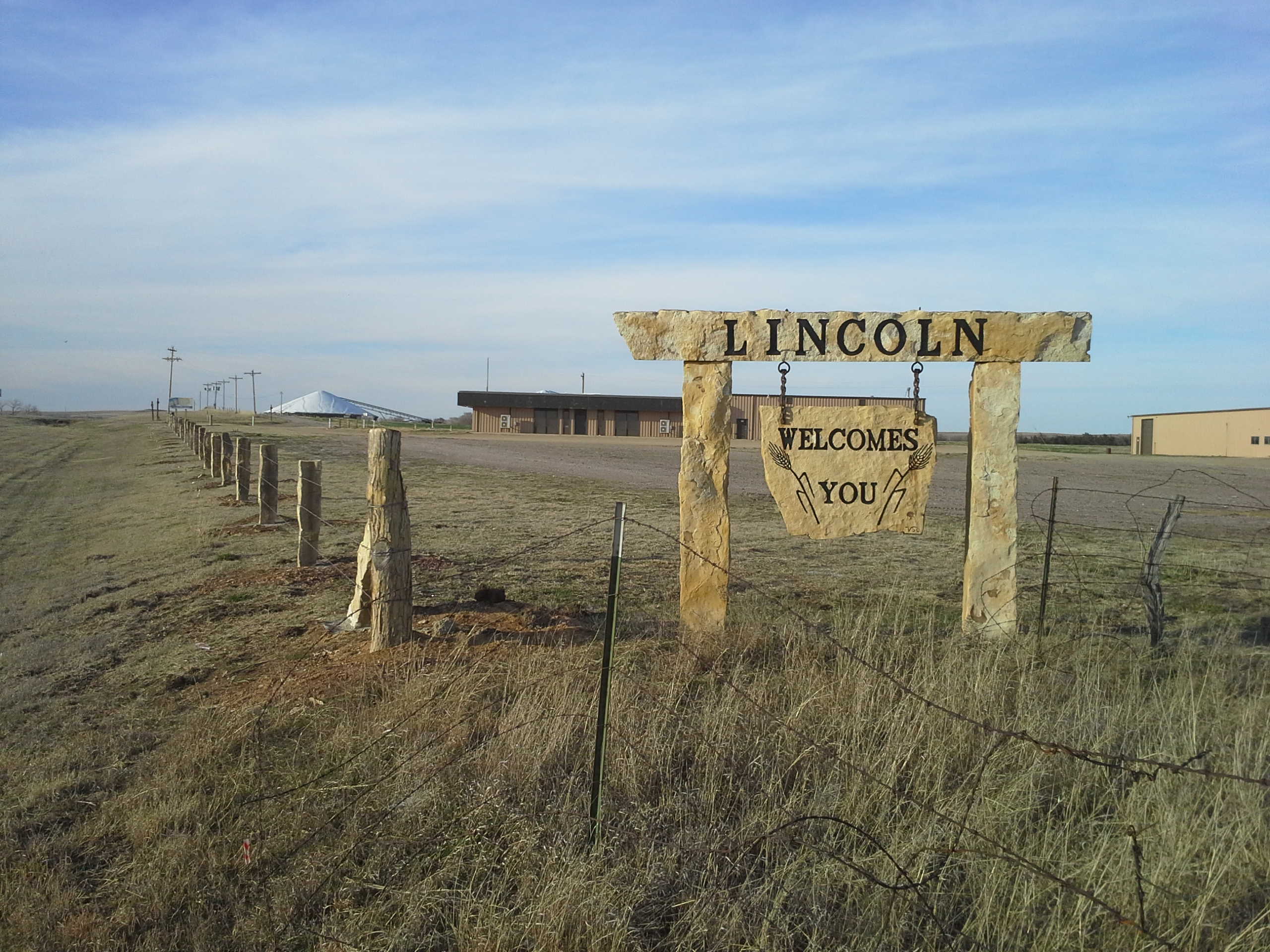
Such Stonepost signs welcome travelers to Post Rock Country communities.

The Fencepost limestone is a relatively thin, resistant, and recognizable bed of stone that forms the middle range of bluffs in the Smoky Hills region of north-central Kansas, ranging from the Nebraska border near Mahaska, Kansas, about 200 miles southwest to within a few miles of Dodge City, Kansas, where it is seen in the buildings of the farms and cities of the area.

The Fencepost limestone is unique for its contribution to the cultural landscape of Kansas, appearing as miles of stone fence posts lining austere fields and pastures. The drier climate coupled with the grazing habits of buffalo and the prairie burning practices of Plains Indians meant that the first European settlers to the region did not have enough local timber for construction and fencing. However, a suitable, easy to quarry stone was available. No other "area of the world has used a single rock formation so extensively for fencing."

The source of this limestone is the topmost bed of the Greenhorn Limestone. The Fencepost limestone is the ranging marker of the conformal contact between the Pfeifer Shale, which is the uppermost member Greenhorn Limestone below, and the Fairport Chalk, the lowest member of the Carlile Shale formation above.

This stone was first scientifically mentioned as the "Fencepost limestone" by F. W. Cragin in 1896 when he originally attempted to name it Downs limestone. The Fencepost bed has also been called Benton limestone for its prominence as a marker for the now generally obsolete Benton Group classification.

Reporting on the "Fence-Post Horizon" in 1897, W. N. Logan noted fifty thousand stone posts in Mitchell and Lincoln counties alone. Since then, the informal name "Fencepost limestone bed" has come to have a stature equal that of the adjacent members. The greatest use of the Fencepost limestone, for fencing and building, was from 1884 to 1920.

Effective July 1, 2018, Kansas Legislation HB 2650 designated Greenhorn Limestone formation, specifically "the famous "post rock" limestone" bed of that unit, to be the state rock of Kansas.

== Uses ==
=== Fencing ===
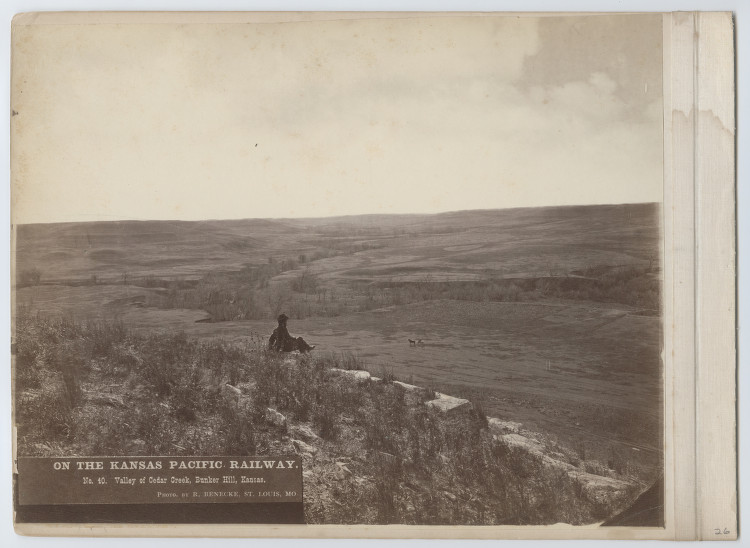
Photographer Robert Benecke seated upon an outcrop of the Fencepost limestone. (1873)

When Europeans settled in north-central Kansas, they found vast grasslands. With few trees available, they quarried a thin, shallow bed of Cretaceous limestone for buildings, bridges, and fenceposts. No area of the world has used a single rock formation so extensively for fencing. Today that rock layer is called Fencepost limestone and north-central Kansas is known as the Land of the Post Rock.

— Commemorative plaque on the carved Fencepost limestone sign for the Kansas Geological Survey, Lawrence, Kansas

On the early open ranges of the Kansas frontier, typically, the burden was on the farmers to protect their crops from free-range and driven cattle.

Common practice of earlier frontier farmers in the East and the in Old Northwest Territory was to use the timber cleared from the new fields for split-rail fencing. But, at the time of American settlement, Kansas was largely treeless. Owing to the intensive grazing of millions of buffalo, as well as to the particular land management of the 19th century Plains Indians, the small amount of timber that was available was confined to river banks.

In eastern Kansas, abundant, large, flinty stones could be collected from the hills and fields to build long stone walls. However, in several counties in central Kansas, where most of the rock was soft shale or chalk, a practical alternative was available; one particular bed of stone had ideal properties to substitute for wood fenceposts. Forming the posts required some labor and the posts are heavy – 250–450 pounds (110–200 kg) – but, with the recent invention of barbed wire, only one post was needed every 30 feet (9.1 m) or so.

The relative ease of forming durable stone posts from Fencepost limestone is not to be neglected in the context of a treeless frontier farming economy. The bed is not deeply buried, requiring relatively little effort to uncover. Fresh exposed slabs are soft and easy to work; the stone hardens only after removal from the shale and drying out in the open air. Curiously, the natural bed is not jointed; so several long rows of complete posts or large slabs can be split off of a large exposed sheet of limestone without breaking. No heavy equipment is required, and community blacksmiths could easily make serviceable tool sets.

Lines of the oldest stone posts have stood in place for well over a hundred years. But in the 1920s, rural labor costs had increased to the point that stone posts could no longer be made and installed as cheaply as mass-produced steel and treated wood post. As stone post fences are removed or are replaced with steel or wood post fences, the stone posts are usually collected for reuse, often in landscaping, but, because of their greater weight and strength, they are also used as corner posts in new fences.

Currently, the Permian top-ledge Cottonwood Limestone is commercially split and shaped to superficially resemble the Kansas Stone Posts. Examples are seen in the Kansas Veterans' Cemetery at Wakeeny. These "faux" post rocks (such as seen on the left in the cited image) can be detected by their all-white color, presence of fusulinids, larger drill size, absence of iron staining, and absence of Cretaceous mollusks.

Post Rock fences of Kansas
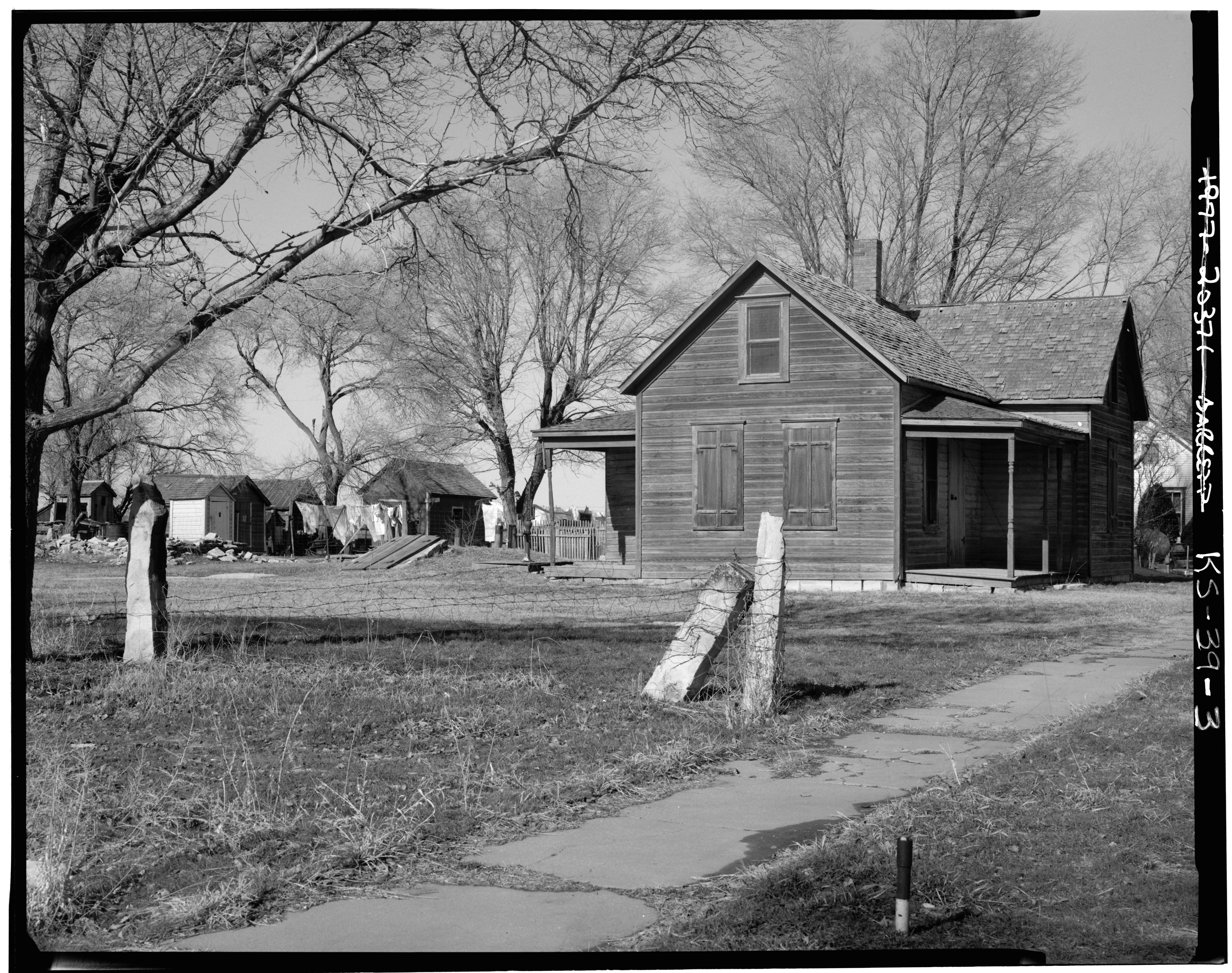
Stone posts with "sheep fencing", Munjor

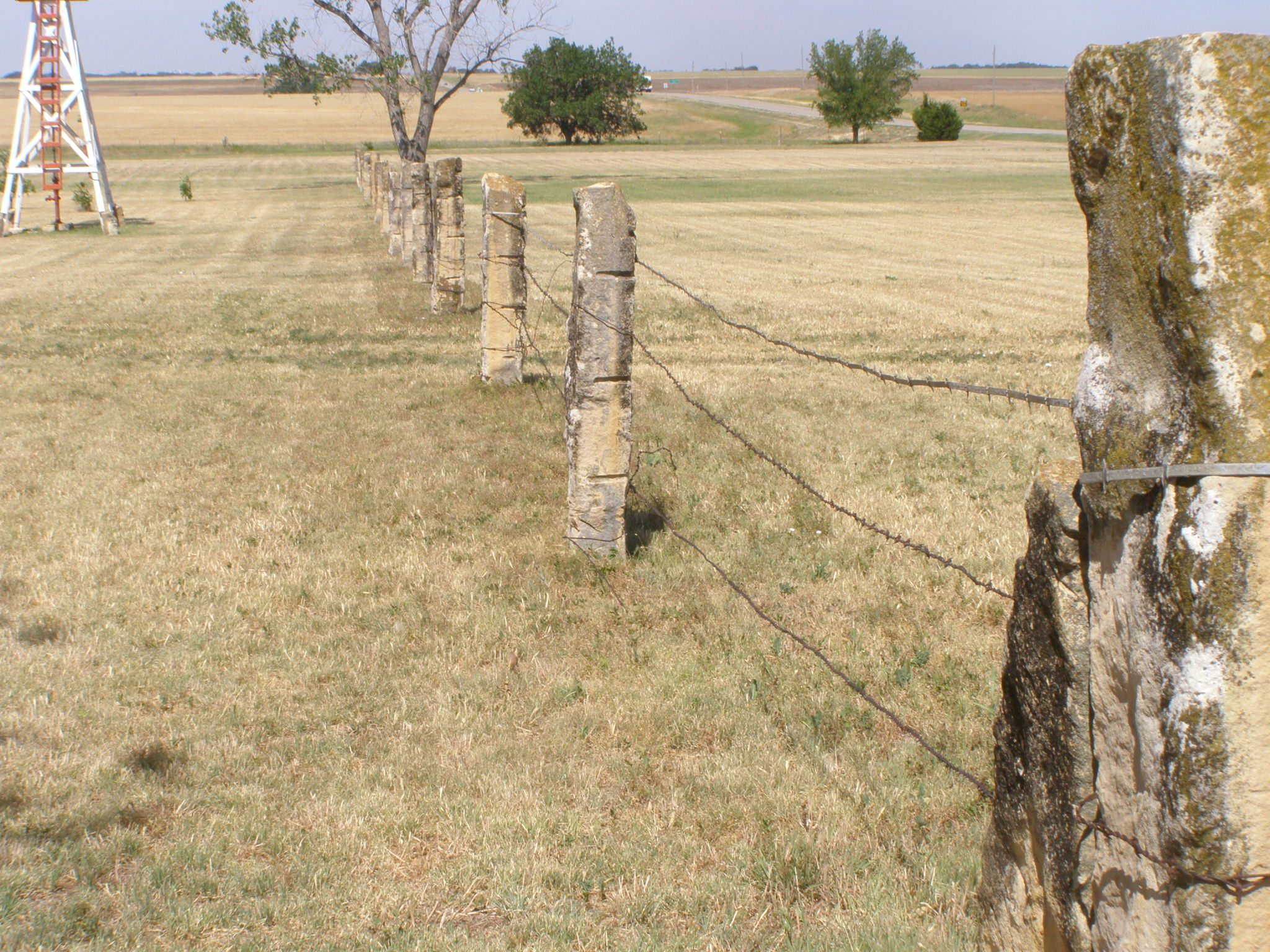
Recreated stone post fence at the Santa Fe Trail Center

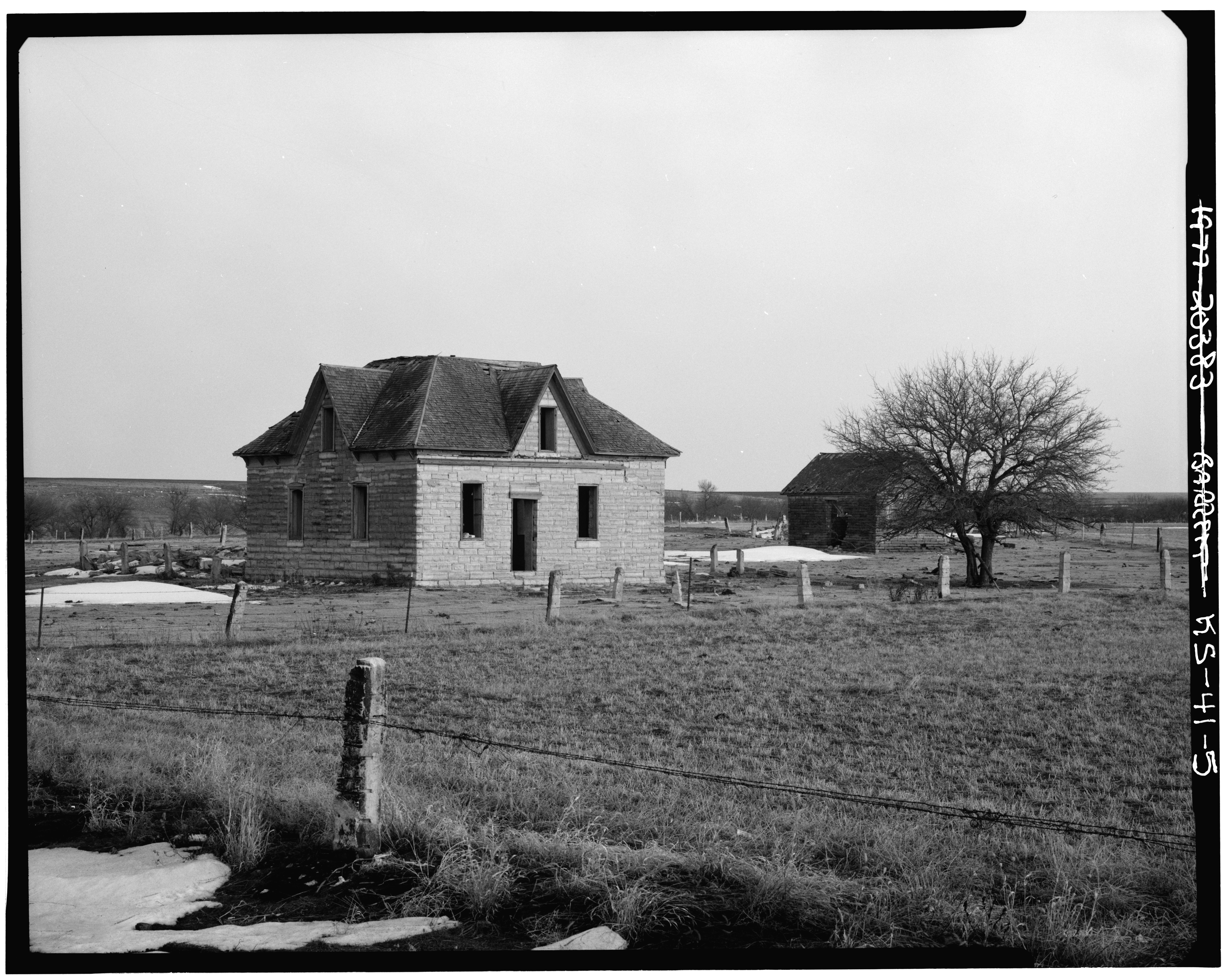
Post rock fencing near Liebenthal.

=== Quarrying ===
Kansas' stone fenceposts were manufactured from bluffs that had been cut by regional rivers through the Blue Hills. On these hills, the unweathered limestone bed can be exposed by removing shallow overburden. Quarrying leaves a long trench from 10 to 20 feet (3.0 to 6.1 m) in width in which water can collect after a rain.

Traditionally, these posts were manufactured in-place by drilling lines of holes directly into the freshly exposed, soft limestone bed (only about halfway through). Then feathers and wedges were set into the holes and the wedges hammered to split the posts off. The posts were generally used with the rough quarry face finish; so the drilled holes usually remain visible. After farmers began making these Stone Posts, building blocks for construction were quarried from the bed in the same way, so the drill holes the quarry faces are often visible in buildings unless removed by hammered or pitched face finishing.

Traditional hole splitting can still be used in Fencepost limestone quarries remaining today, especially if the rustic finish is desired; however, saw cutting of the limestone in-place is also done, depending on the product finish desired.

Quarrying Stone Posts from the Fencepost Limestone
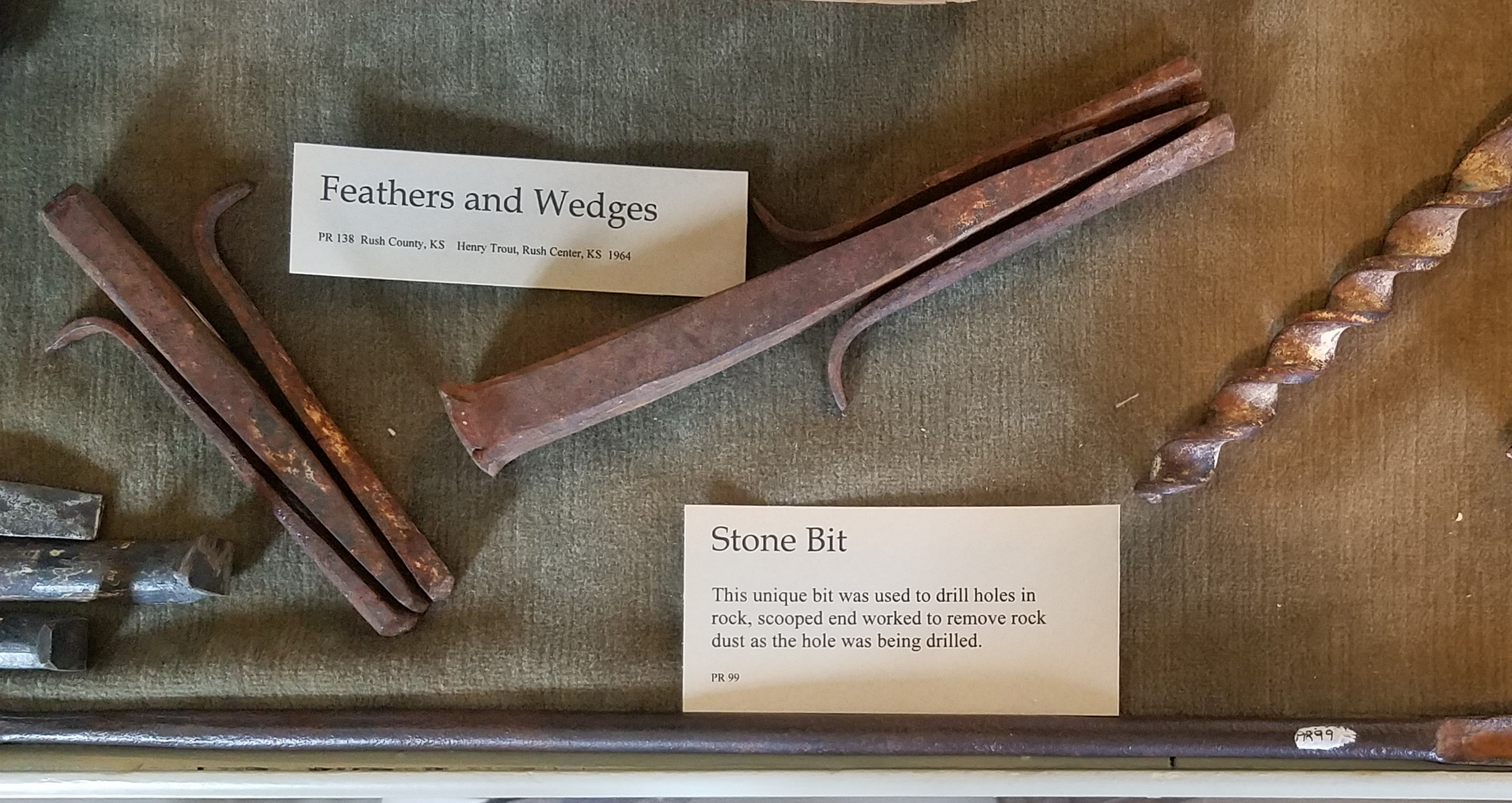
Feathers and wedges used in splitting the limestone

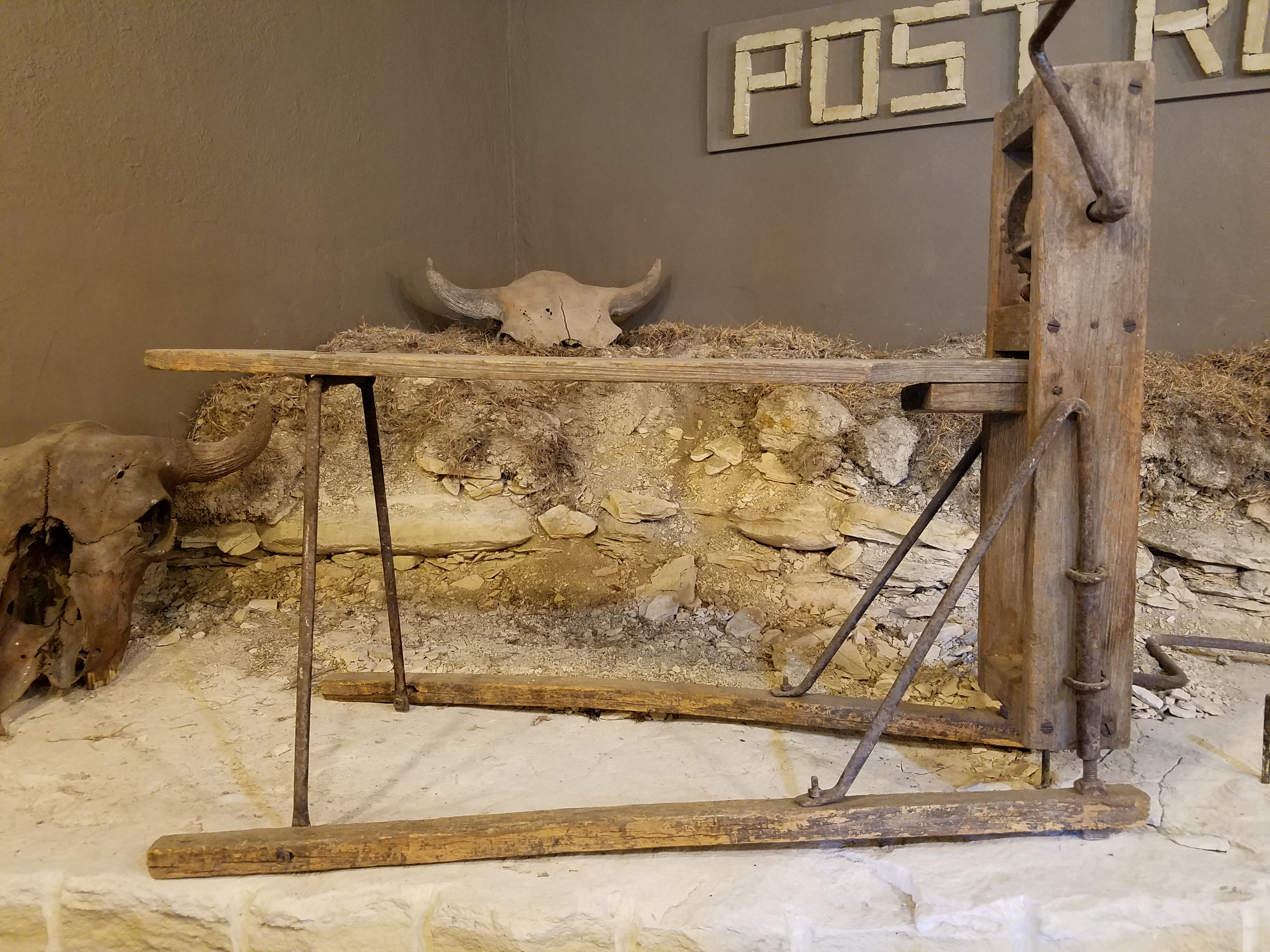
The mason's weight on the bench applies pressure on the drill

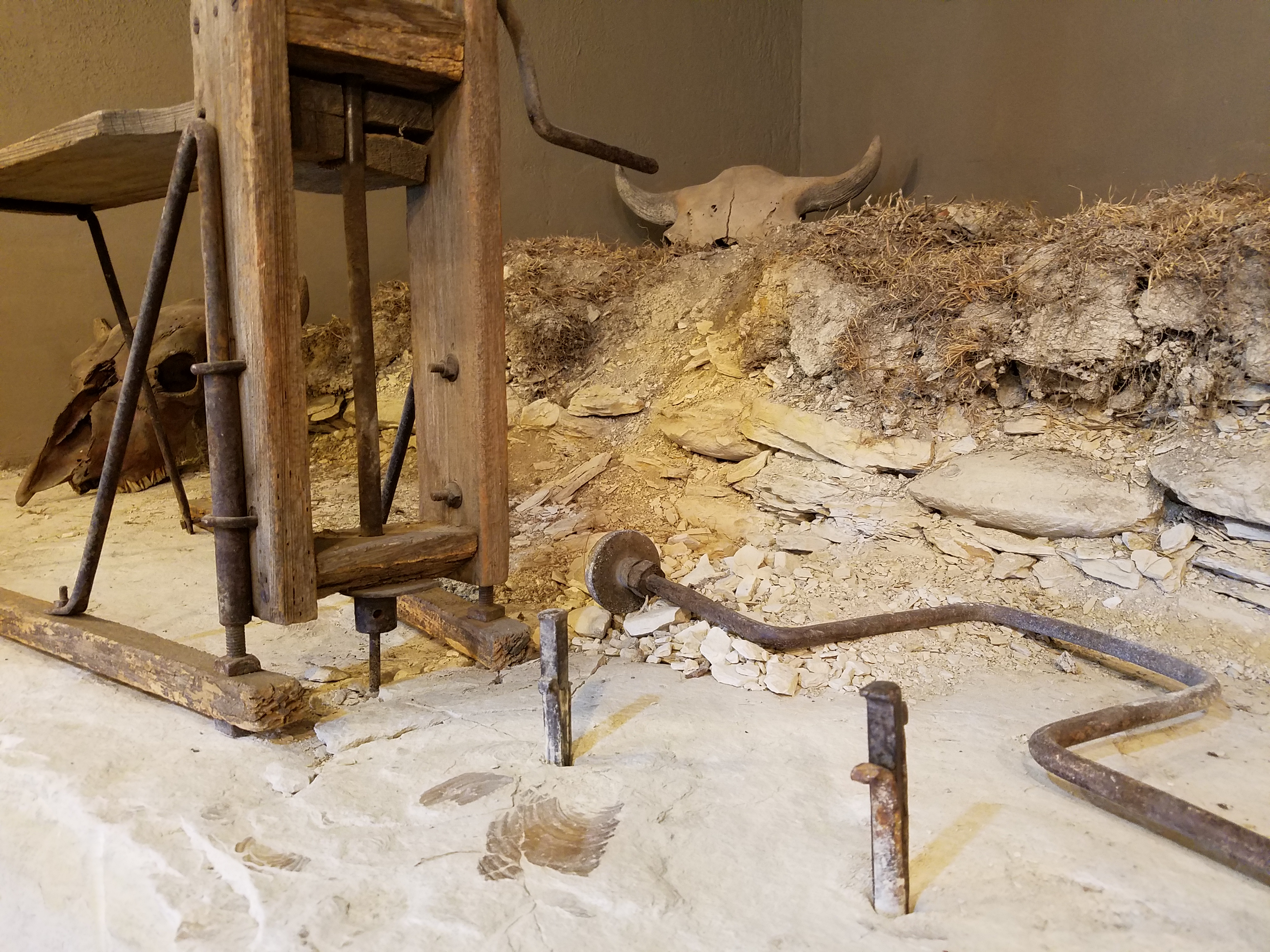
Setting feathers and wedges in the holes

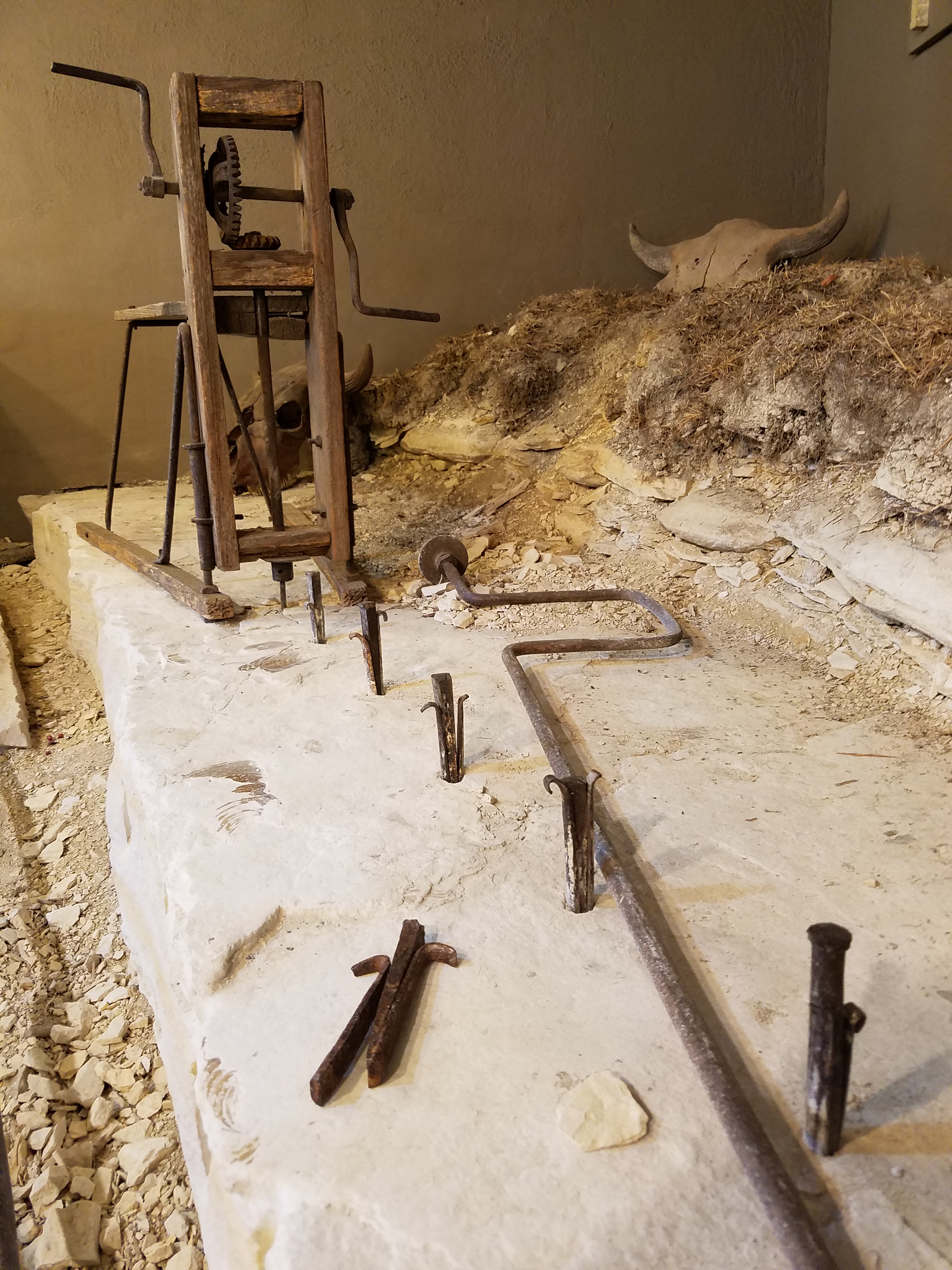
Line of feathers and wedges ready to split a post off

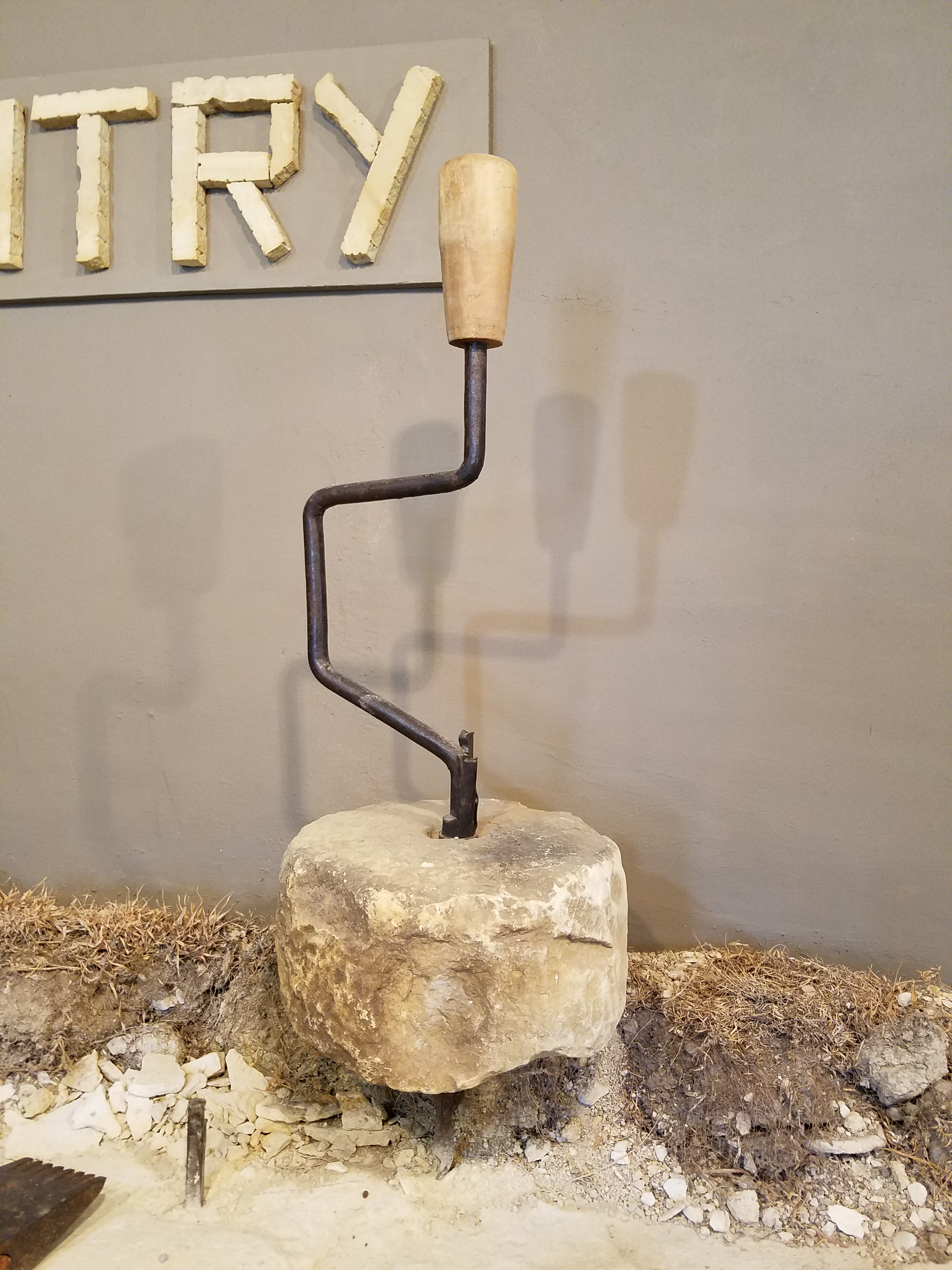
A simple brace and bit with a stone flywheel and weight to ease drilling

=== Construction stone ===
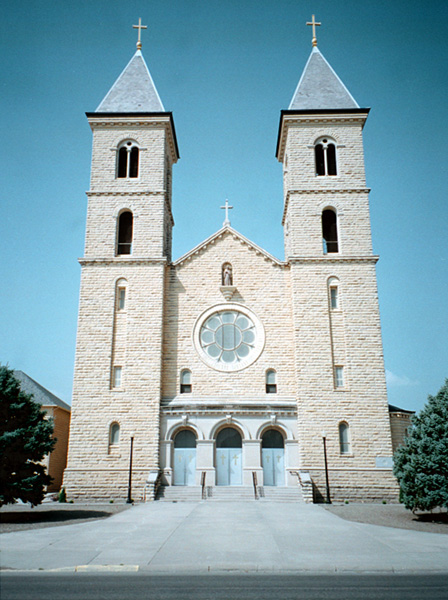
Basilica of St. Fidelis, Victoria (known informally as the "Cathedral of the Plains"). Parishioner farmers hauled 17 million pounds (7.7 million kg) of Fencepost limestone in horse-drawn wagons to build it.

A regional construction material, Fencepost limestone appears yellowish to buff with orange to brown tinted streaking, sometimes weathering to nearly white in color when openly exposed for many decades. Use of this particular limestone bed of for construction slightly preceded the realization that it could be used for fenceposts. First homes for settler farmers on the treeless prairie were typically dugouts and sod houses. Commercial dimensional lumber was an expense ill-afforded by settler farmers, even more so where it had to be shipped in from out-of-state. The Greenhorn Formation has many limestone beds, but most are too thin, too soft, or too fragile to be used in permanent buildings. The Fencepost bed, however, has convenient thickness and is easily worked into tough, durable, and decorative building blocks. Its resistance to erosion compared to the overlying Carlile Shale results in it forming broad bluffs or plateaus; so, it is abundant and relatively easy to quarry. In an age of kerosene lamps and coal stoves, it was a fireproof alternative to scarce timber.

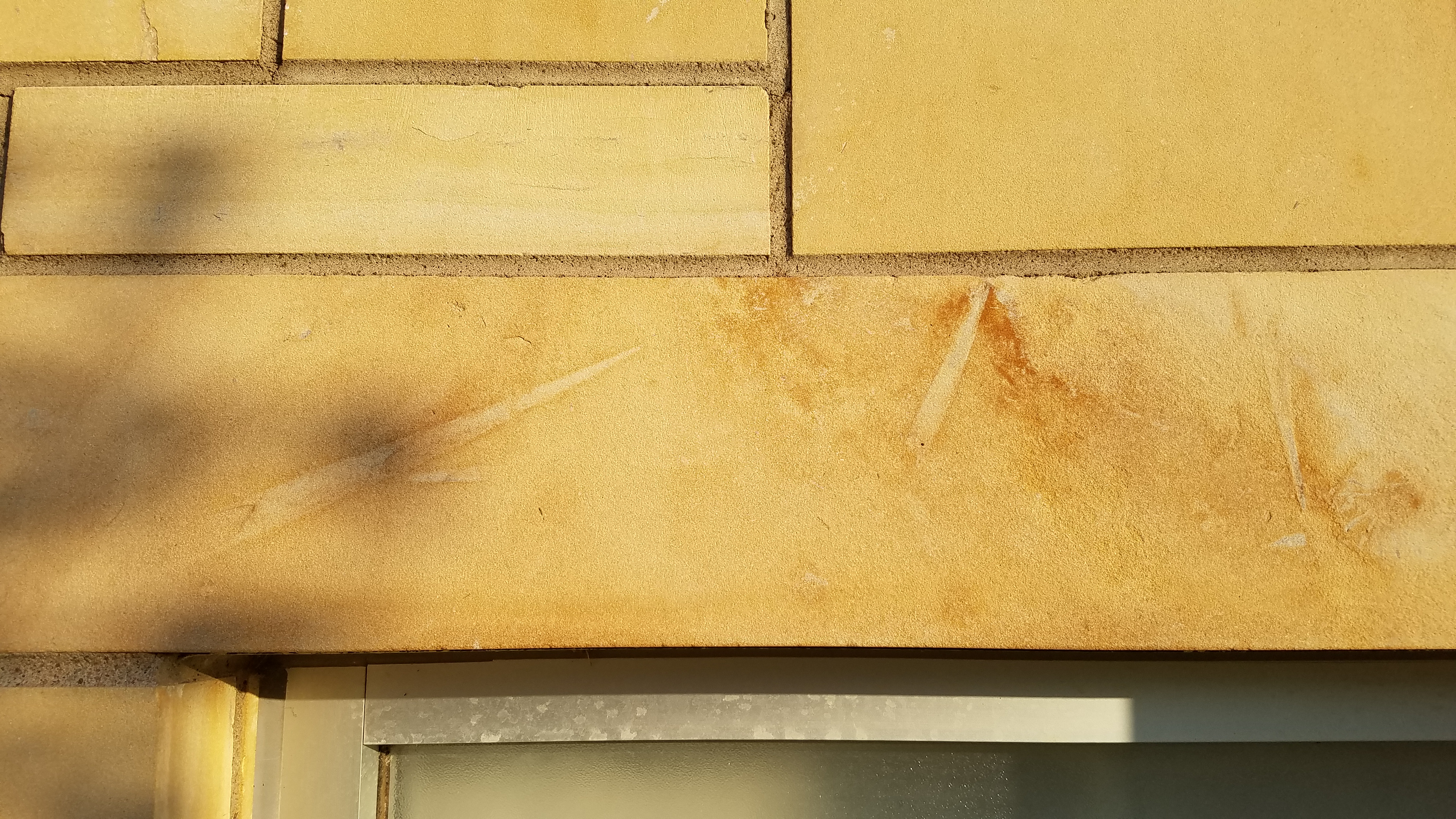
Shiner-laid Fencepost limestone displaying Baculites yokoyamai and other fossils on the exterior of the First United Methodist Church of Hays.

It was normal to lay the Fencepost limestone with its bedding plane horizontal; so, fossils can only be seen in thin cross section in the walls of almost all buildings built with Fencepost limestone. However, when laid in this stretcher fashion, the characteristic red-orange or brown lines are displayed. Many buildings have the limestone left with quarry face, many showing the holes drilled for splitting. Some buildings may have hammered finish, others pitched. The Ellis County courthouse is a large example of sawed, stretcher course Fencepost limestone. It is uncommon to see this stone set in walls in vertical "shiner" orientation, but such an orientation can show off the fossil content. An example of this is the First United Methodist Church of Hays built in 1949; here the Fencepost limestone was cut into slabs and set vertically; and its index fossil, Collignoniceras woollgari, is displayed in well-preserved cross sections in a few places.

Use of Post Rock in buildings declined in the 1920s as concrete came into greater use. Resurgence occurred in the use of the stone in public buildings in the 1930s as these were built as WPA projects. Use of the Fencepost limestone continued to later times through very few examples, more likely to use sawn and shiner-laid stone than the historic buildings. Later examples include the Guaranty State Bank, Beloit, 1958, and the Gross Field House and Coliseum, FHSU, 1960s and 1975.

Fencepost Limestone Constructions of Kansas
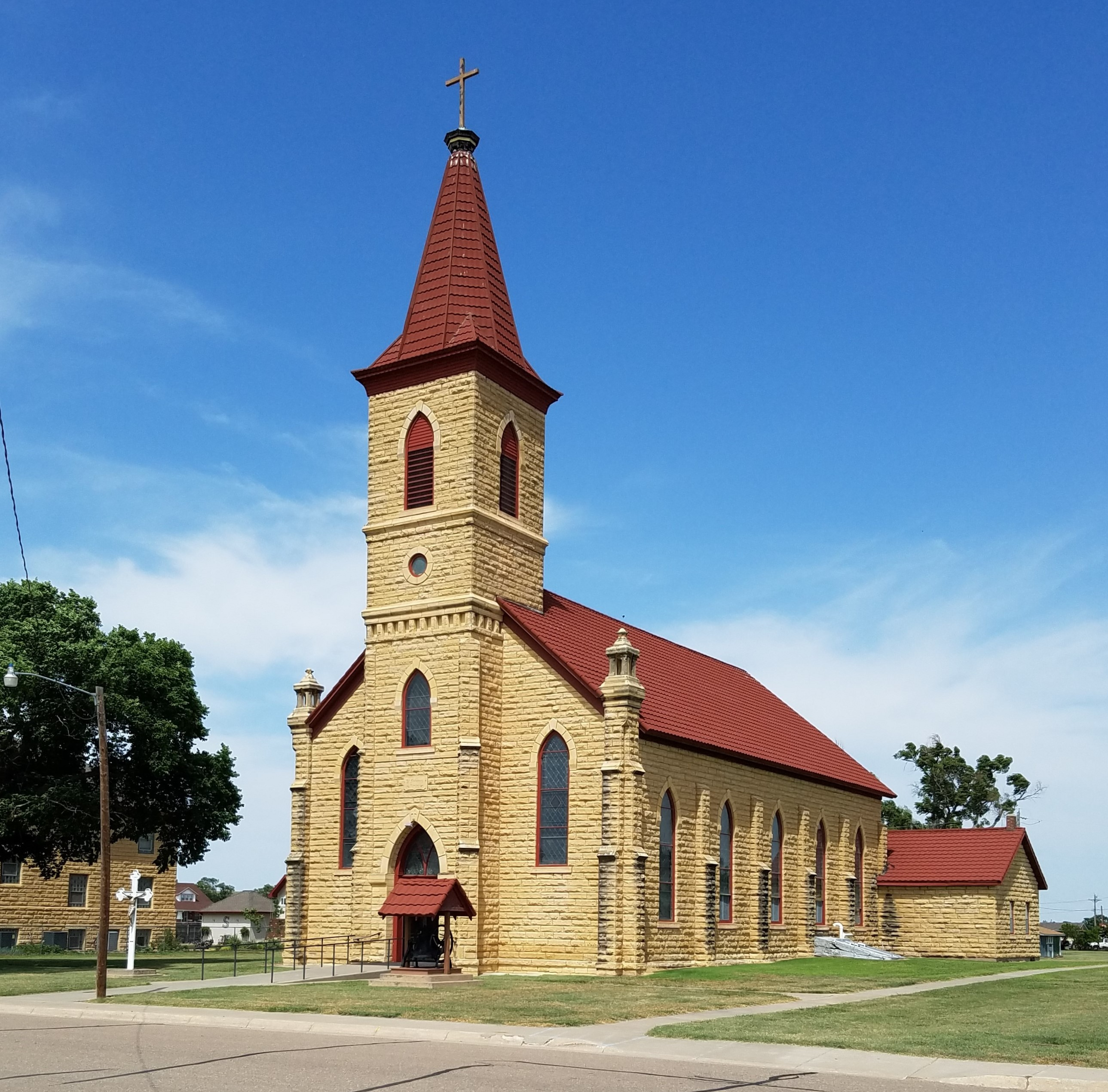
St. Anthony Church
Schoenchen

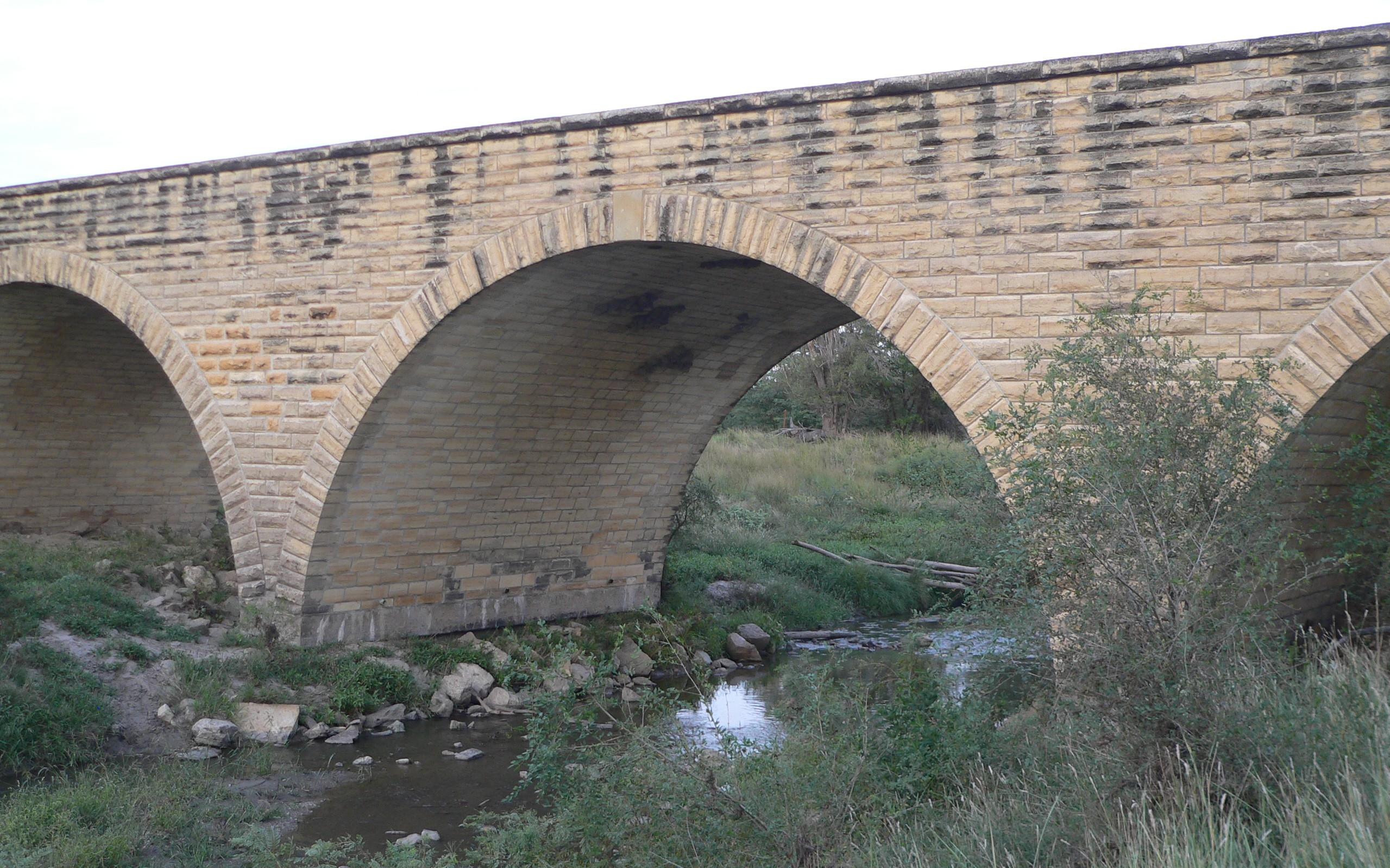
Fort Fletcher Stone Arch Bridge, 1938
Ellis County

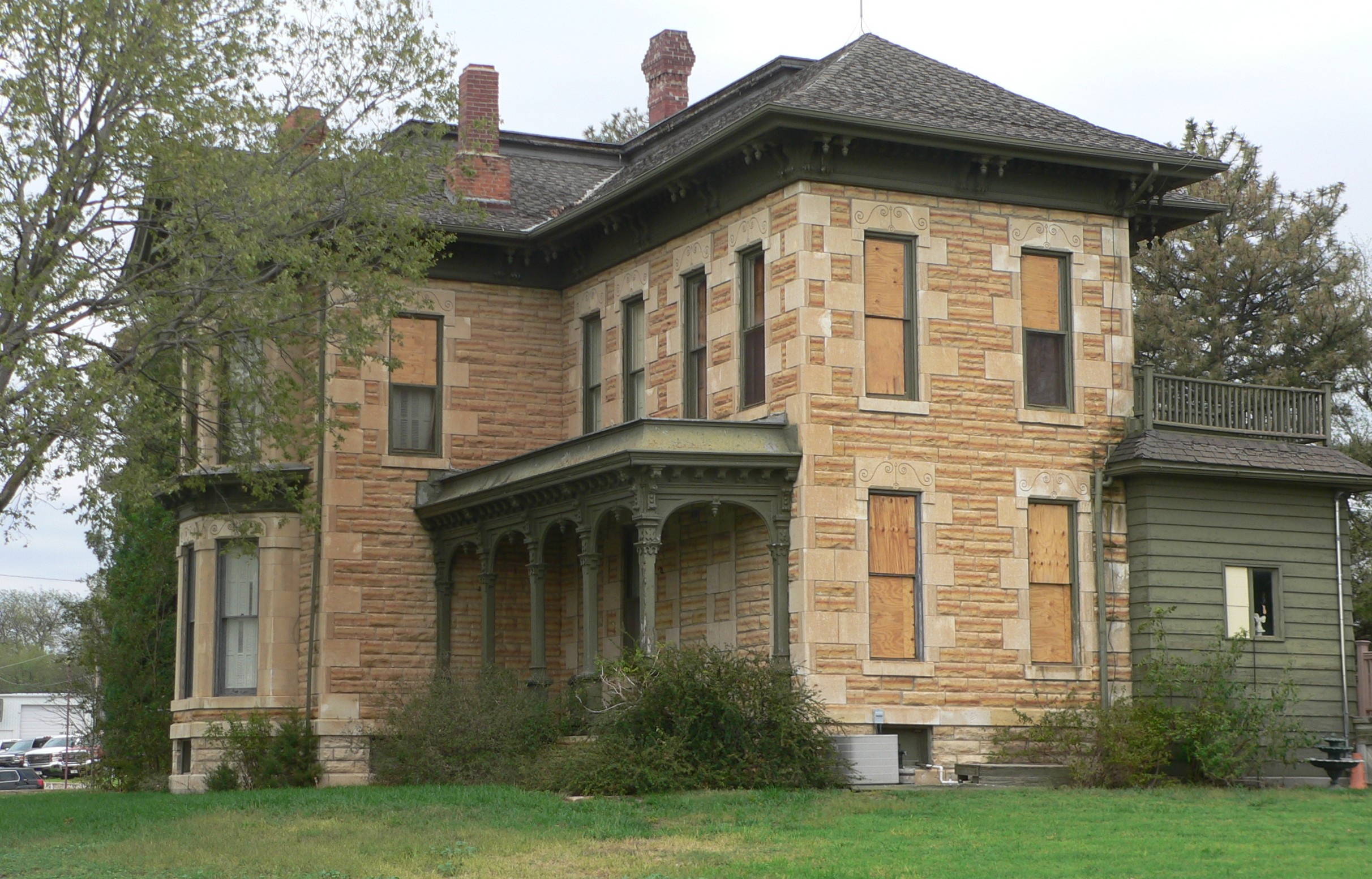
Hart House, Beloit

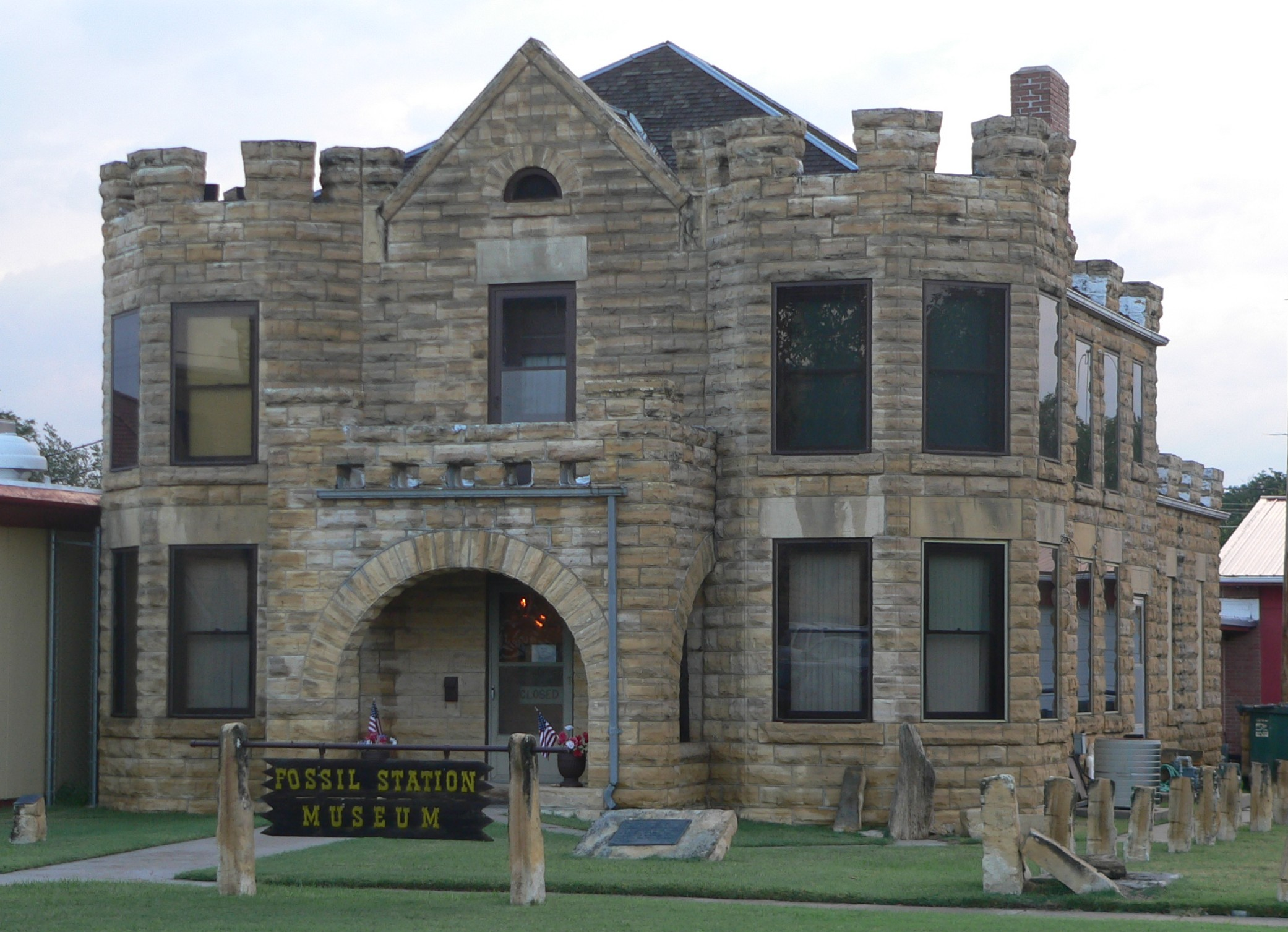
Fossil Station Museum,
Russell

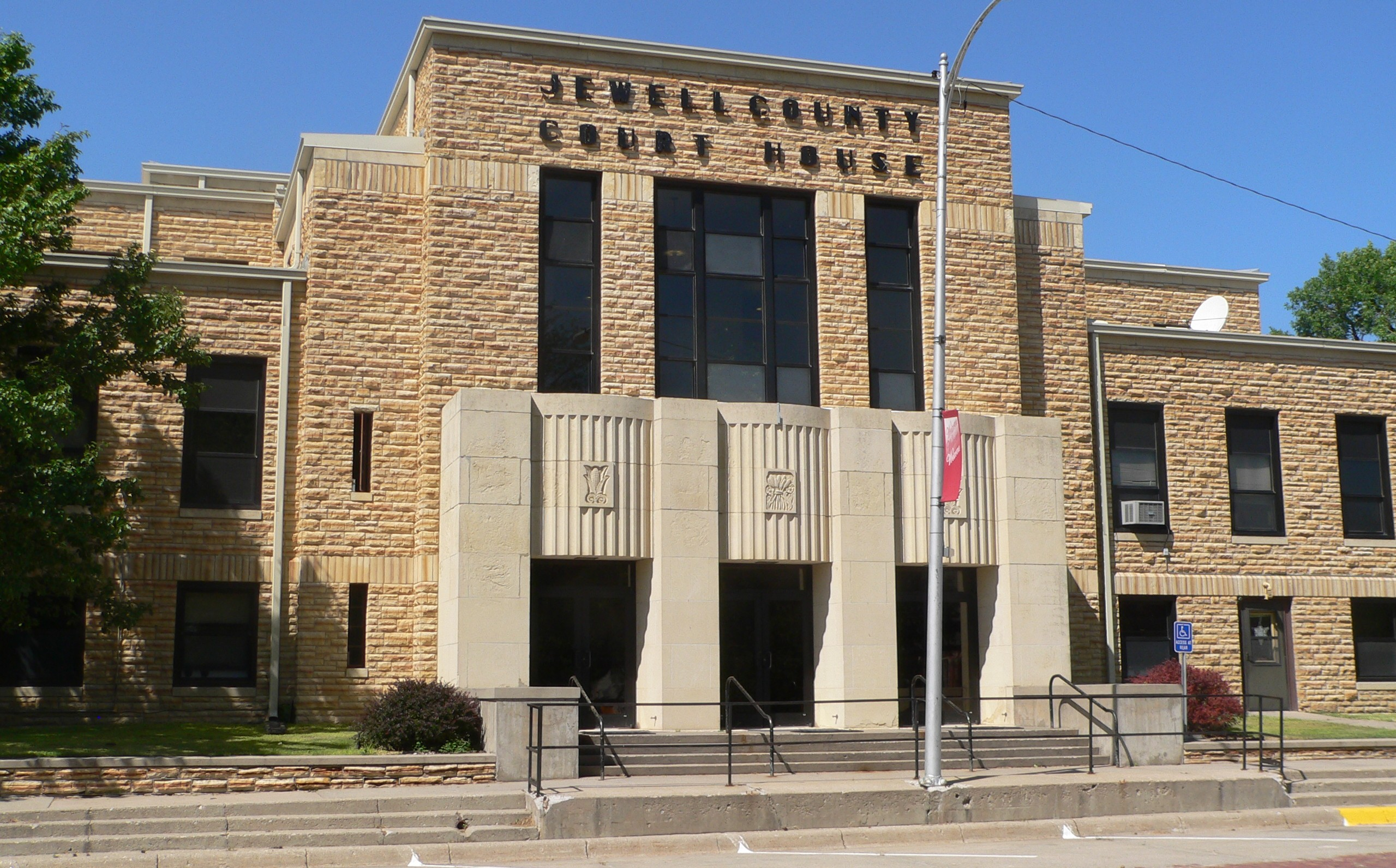
Jewell County courthouse
Mankato

=== Landscaping ===
Nostalgia for the stone post fencing, as well as the unique coloration and rustic quarry facing of the stone, finds the posts and the source limestone used in modern landscaping in locations as far away from the outcrop as people are willing to haul it. Commonly, original posts removed from demolished or replaced stone post fences are repurposed. Also, blocks of Fencepost limestone are recovered from collapsed or demolished buildings. Fresh stone is also quarried for landscaping and novelty products.

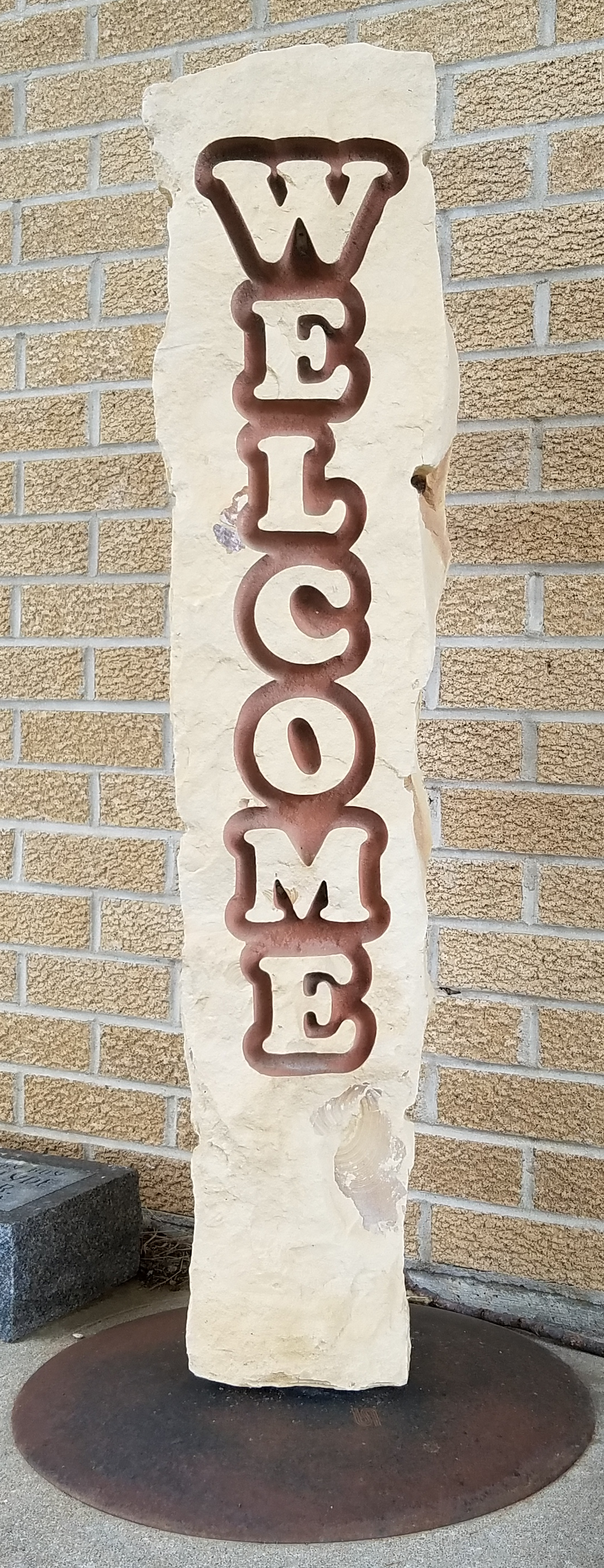
- Commonly, a single post, possibly with a leaner, is set in a home's yard, and may have street numbers, family names, or other names carved into the stone, or may have a mailbox set on the post.
- A line of stone posts may be set to evoke the rustic fences of the prairie. Split rails are occasionally set on the posts to complete a border.
- Posts or blocks may be set as lawn and garden edging, and can be selected for display of the clam shells.
- Posts or blocks may be assembled into ornamental retaining walls
- The natural thickness of the stone is practical for rustic stone stair steps.
- Individual posts or pieces may be carved for display of family, school, or sports team names.
- Slabs may be planed to a smooth face and a sign carved into it.

Fencepost Limestone in Landscaping
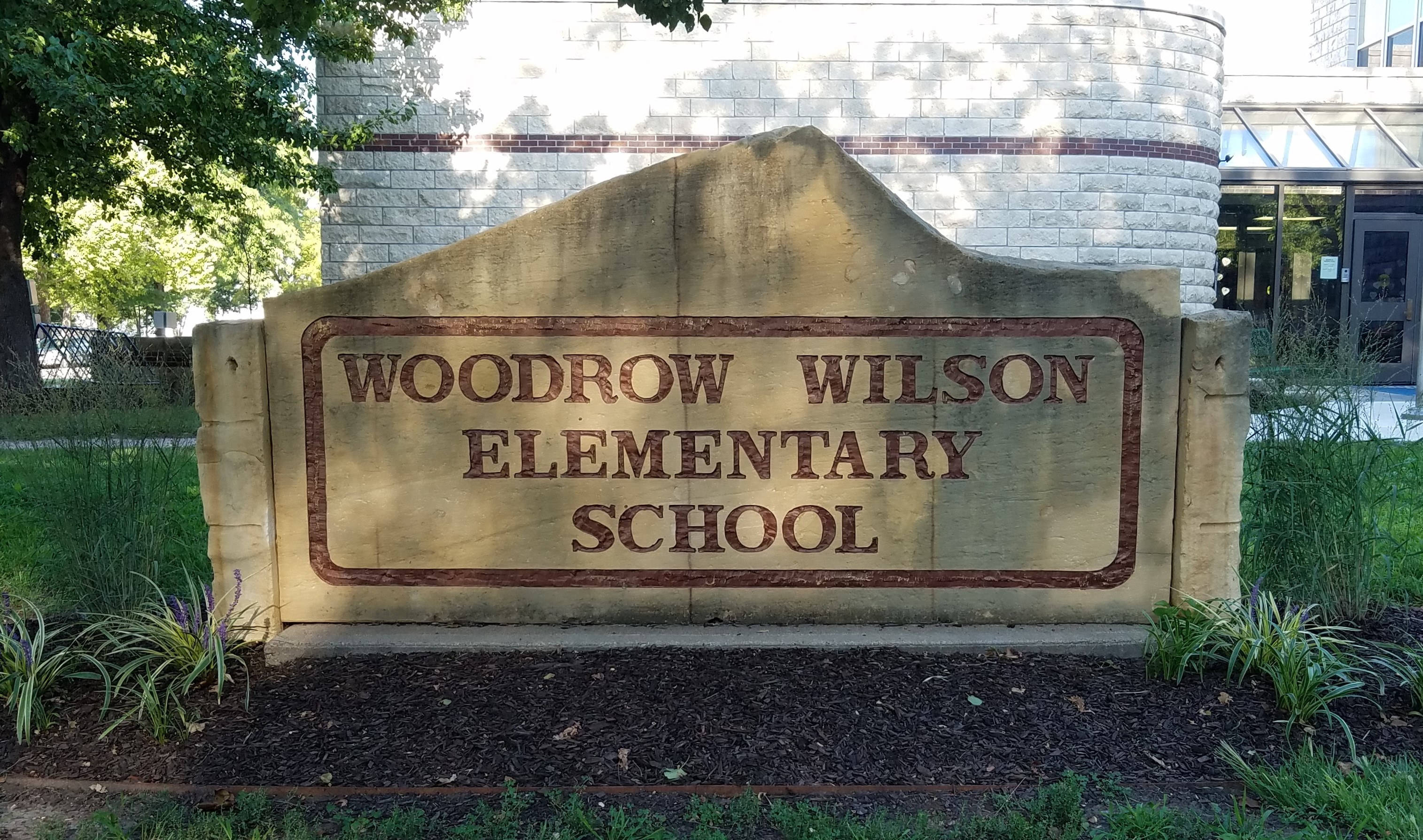
Sign: Woodrow Wilson Elementary School, Manhattan

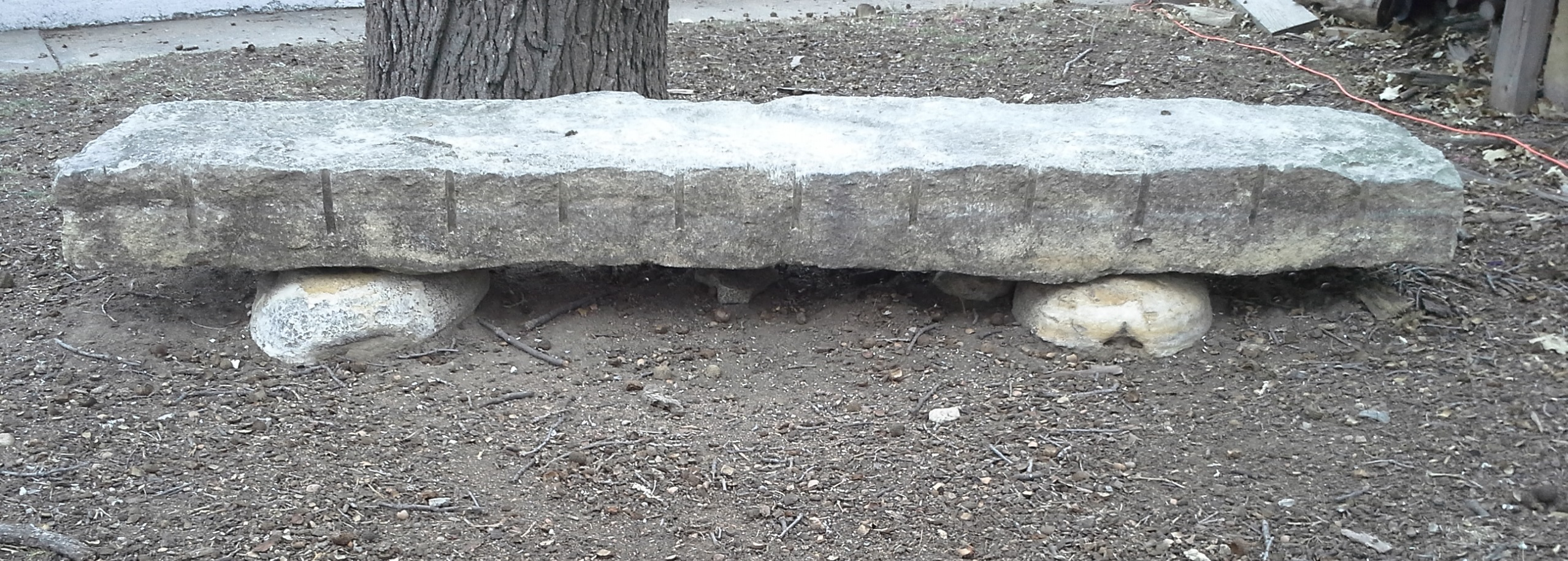
Stone bench from a thicker section of the bed, Ellis County

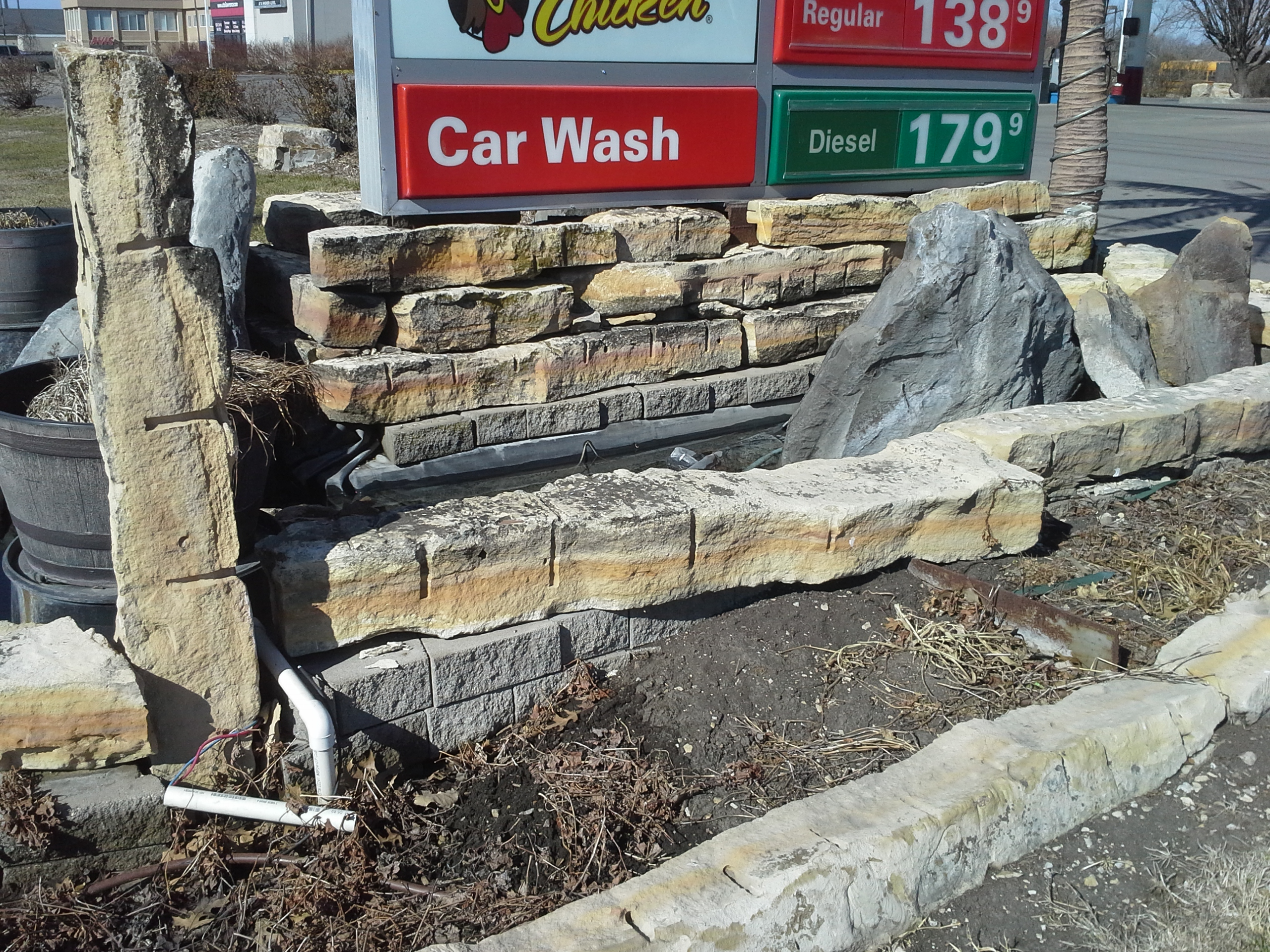
Convenience store landscaping, Lawrence

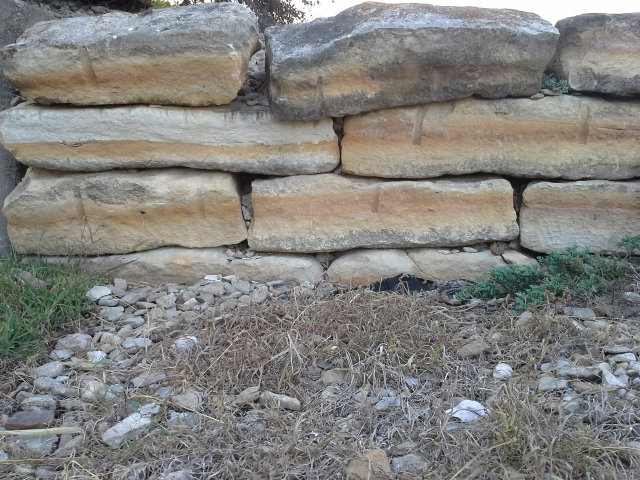
Retaining wall, Riley County

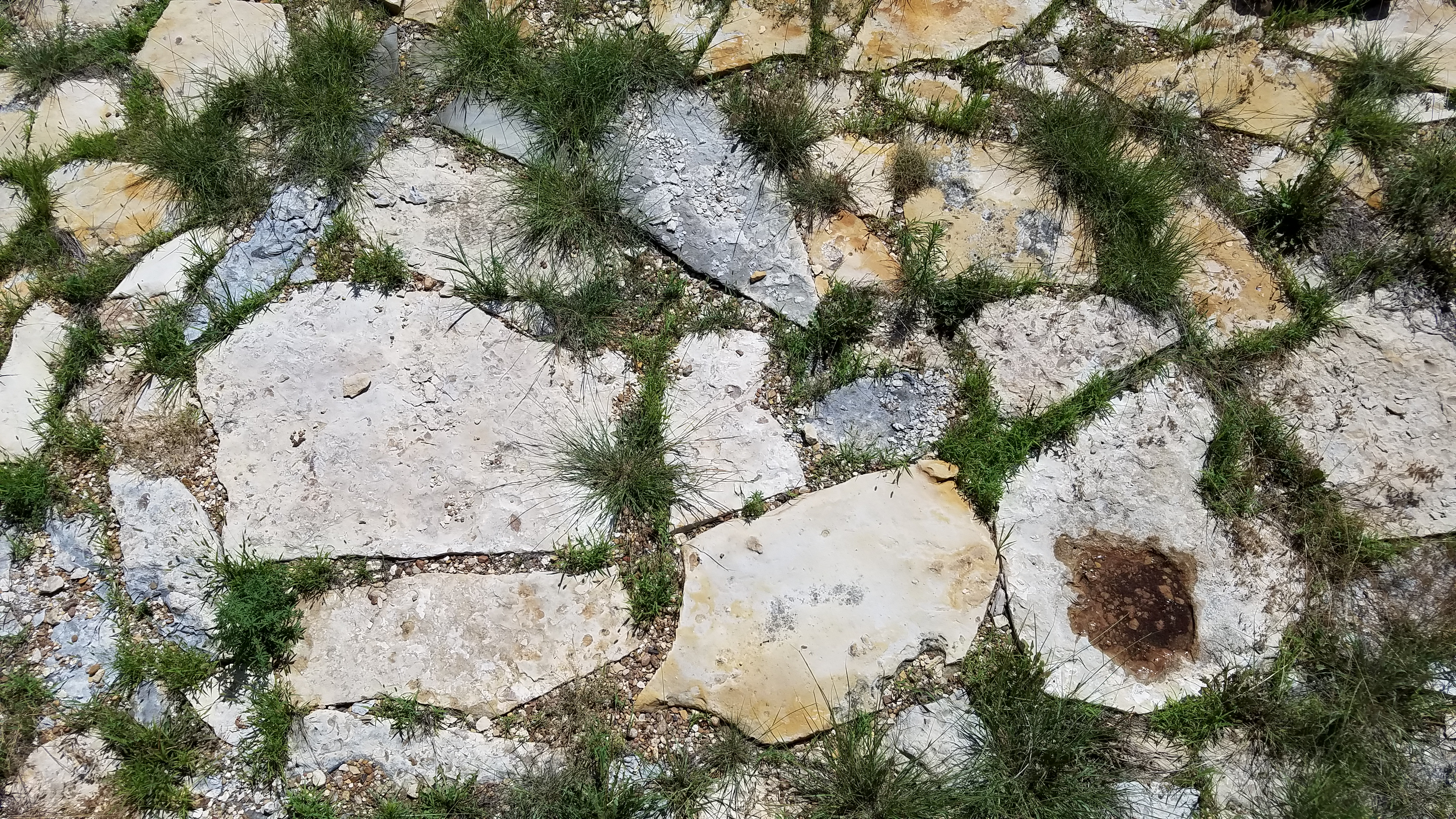
Flagging for a patio, Ellis Co.

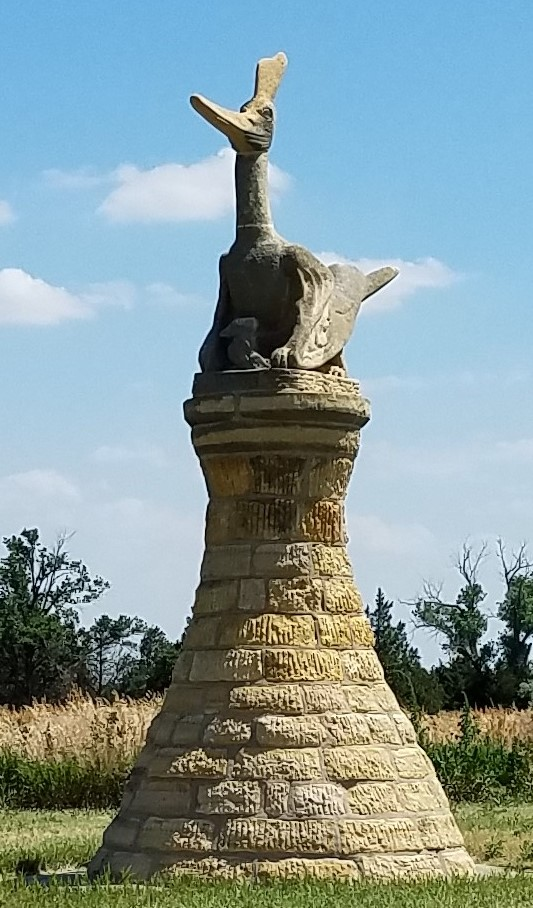
Pteranodon (2000) Pete Felten, Jr The head, bill and crest are carved from a piece of two-toned Fencepost limestone.

=== Sculpture ===
We've got the highest quality quarried limestone anywhere right here.

— Peter Felten, Jr.

Roughly only a foot thick, fine-grained Fencepost limestone has seen limited use in public sculpture. However, the ability to make large stone slabs has seen the adaptation of the bed to bas-relief. The bas-relief technique permits the artist to manipulate the variations of tone within the slab. Past Victoria sculptor John Linenberger used this technique in a carving on the convent adjoining the St. Fidelis Church, carving through the brown layer to expose the lighter interior stone. Hays sculptor Peter "Fritz" Felten, Jr., used the same technique in plaques mounted in the sloping pedestal of his Monarch of the Plains at the Fort Hays State Historic Site.

More recent Pete Felten sculptures, Train Hwy (1995) and Pteranodon (2000), demonstrate use of the tones of the Post Rock, which locally can have outer brown layers with a lighter inner core. In Pteranodon, displayed at Exit 161 on Interstate 70, the head is carved from brown Fencepost limestone, oriented so that the dinosaur's crest and bill are the exposed lighter-shade inner core of the limestone.

The multi-tone effect is also seen in Stone Post slab sculptures displayed at the Fossil Station Convenience Store at Russell, adjacent to exit 184 of I-70. The weathered Post Rock used here is particularly white, but with a blackened top layer and red-toned inner core. One bas-relief carving is of a Buffalo, the shallow cut into the blackened layer meant to suggest the dark hide of the bison. The other carving is of the Hereford breed of cattle, a breed with red body and white face; the stone is carved so as to reveal the redness in contrast to white face and horns.

California sculptor Fred Whitman has carved several sculptures from antique Stone Posts. Near Lucas, Fred has carved faces of four Lucas residents into four Stone Posts standing in fences along the Post Rock Scenic Byway.

Sculptures in two-tone Fencepost Limestone
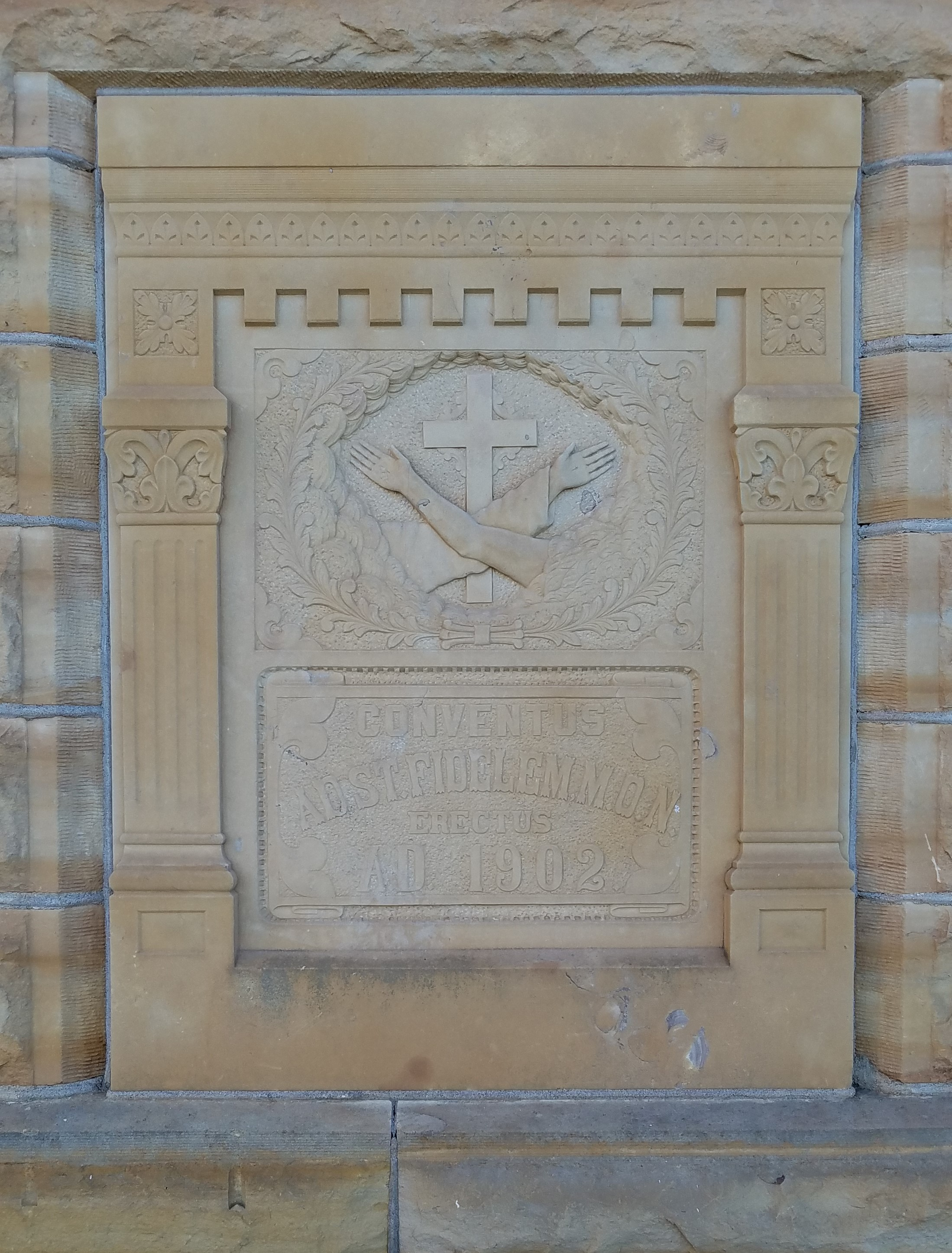
Plaque at Saint Fidelis
John Linenberger
Victoria, Kansas

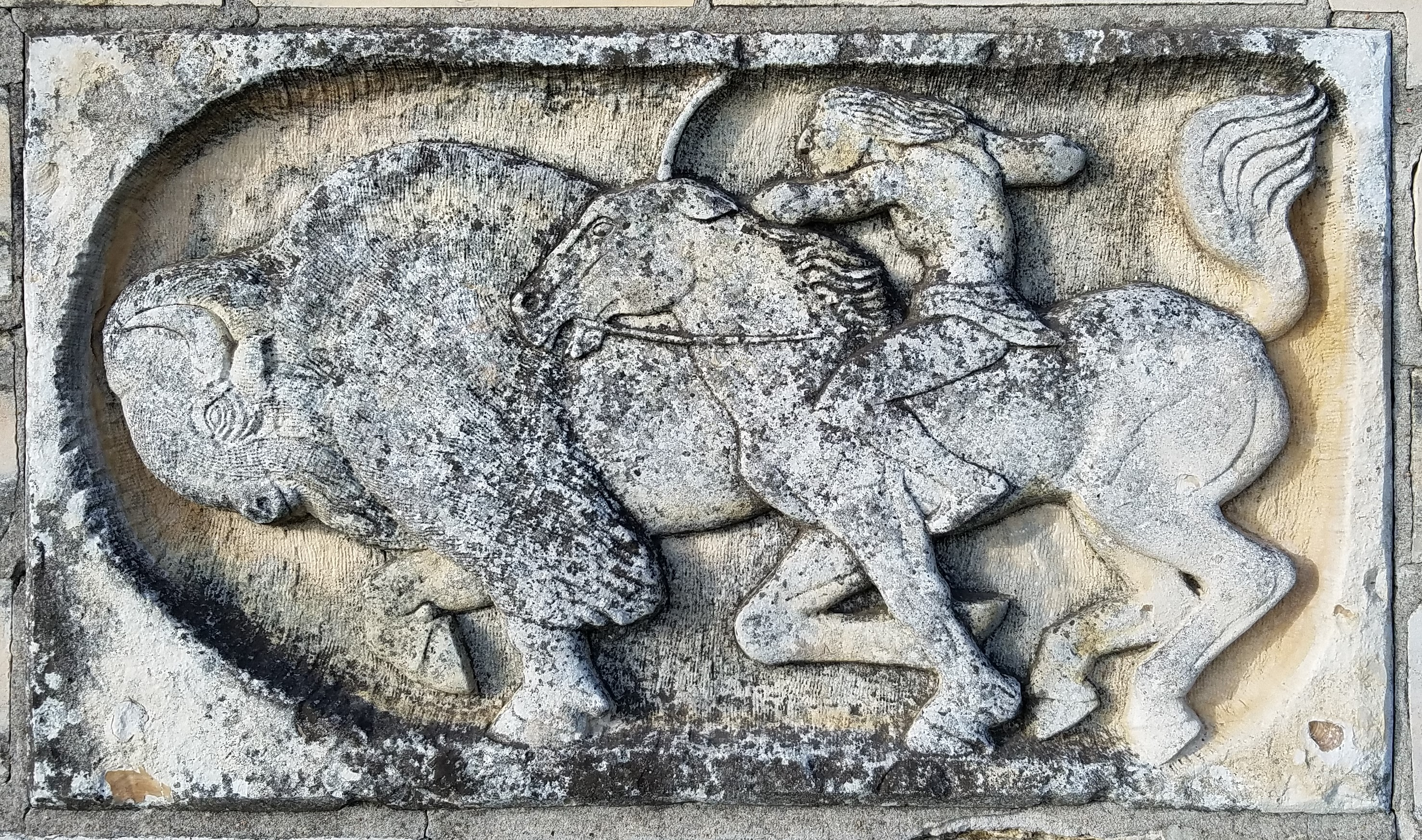
[Buffalo Hunt] (1967)
Peter Felten, Jr.
Hays, Kansas

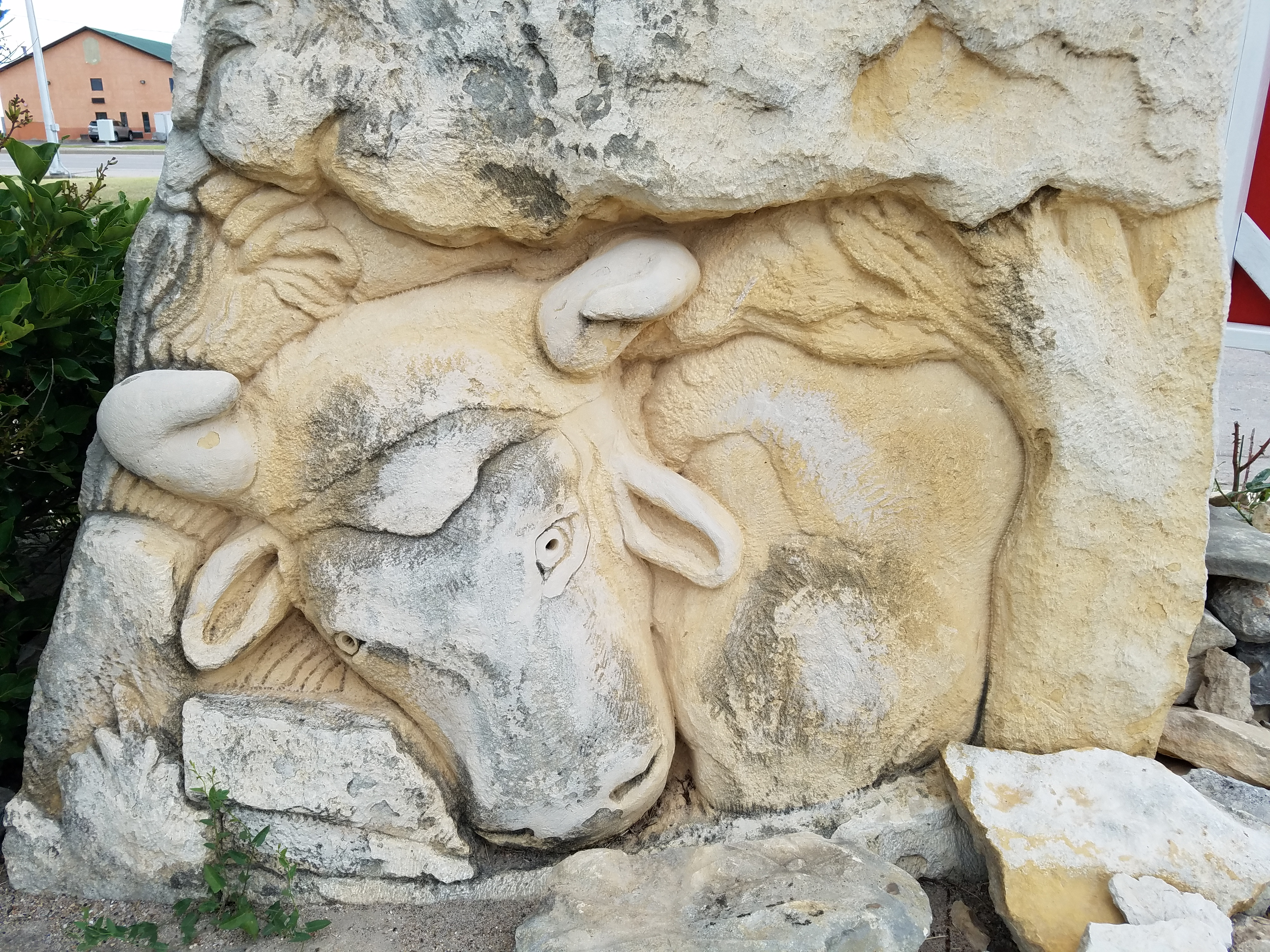
A Post Rock Hereford (1992) [Christie]
Russell, Kansas

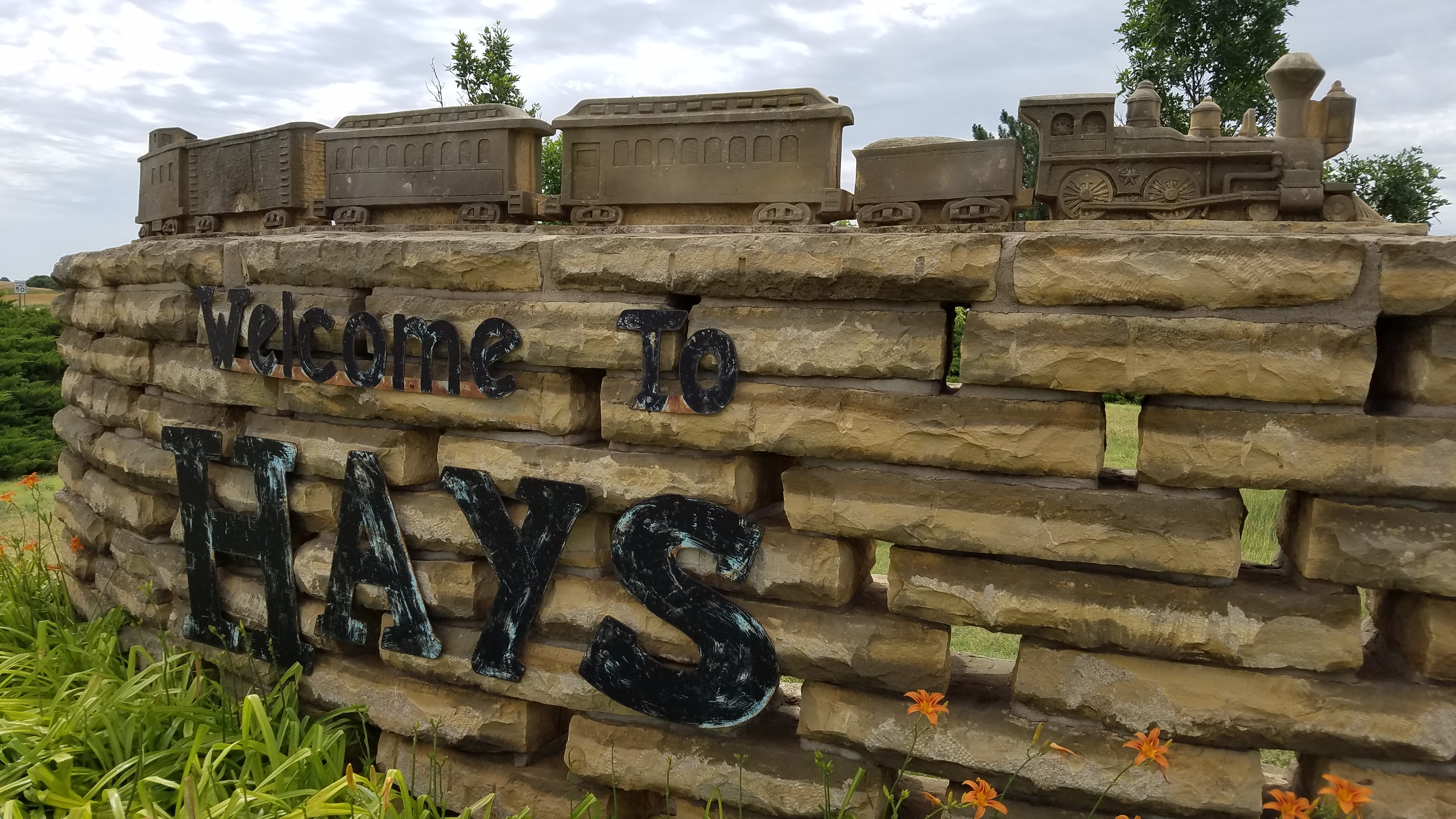
Train Hwy (1995)
Peter Felten, Jr.
Hays, Kansas
Kansas Stone Post Iconography
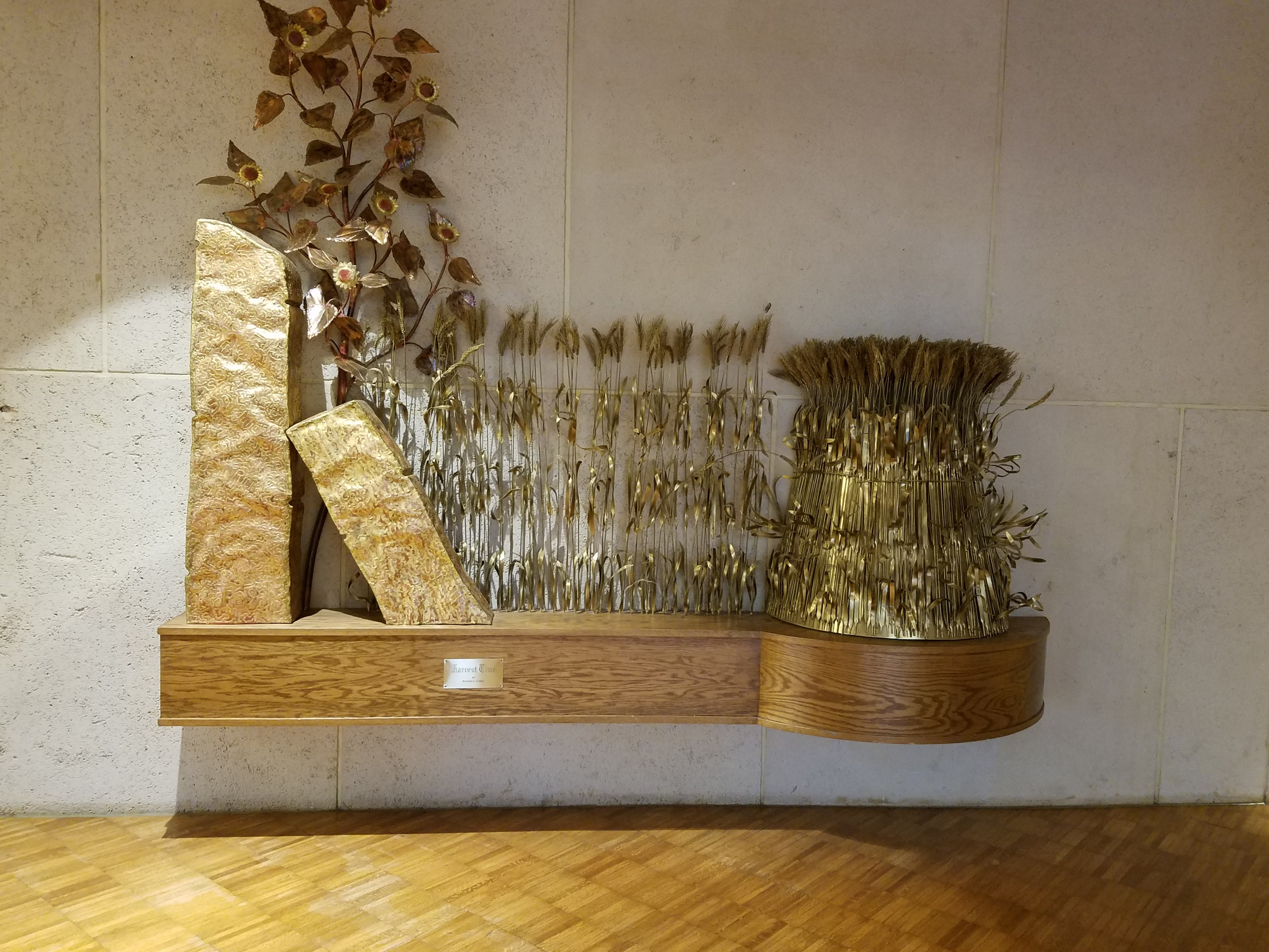
Harvest Time at Kansas Museum of History

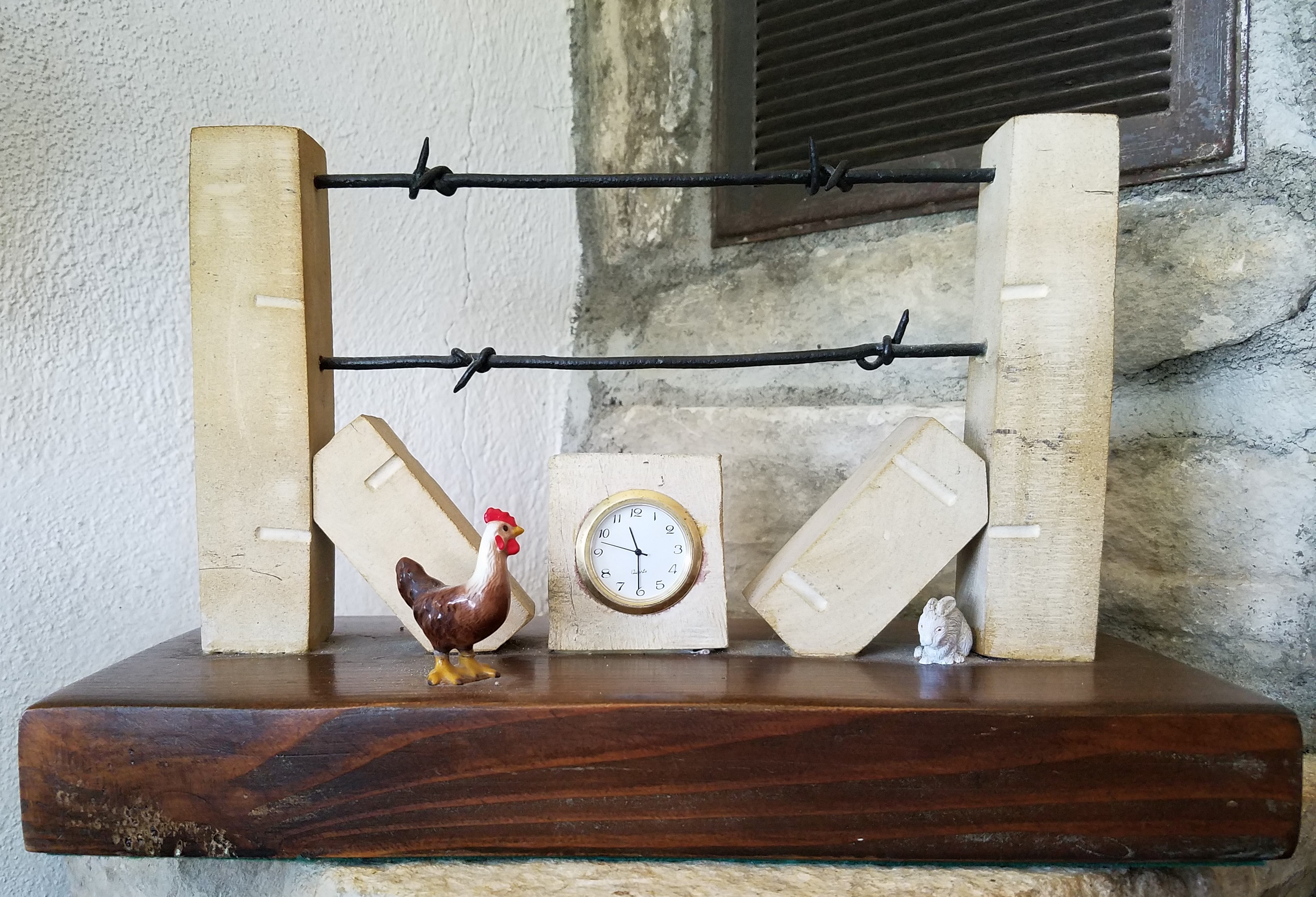
Miniature Fenceposts

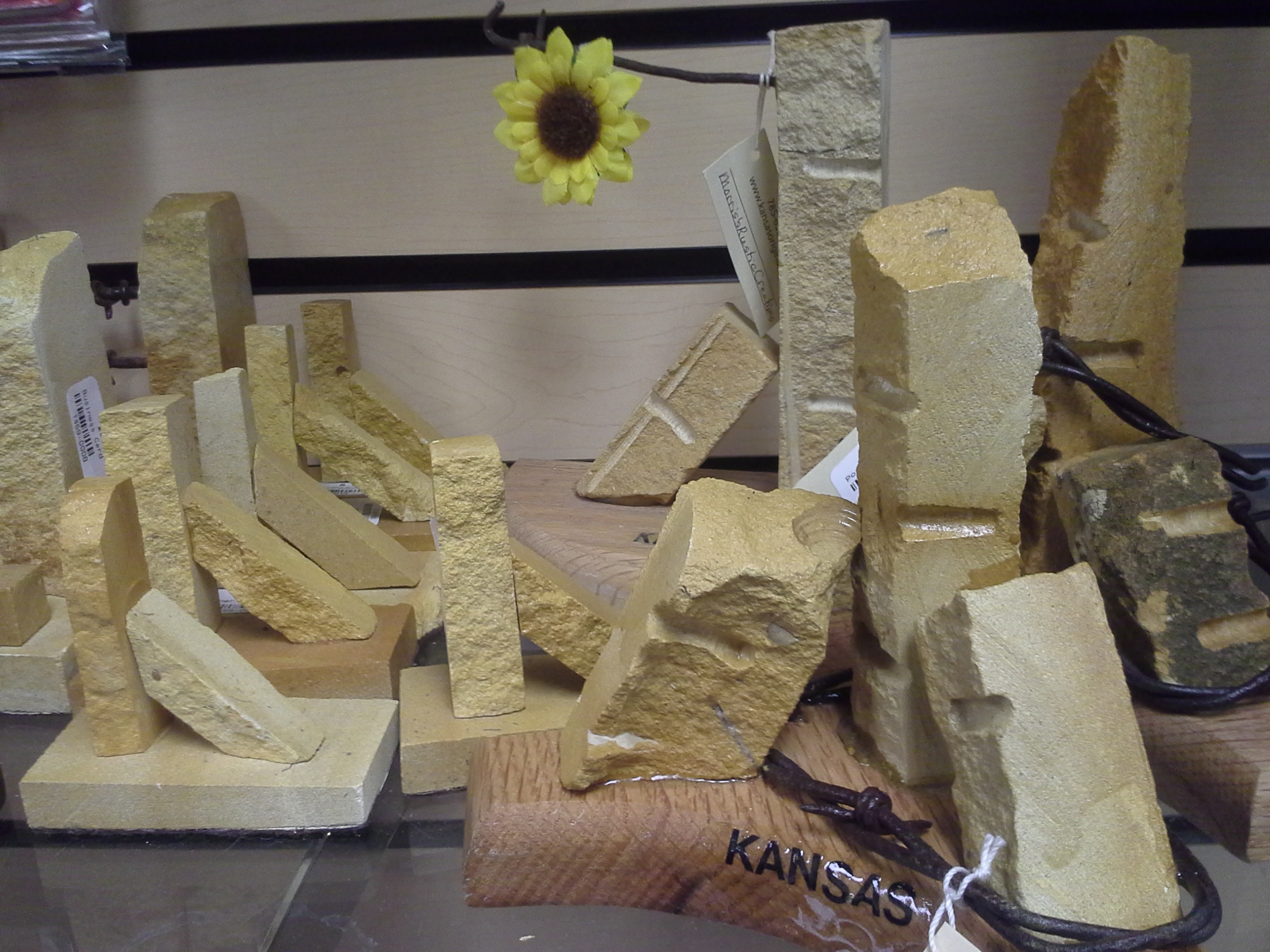
Miniature Fencepost limestone souvineirs

=== Hydrocarbon exploration ===
The Fencepost limestone has a particular usefulness in hydrocarbon exploration. While it is certainly too thin to be a viable hydrocarbon reserve, even for fracking, the Fencepost is located close to known producing layers, and has a particular quality that is useful in locating them. The Fencepost shows a unique "double-peak" or "prolonged kick" in electric well logs, and can be used to locate reserve formations in several states north and west of Kansas. Consequently, the Fencepost bed has been used as a datum (a fixed reference point) in charting subterranean sections of rock lying under the High Plains.

== Lithology ==
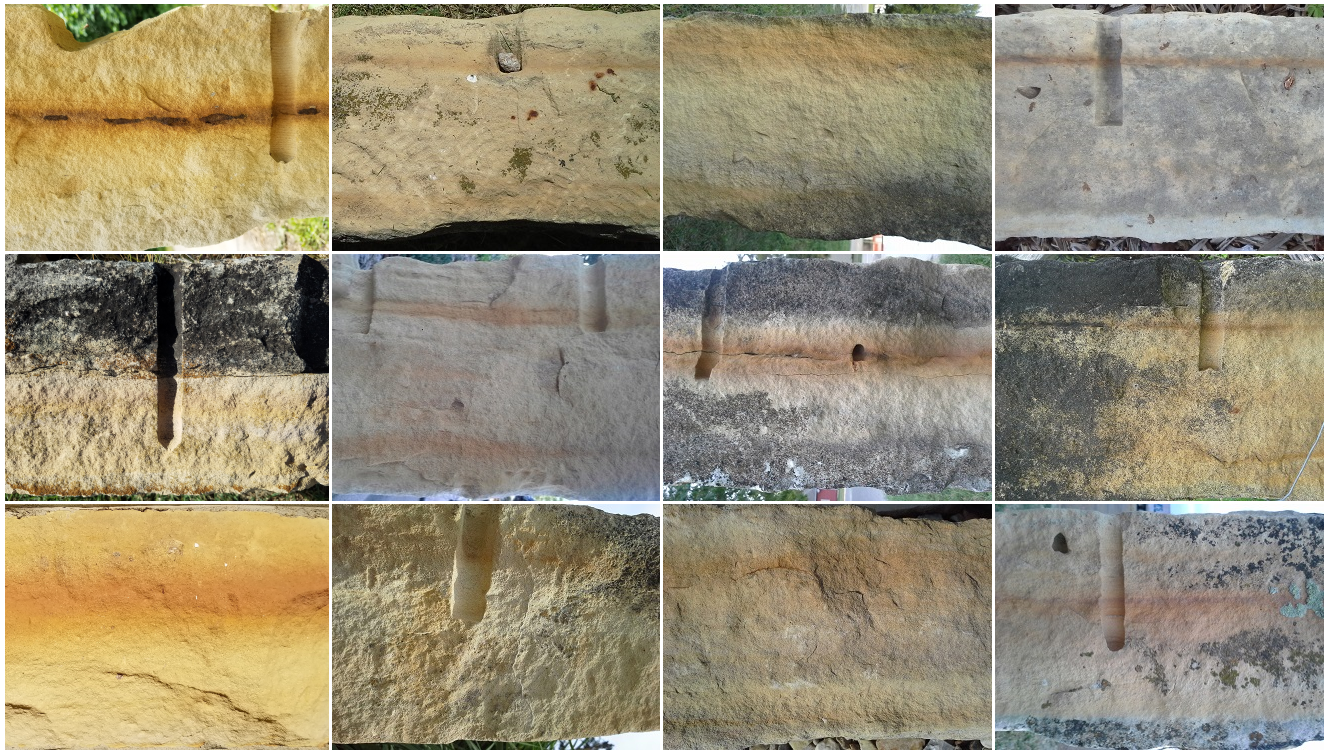
Collage of Fencepost coloration

See: Greenhorn lithologic character

Like several of the thin limestones of the upper Greenhorn and lower Carlile, the Fencepost bed is a shell-rich, coccolithic, chalky limestone; however, this bed is hardened by a crystalline matrix of sparry concretory calcite so that it is more resistant to weathering and erosion. Unexposed, the Fencepost is olive-gray, weathering to light grey on exposures. When well exposed, it lightens to buff and yellow-orange with one or more orange, rust, or brown streaks. This coloration is due to limonite (rust), an oxide of iron, and is a trace effect of volcanic activity in the Sevier orogeny. Across the range of the outcrop, the limonite weathers out in a variety of shades and patterns as seen the collage on the right. This coloration varies from barely visible to one, two, or more shaded zones. The exposed stone often weathers out a parting seam, also seen in the collage, used split the limestone into thinner slabs for flagging. Limonite is often concentrated along the parting seam, sometimes to the point of forming small nodules or concretions. The top and bottom of the post's bedding can blacken with prolonged exposure to the weather above ground.

== Stratigraphy ==
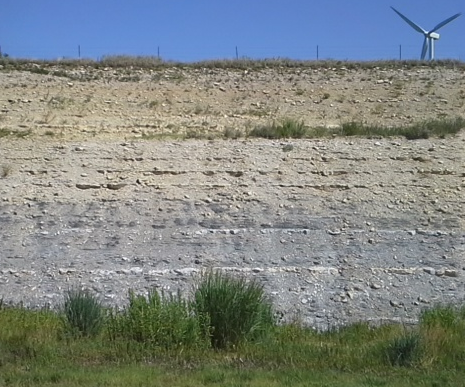
The layers of shale and limestone of the Greenhorn that lie beneath the Fencepost at the top

The regional reputation of the Fencepost limestone bed belies its physical size and relative rank in the rock layers associated with the lower Colorado Group.

The majority of the particular Western Interior Seaway sequence above and below the Fencepost bed, a group of layers originally called the Benton Group, is characterized by gray, dark gray, or blue-gray flaky shales. This is in contrast to the red and yellow massive sandstones and clays of the Dakota Formation below and the massive buff limestone and chalk beds of the Niobrara Formation above. Distinct from most of the overlying Carlile Shale formation, the members of the Graneros Shale and Greenhorn Limestone formations feature many thin, repeating "rhythmic" layers of limestone and shale. This feature is well displayed by the Jetmore Chalk and Pfeifer Shale members, but is seen in some form in all members and extends above the Fencepost bed into the Fairport Chalk member of the Carlile.

So, the Fencepost limestone can be seen as just one thin chalky limestone bed out of dozens of superficially similar, thin chalky limestone beds. It is also not the only such bed in that strata to have an orange streak. It is not even the thickest limestone bed in those formations (the Jetmore Chalk Shellrock bed is the thickest). However, it is still thicker than most of the other local limestones and it is particularly most resistant to weathering and so it forms the tops of the central ridges and plateaus of the Smoky Hills.

=== Benton limestone ===
The Fencepost bed has also been called Benton limestone for its prominence as a marker for the now generally obsolete Fort Benton Group classification. Before the 1930s, the chalky shales between the Dakota and the Niobrara formations were called the Fort Benton formation or Benton Limestone. As noted, the greyish, chalky shale with great many thin limestones between those formations stood in sharp contrast to the massive orange/red sandstone below and the massive buff limestone and chalk above. It was this distinctiveness that led to the initial classification of this sequence as the Benton Group with the Fencepost limestone as the central marker. There being only one limestone in the Benton generally suitable for construction use, and that one also being the only one containing abundant Collignoniceras woollgari fossils, when any literature describes a building as built out of "Benton limestone" (a more common usage years ago in Hays), it should be taken as being the Fencepost limestone.

== Paleoenvironment ==
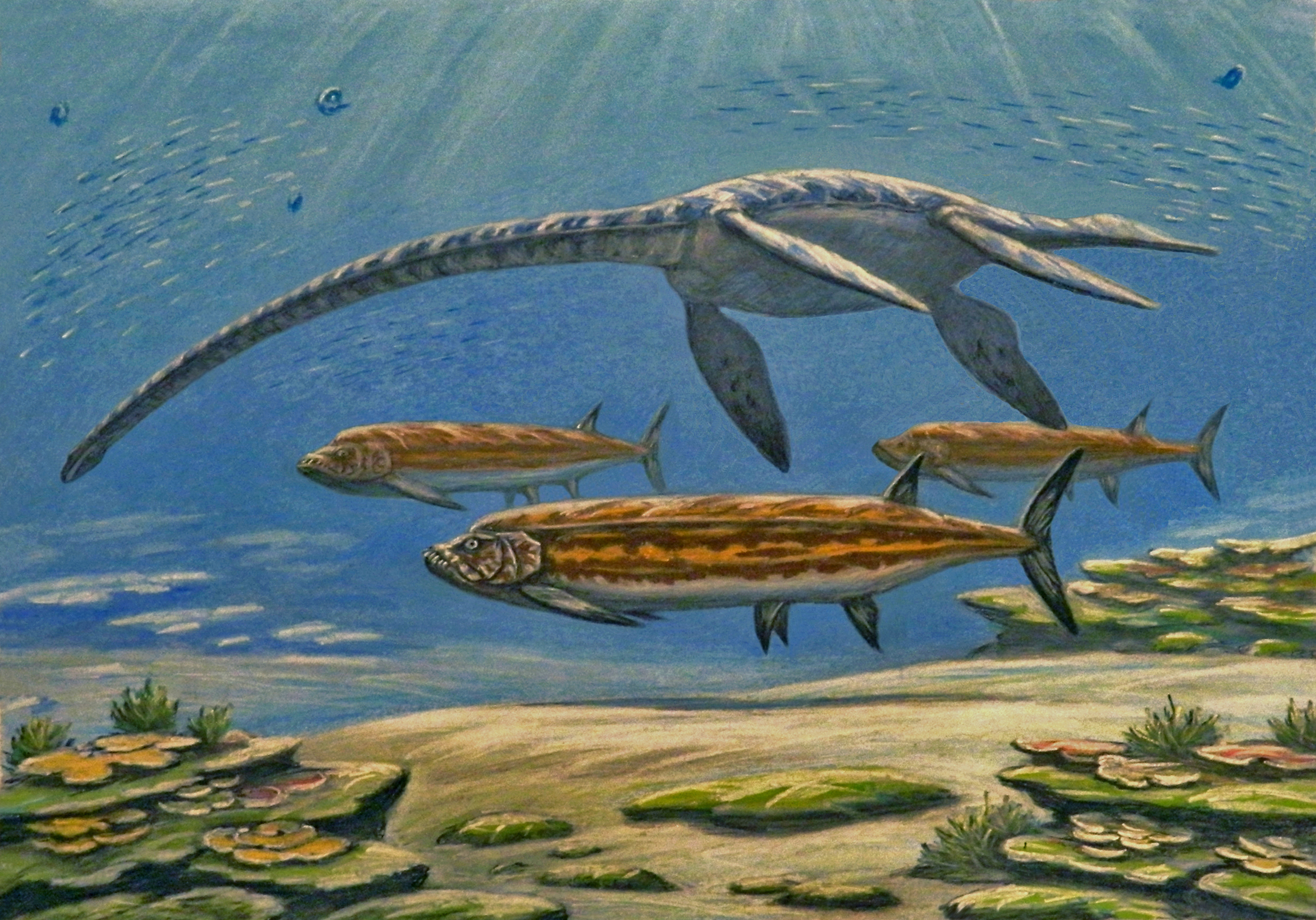
Large predators of the late Cretaceous, Pliosauroidea and Xiphactinus

Based on the consistency of the structures and fossils above and below the Fencepost bed, the general depositional environment of the Fencepost is considered to be the same as both the Fairport Chalk above and the Pfeiffer Shale below. In fact it has been commented that bed does not really mark any real, overall change in species or environmental patterns.

These layers are interpreted as representing the maximal extent and depth of the Greenhorn cycle of the Western Interior Seaway, with the Fencepost practically marking the central event. Depths are estimated to be only 100–500 feet (30–152 m), venturing into the Mesopelagic (twilight) depths, perhaps even to 1,000 feet (300 m) or more. This was a place and time of open seas with little direct sedimentary or nutrient influence from land, although petrified sunken driftwood is not extremely rare within the Fencepost. There was generally limited oxygen at the seafloor, and bottom currents were weak, but sufficient for tidal feeders. The primary source material for the chalky deposits was remains of the productive algae and plankton of the warm sea that precipitated onto the sea floor (after having been digested and pelletized by tiny animals). The resulting carbonate mud supported hardly any foraminifera. Only bivalves that were adapted to "floating on the mud", or those sessile, tidal feeding creatures that could attach to such shells, could thrive on this bottom. Consequently, the floor itself was frequently covered with mollusks, especially species of Inoceramus, ranging in size from few millimeters to well over a meter, themselves encrusted with oysters.

There were several species of free-swimming ammonites, Baculites, and belemnites, which serve as index fossils within the members of the Greenhorn and Carlile formations. Abundant fish populations of the Greenhorn sea supported the largest of predators; great fish, sharks, and reptiles alike, including plesiosaurs, mosasaurs, elasmosaurs, and Xiphactinus.

=== Fossils ===
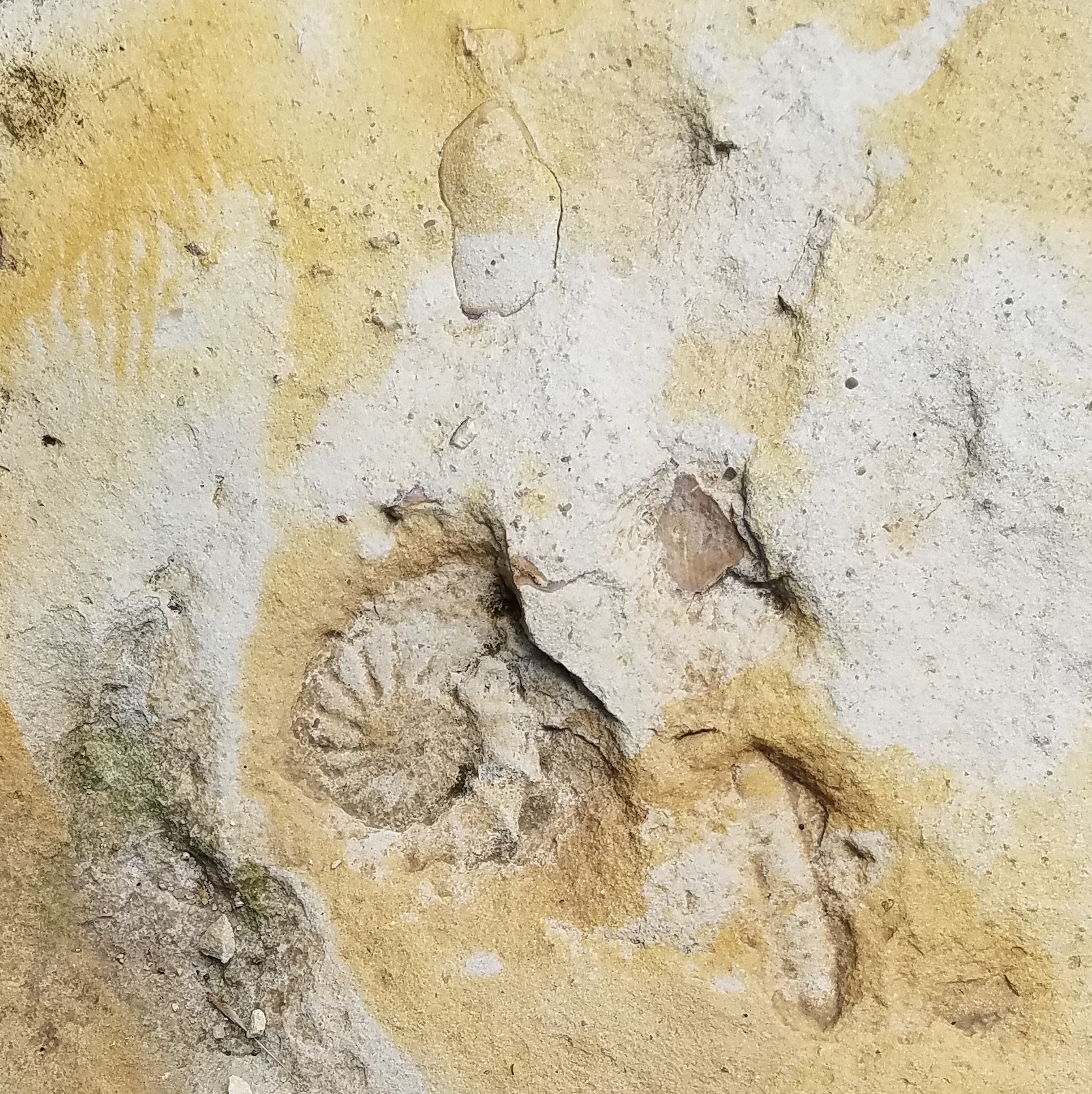
Fencepost assemblage: I. cuvieri (outline); I. labiatus (fragment); C. woollgari (spiral); B. yokoyamai (tube)

More than any other rock bed in of the lower Colorado Group, the Fencepost makes durable displays of marine fossils of the Cenomanian and Turonian ages; particularly in shiner-laid masonry, fenceposts, landscaping pieces, and flagging. Visible fossils present in the Fencepost limestone bed are the same invertebrate fossils of the Pfeifer Shale member, which also continue into the lower Fairport Chalk member. The presence of these particular index fossils species helps identify the Fencepost bed as distinct from the limestone beds of the Fairport Chalk above and the Jetmore Chalk member below. The most easily spotted fossil is the Inoceramus (Mytiloides) labiatus (Schlotheim), including a broad/flat form subpopulation that appears in the vicinity of the Fencepost. Other common Fencepost fossils include Inoceramus cuvieri Sowerby, Collignoniceras woollgari, Baculites yokoyamai Tokunaga and Shizimu, and Pseudoperna bentonensis (Ostrea congesta var. bentonensis)

Fossils in the Fencepost Limestone
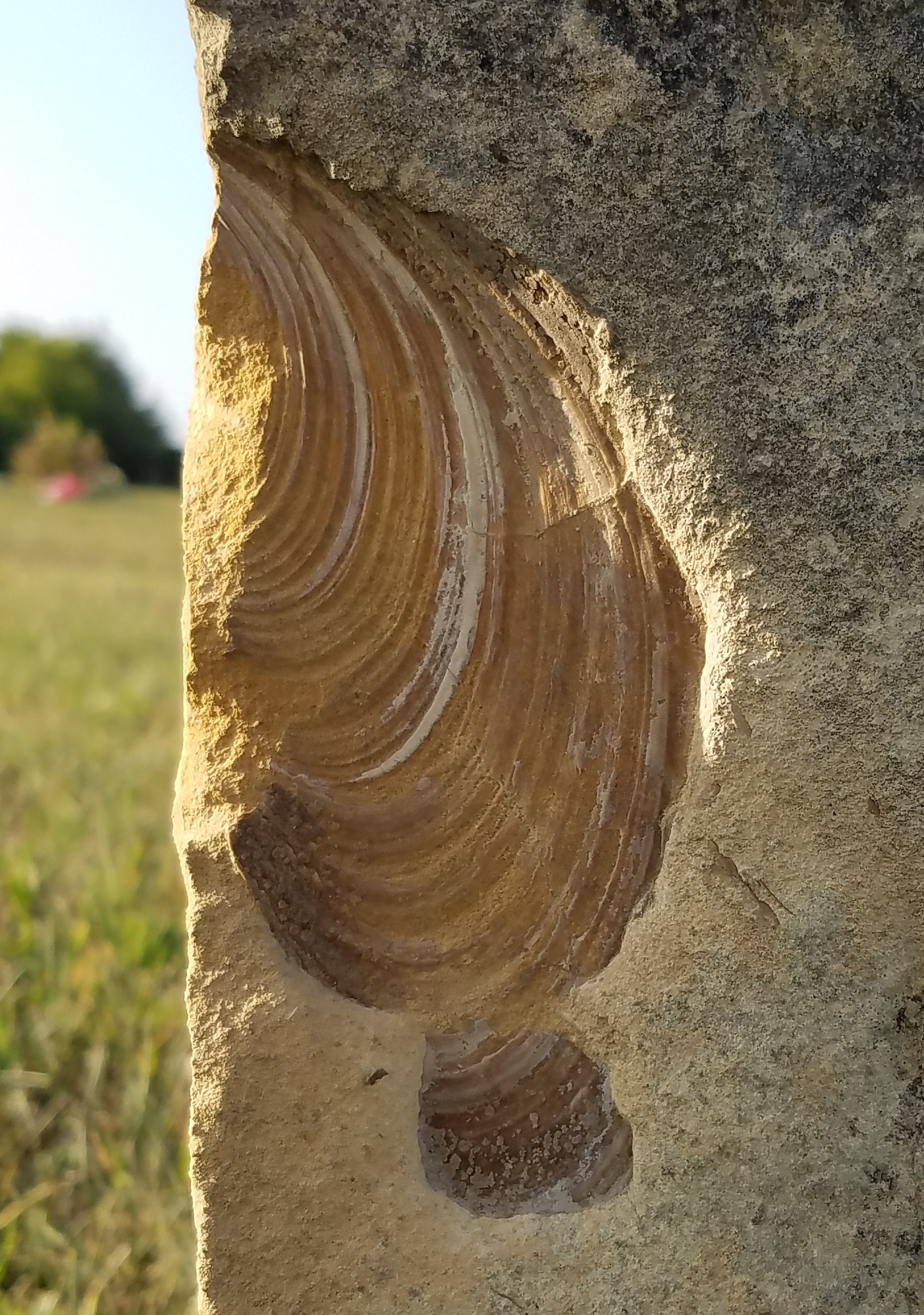
Inoceramus labiatus (flat form)

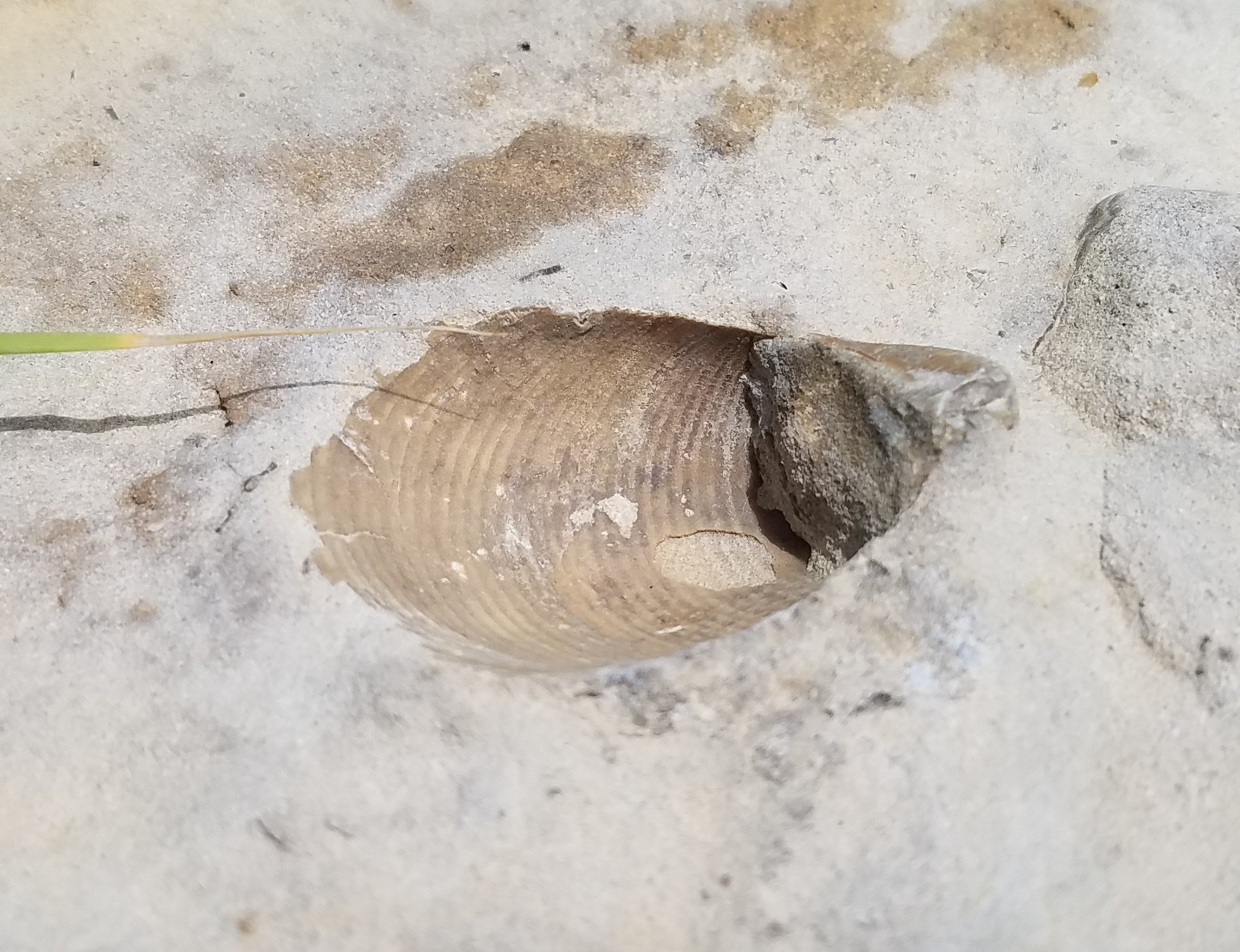
Inoceramus cuvieri (interior)

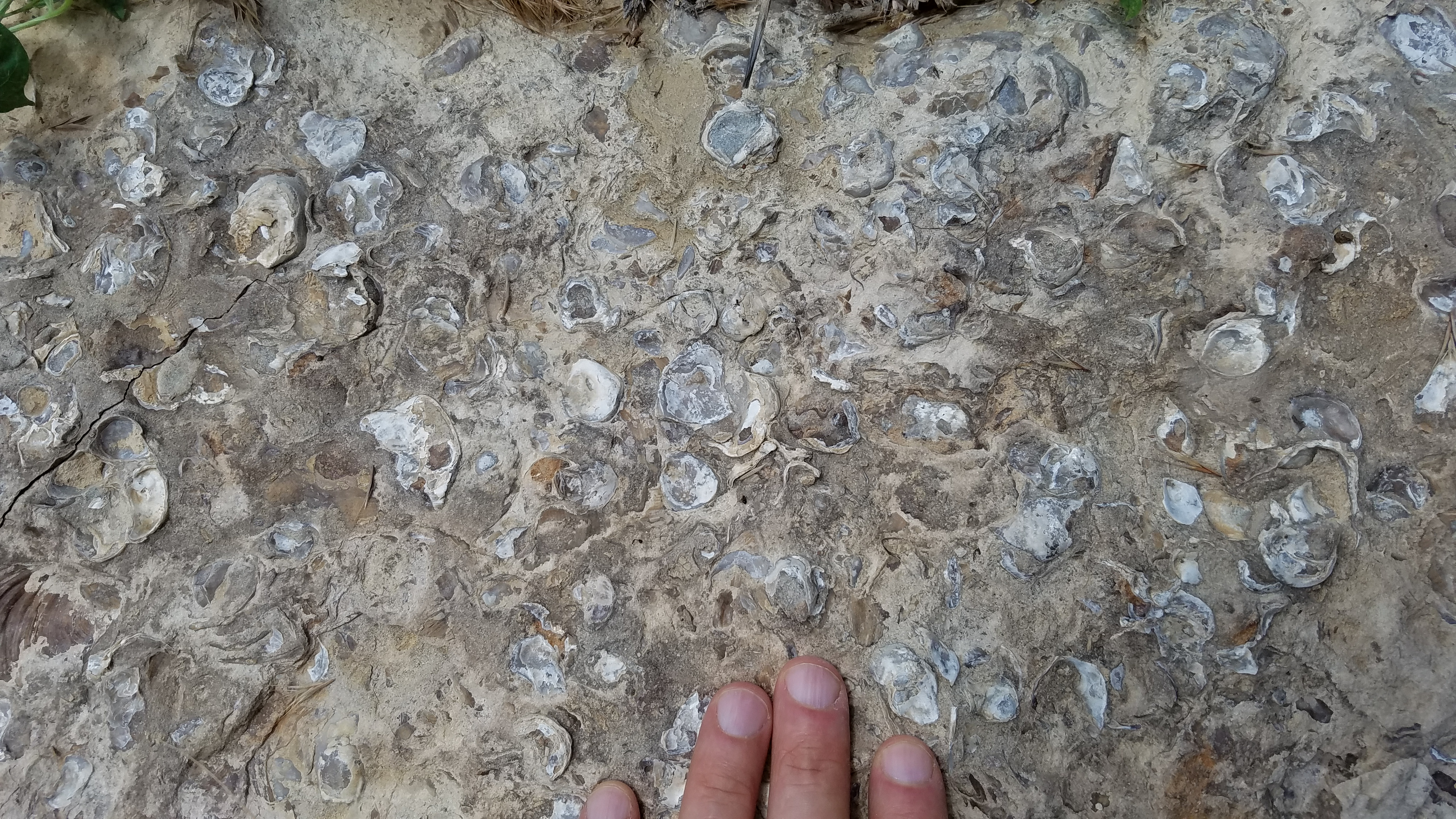
Bed of Pseudoperna bentonensis

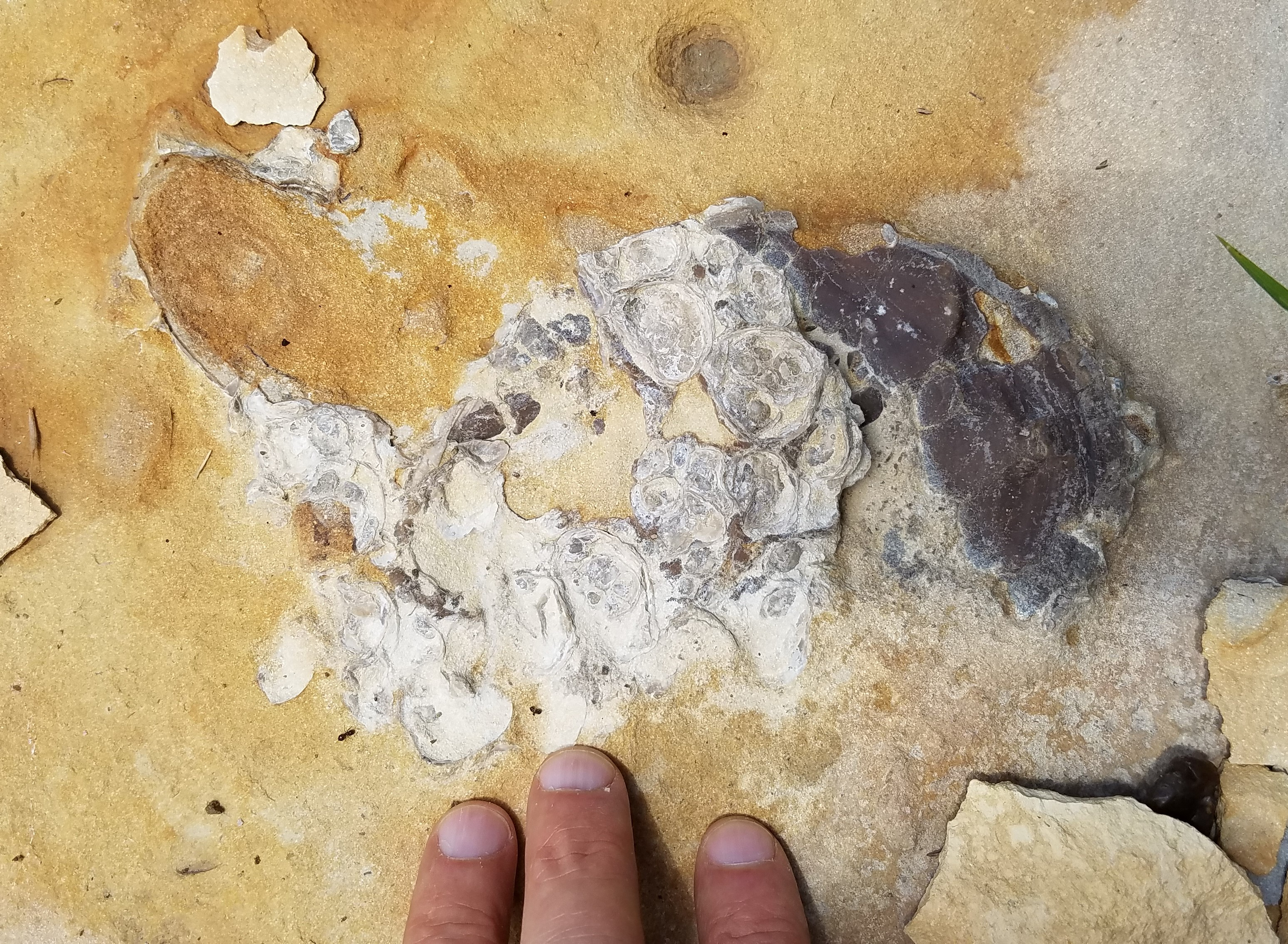
P. bentonensis on the shell of an I. labiatus

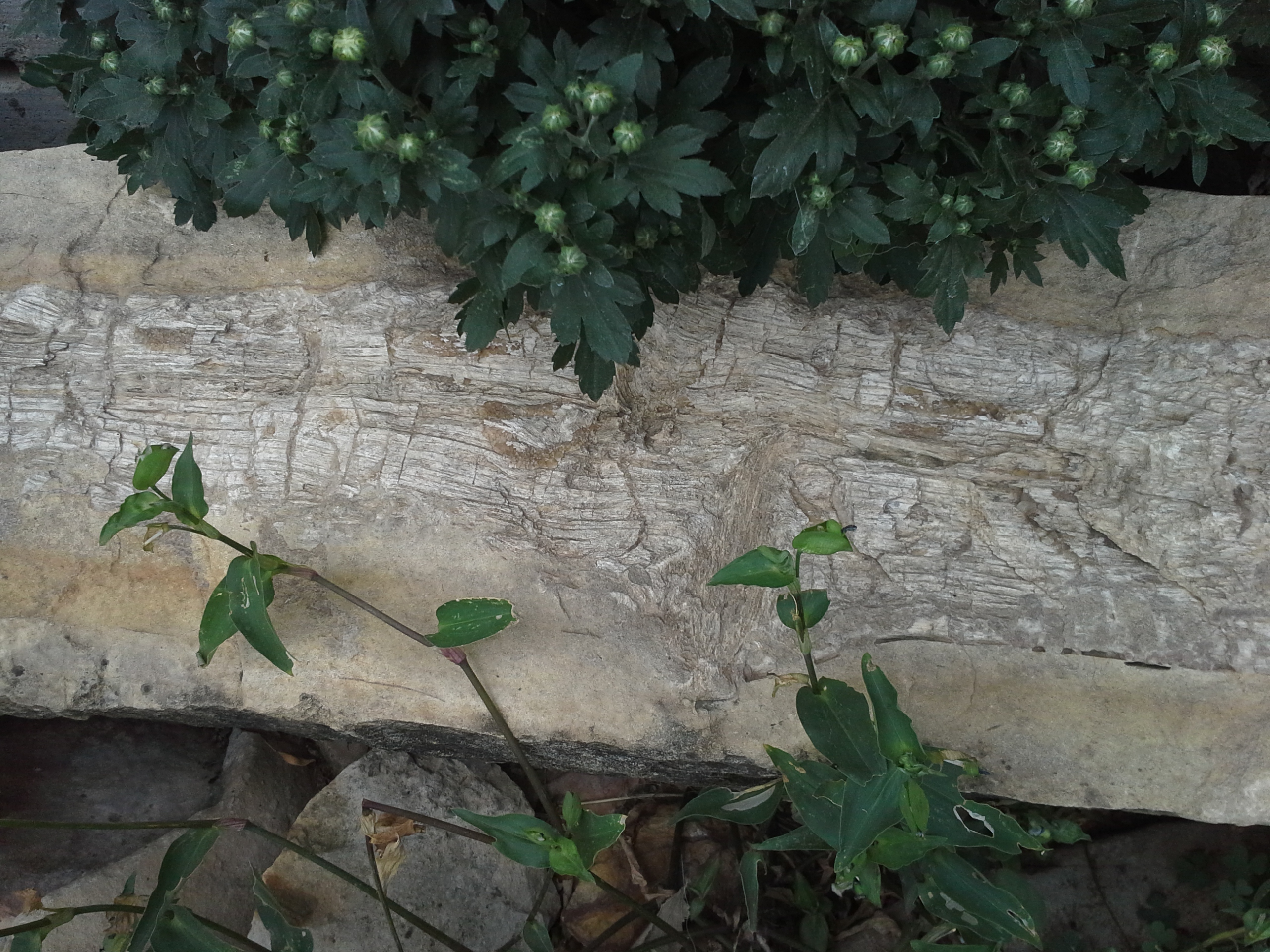
Calcite petrified wood inside a stone fence post

== Geological context ==
The Fencepost bed is a strong marker bed rising almost to member status in significance.

Generally the outcrop is easy to locate and identify: The outcrop of the Fencepost is consistently found forming a bench, bluff, or plateau; fine examples are seen in the bluffs lining the valley at and downstream of Wilson Lake. There is a specific, reliable sequence of shale, limestone, and bentonite marker beds below the Fencepost. While the layers above the bed are equally consistent, they are usually set back from the outcrop by a good distance, often spread out over miles. As such, geologists were naturally encouraged to define the Fencepost as a convenient, upper limiting bed of a formation; the rock layers that formed the steep bluff beneath the Fencepost were named one formation (Greenhorn), while the rock layers that formed the low rolling hills above the Fencepost were named as another formation (Carlile).

So, the Fencepost has been mapped as the topmost bed of both the Pfeiffer Shale member (placing it at the top of the Greenhorn Limestone) as well as at the bottom limit of the Fairport Chalk member (and the Carlile Shale). However; either lithostratigraphically or biostratigraphically, there is little other reason to define members or formations with the Fencepost as a boundary; the lowest several feet of the Fairport Chalk is remarkably similar to the highest several feet of the Pfeifer Shale:

- Both the Pfeiffer and the lower Fairport are chalky, like the rest of the Greenhorn below, but unlike the rest of the Carlile above.
- Both the upper Pfeiffer and the lower Fairport show the characteristic "pillow rock" flatten spheroid concretions.
- Some of the Fairport limestone beds also have similar limonite staining, one with a central brown line with the tendency to split at that seam.
- The fossil species assemblage of the Pfeiffer is seen to continue well into the lower Fairport.

However, along the steep bluffs lining the Smoky Hill and Saline rivers, the Pfeifer and Jetmore are exposed close by the Fencepost, while all but the first 17 feet (5.2 m) of the Fairport is usually laid out some distance from the ledge, often miles.

=== Identification ===
The Fencepost limestone can be identified in the field and in buildings by the unusual character and content of the rock itself; but also by understanding of features of the general geology of the locations, especially the marker beds that prove the identity of the Fencepost bed.

The "Fencepost" limestone forms a conspicuous ledge in the Blue Hills subregion of the Smoky Hills. Both above and below the Fencepost are zones of unusual, flatten spheroid or ovoid limestone concretions. About 6 feet (1.8 meters) below the Fencepost is a small but pervasive marker bed that unambiguously identifies the Fencepost limestone above; the "Sugar Sand", a 1–2 inches (2.5–5.1 cm) bentonite seam filled with a "sand" of calcite crystals.

Fencepost bed markers in the Pfeifer Shale
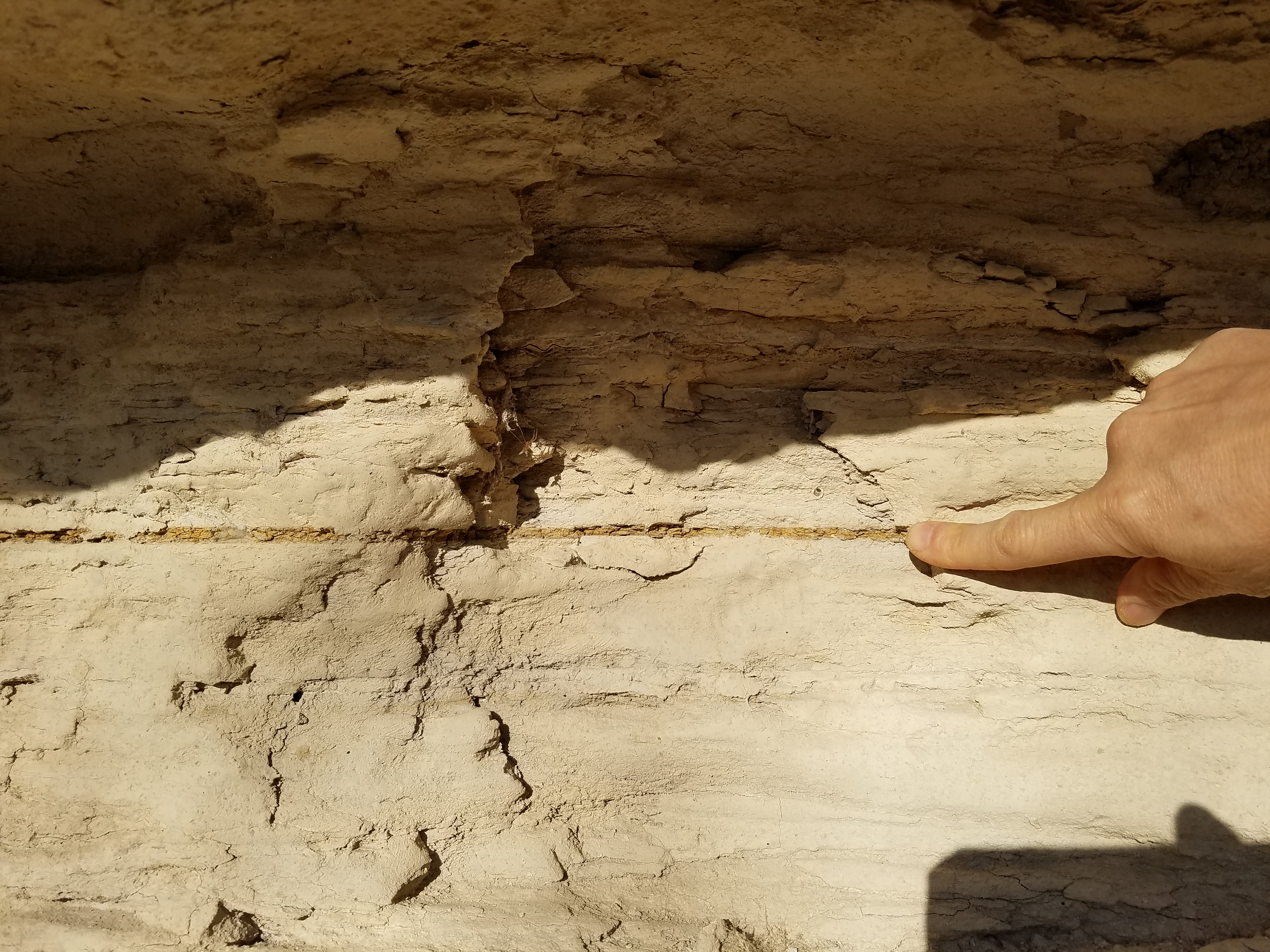
Thin bentonite marker usually in the shadow of the Fencepost's ledge

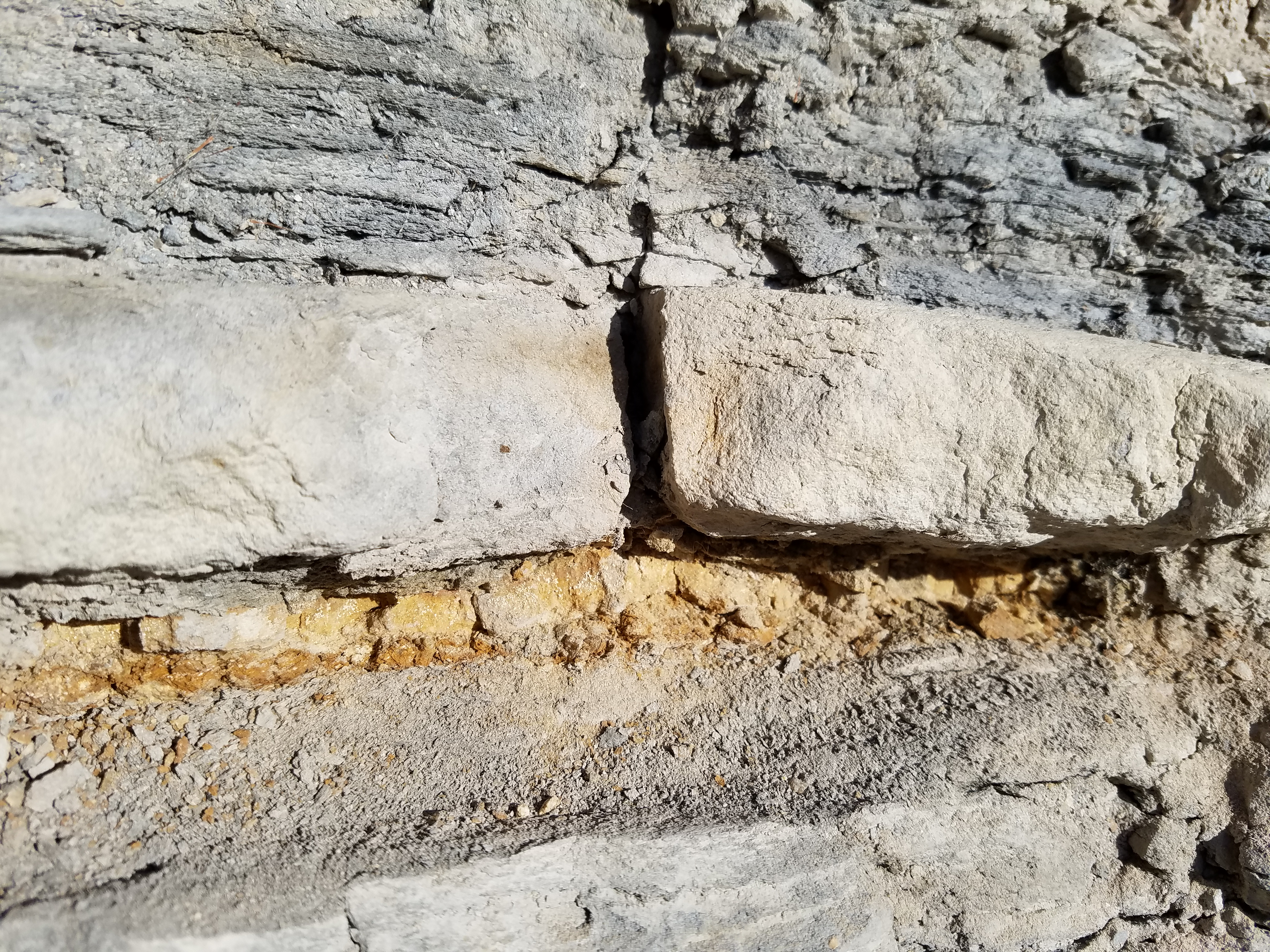
Appearance of the Sugar Sand in southern Ellis County

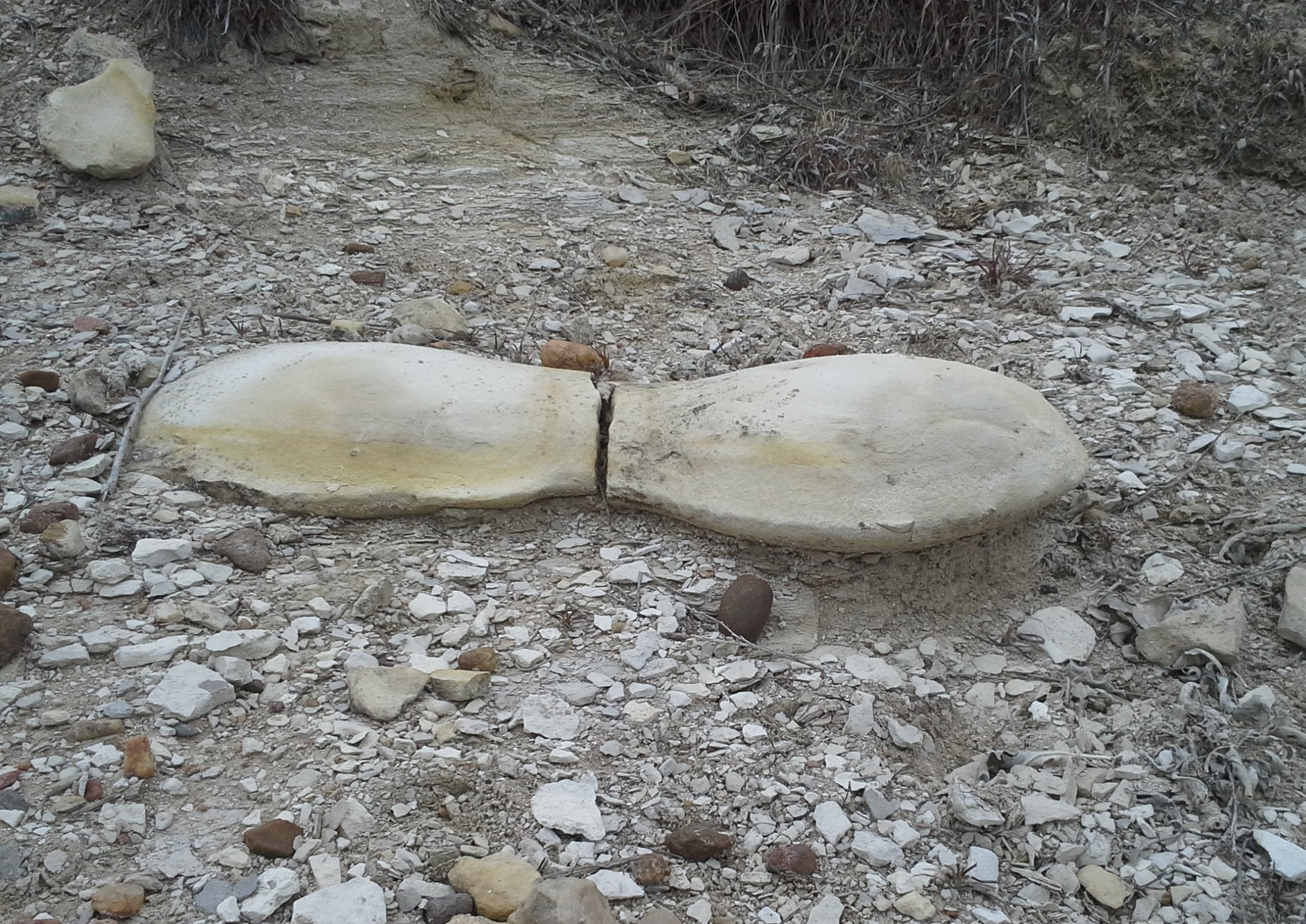
Limestone concretions prove the Fencepost bed is nearby

Other nearby beds

In the field, other nearby limestone beds with similar visual features can be confused for the Fencepost limestone; moreover, some of these limestone beds have also seen limited use in fencing or building. However, these are also prominent marker beds and their features can help locate and identify the Fencepost by comparison.

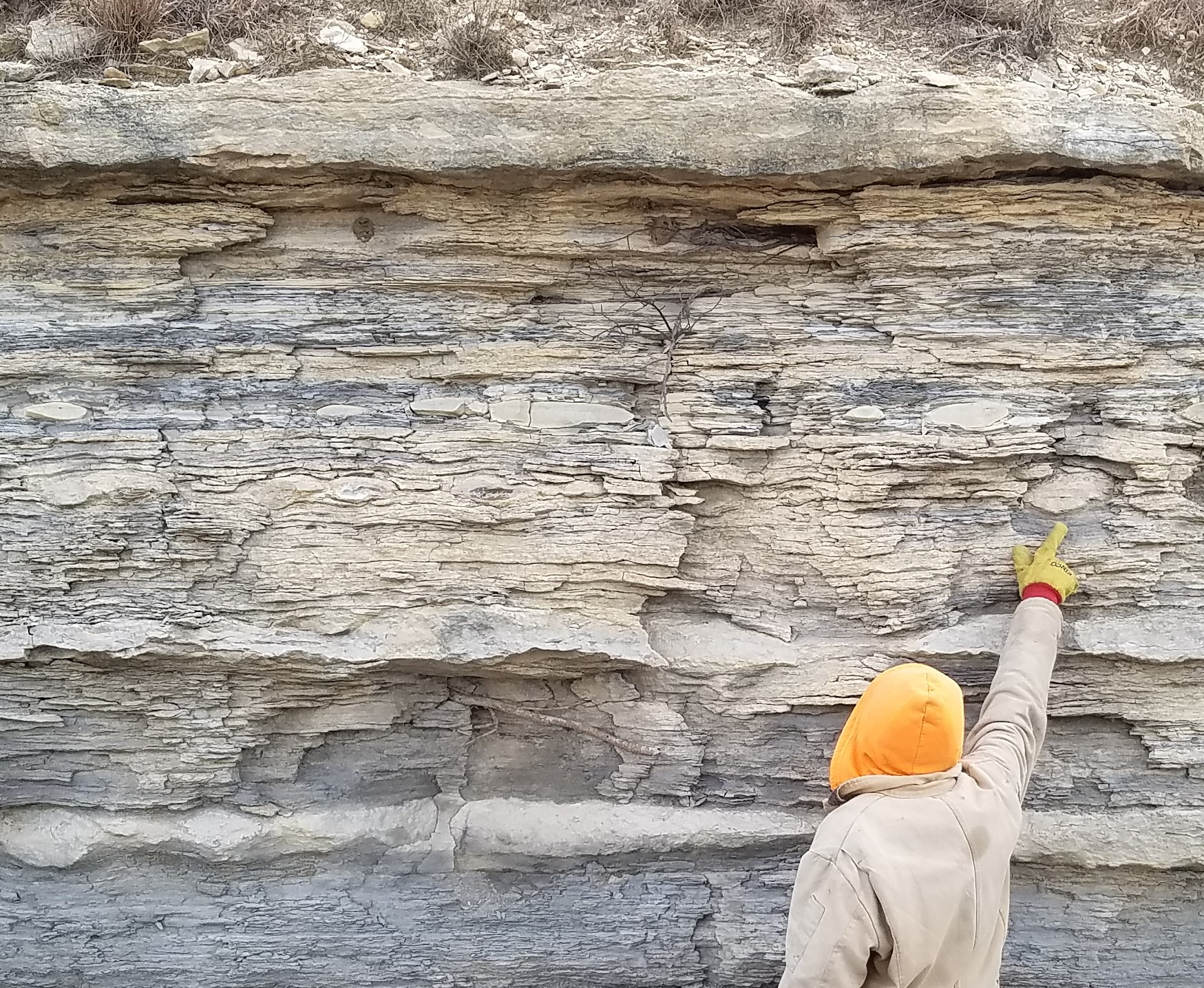
Lighter, thicker Shellrock bed over the darker shales of the Jetmore

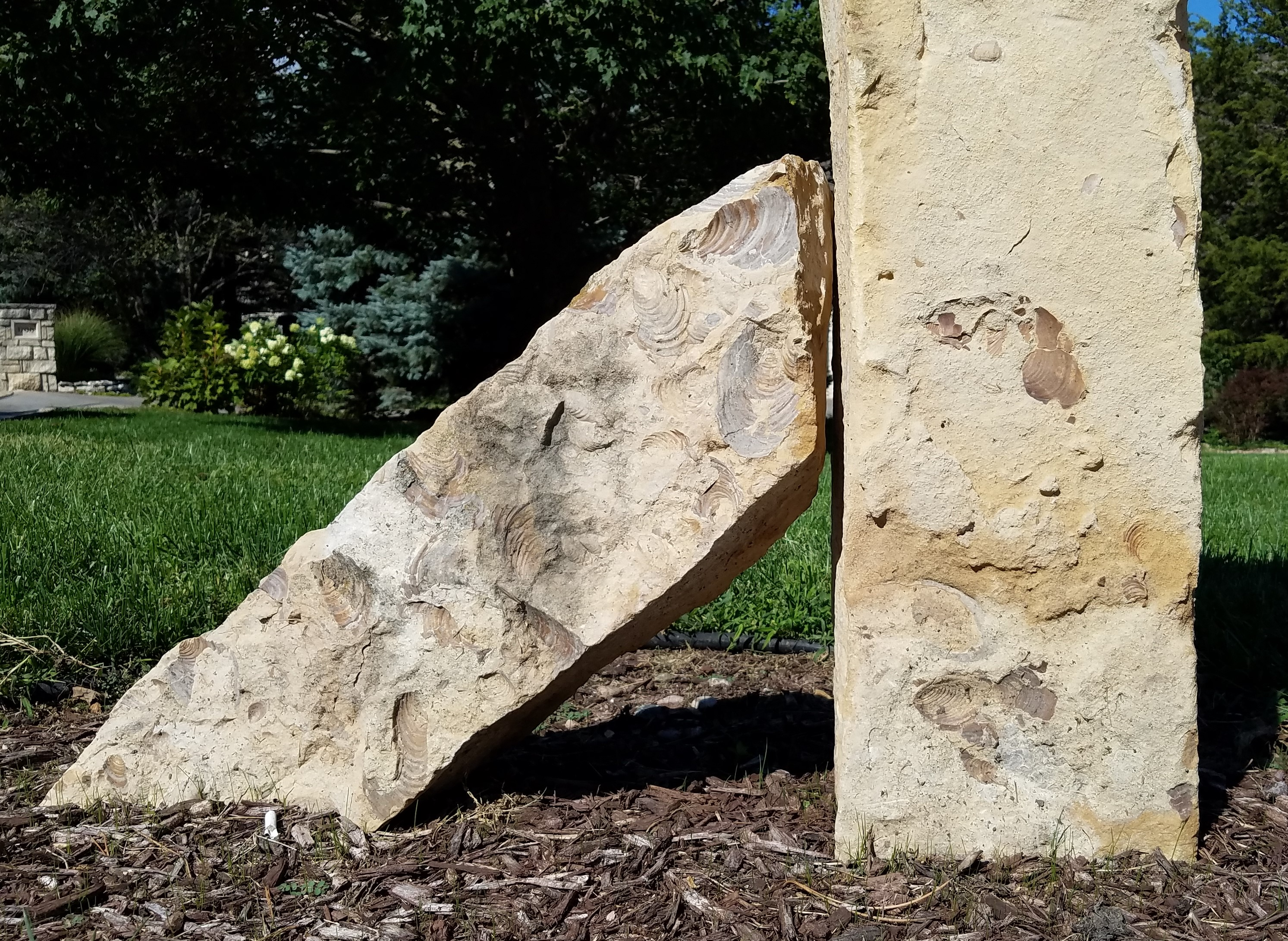
Shellrock bed leaner: many shells Fencepost bed post: fewer shells

- The Shellrock bed of the Jetmore Limestone member (marker bed J-13, 17–20 feet (5.2–6.1 m) below the Fencepost) is broadly similar to the Fencepost; and of the other limestone bed in these units, it is the most frequently used unit after the Fencepost, both for fence posts and for building. It is distinguished by being generally a little thicker than the Fencepost but mostly by having many, many more Inoceramus labiatus shells. It also tends to form a ledge or terrace below that made by the Fencepost. In posts and buildings, the Shellrock is light grey to white and lacks limonite staining. The Shellrock also has many parting lines and tends to spall, and the slopes below its outcrop are heavily littered by spalled I. labiatus fossils.

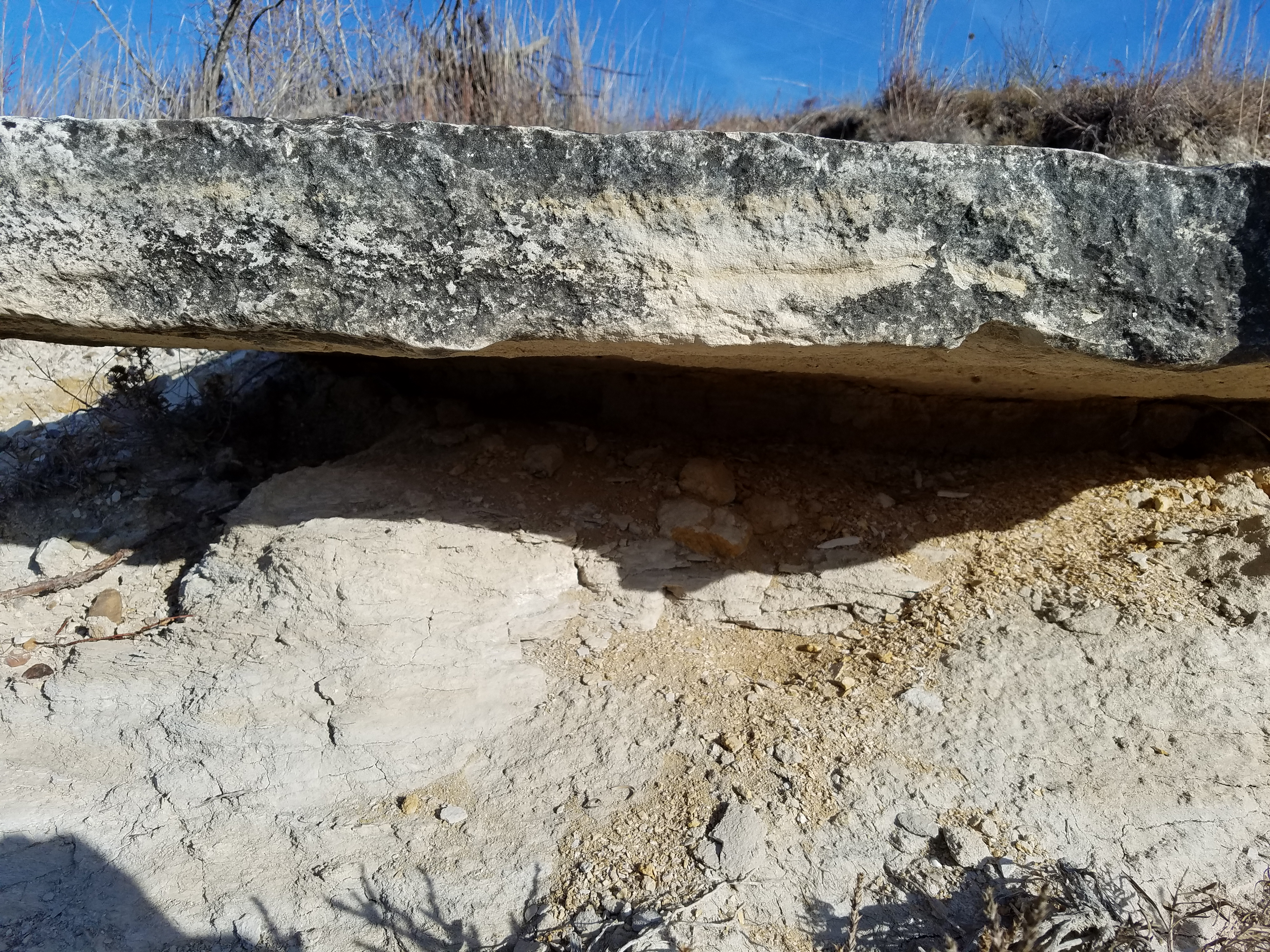
The little Fairport limestone (F-2) above the Fencepost.

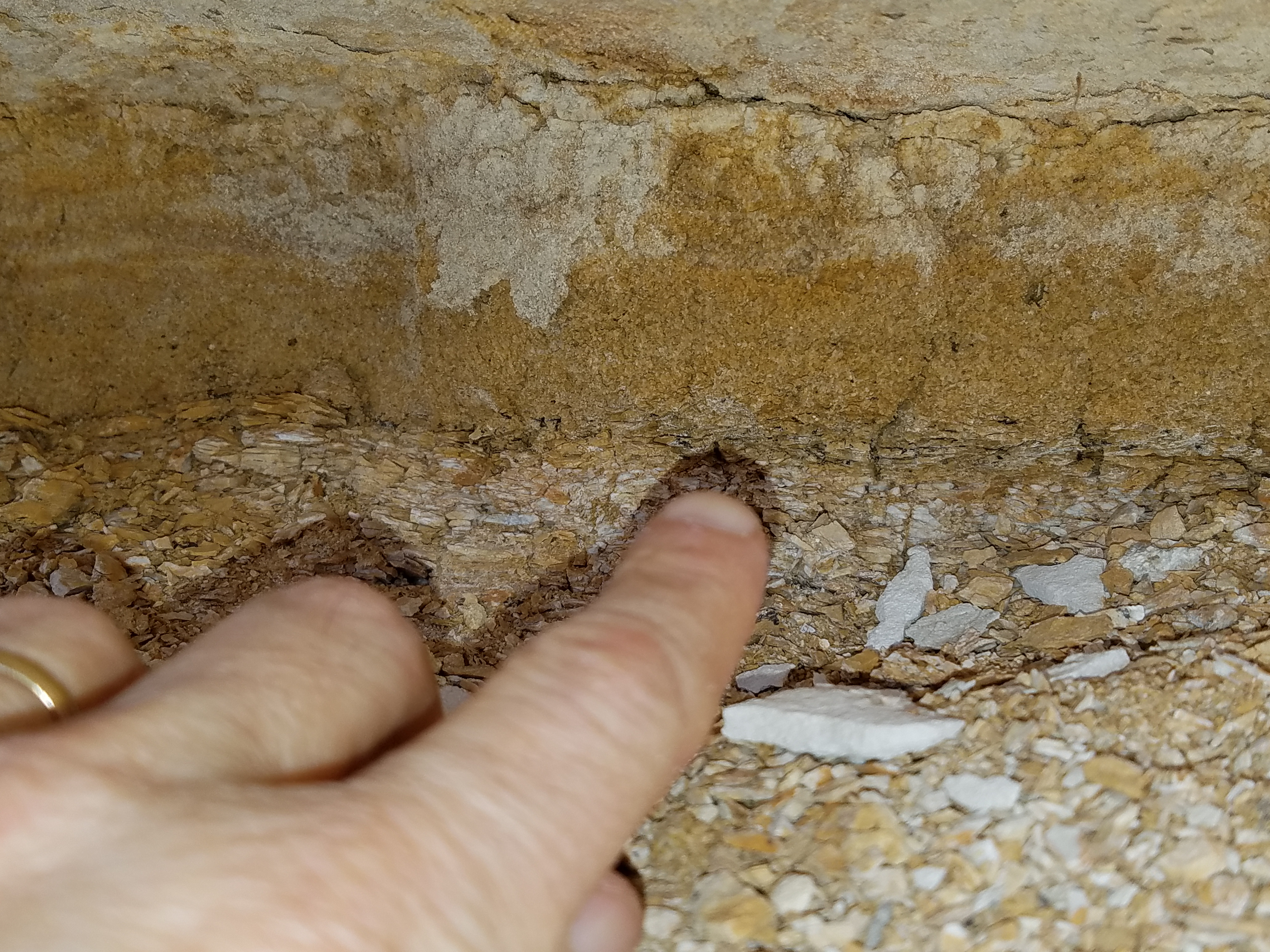
The bentonite bed (F-1) just under the little limestone above the Fencepost.

- The "limestone above the Fencepost" (marker bed F-2, about 4 feet (1.2 m) above the Fencepost) appears in coloration and hardness to be a thinner version of the Fencepost. Like the Fencepost, it has sufficient toughening calcite to be classified as a limestone. On weathering, it does not become as orange as the higher, marly chalks. In place of I. labiatus, the main distinguishing macrofossils are slender, calcite-filled belemnites. In the field, this limestone lies in contact with the 2 inches (5.1 cm) thick F-1 bentonite marker bed. In construction, generally as tough as the Fencepost stone, this limestone was used for brick, flagging, or coping. To expose an area of the Fencepost limestone for quarrying, a nearly equal area of F-2 must first be exposed and quarried off. The Jewell County Jail illustrates an unusual exploitation of this situation; courses of Fencepost limestone alternate with courses of different half-height limestone of which the F-2 is a local source.

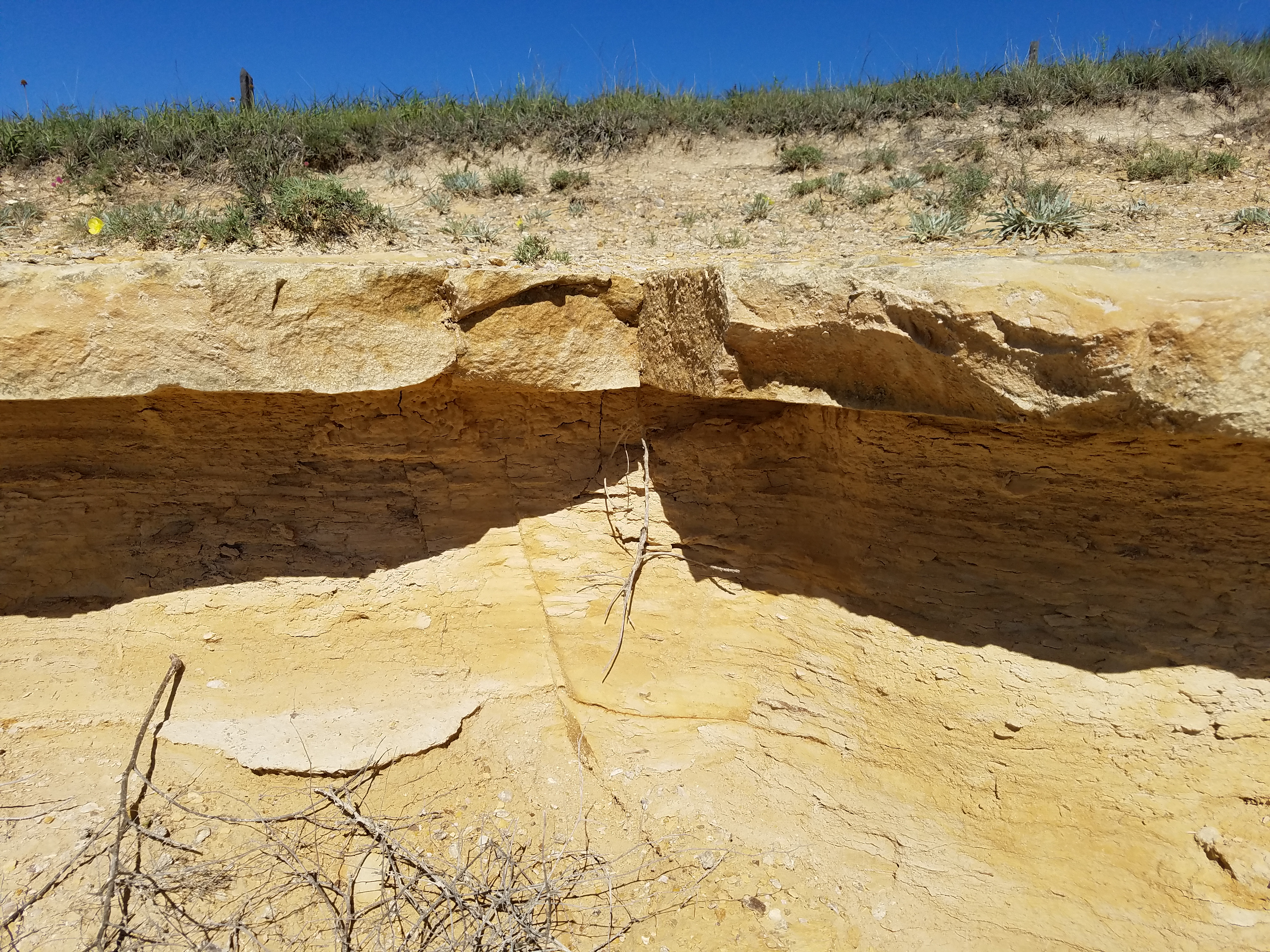
The Fairport marker F-3 limestone 17 feet (5.2 m) above the Fencepost

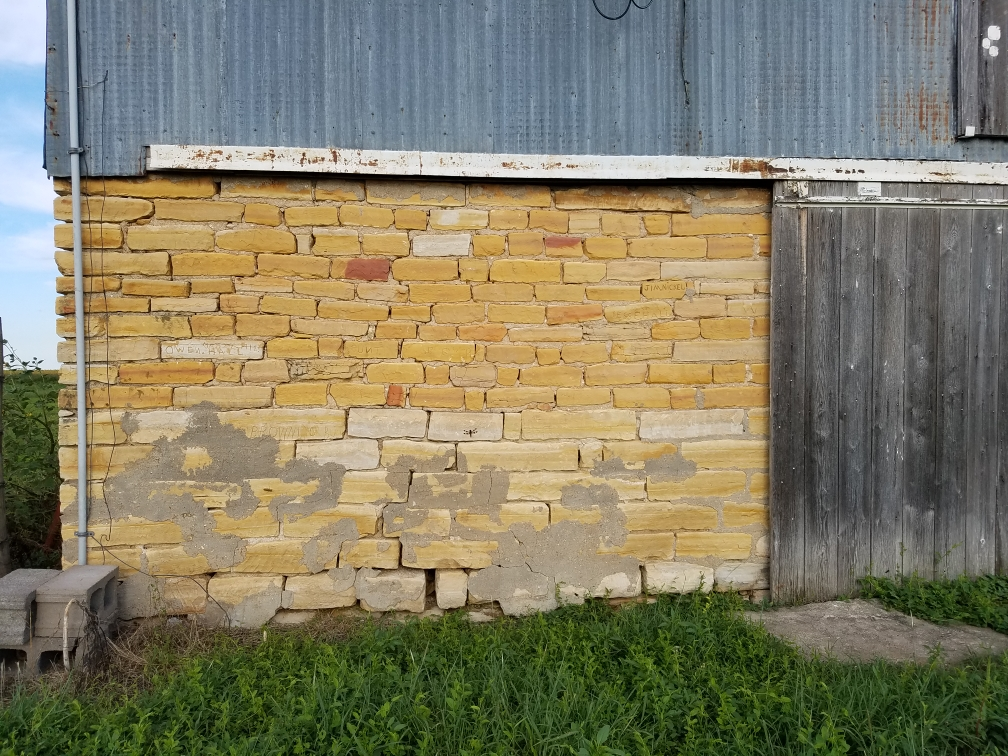
Lower courses are Fencepost; upper courses are orange Fairport marker F-3

- The third Fairport marker bed (marker bed F-3, about 17 feet (5.2 m) above the Fencepost) is a limestone that can also be distinctly noticeable and form the highest actual edge of the bluff, higher and set back from the actual Fencepost outcrop. In the field and in construction, it is thinner and somewhat less durable, is missing mollusk shells, and has a more uniform yellow-orange coloration rather than streaks.

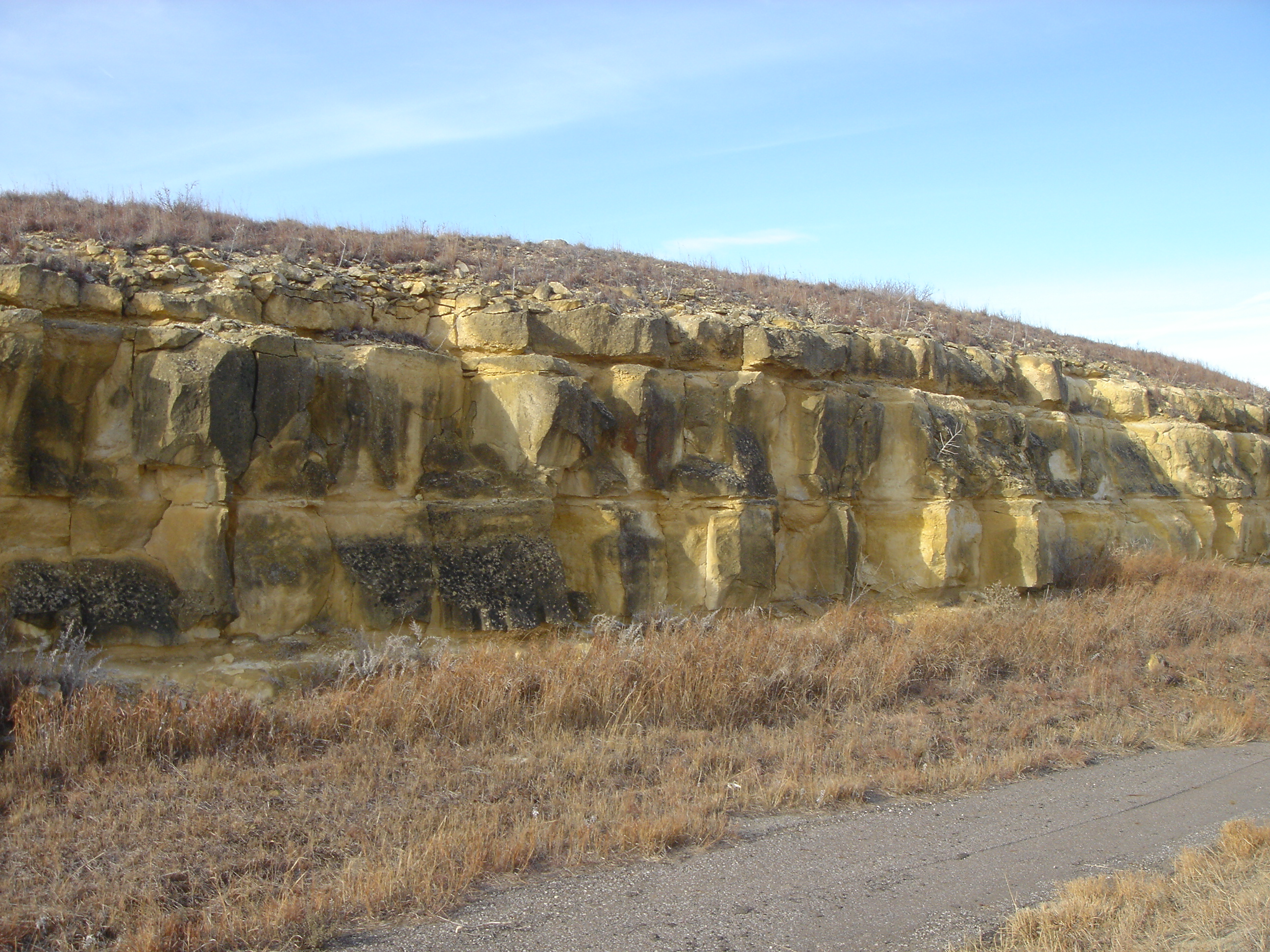
Fort Hays Limestone in the K-147 road cut at the Cedar Bluff State Park

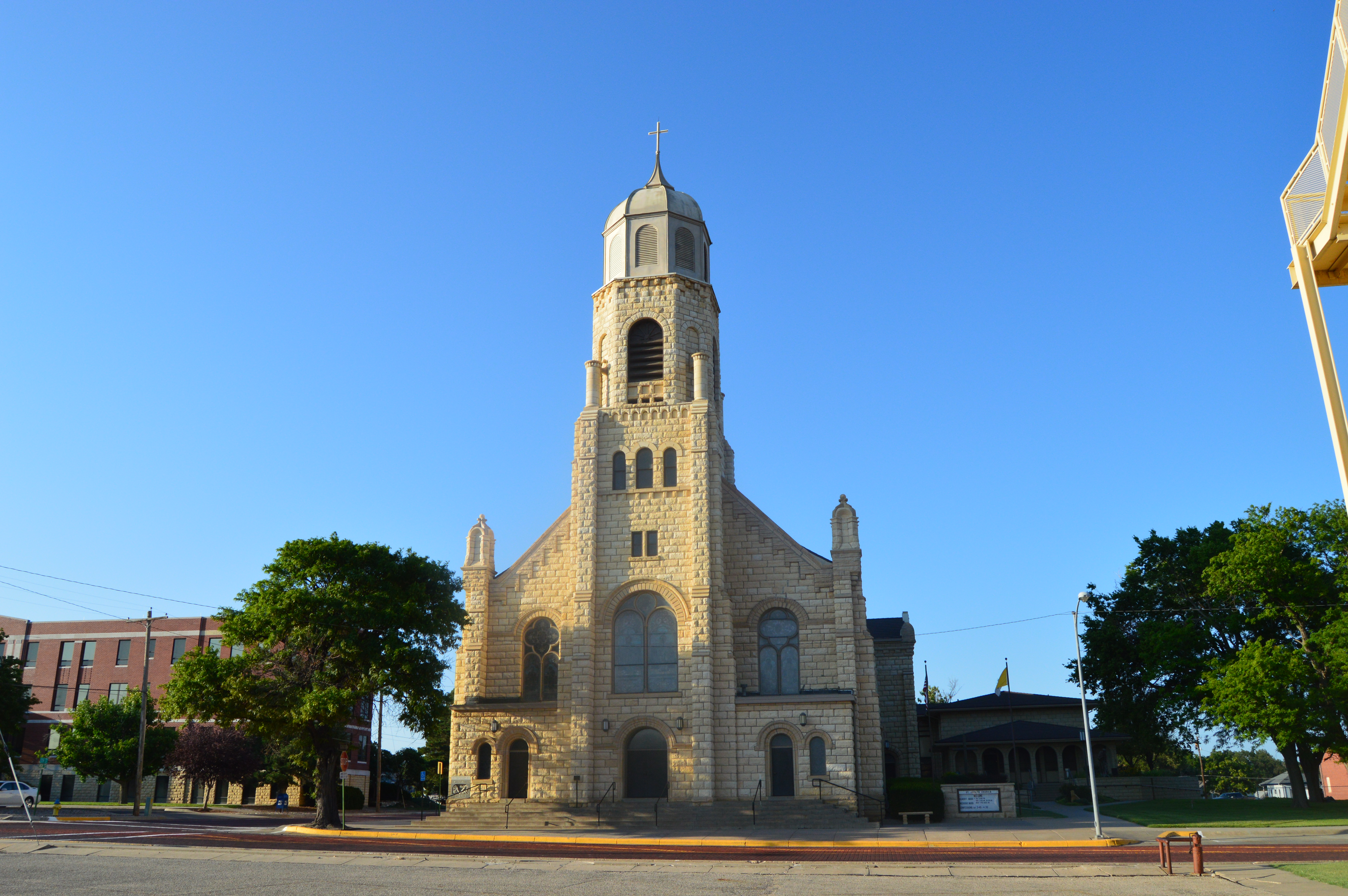
St Joseph's Church, Fort Hays lm. facing, Fencepost lm. foundation and trim

- There is a practical association between the Fort Hays Limestone and the thin Fencepost bed. The Fort Hays Limestone is "perhaps the most conspicuous physiographic boundary in Kansas." The outcrop of the Fencepost limestone bluffs invariably lies 5–40 miles south or east of the Fort Hays limestone bluffs. The Fort Hays Limestone has been used in buildings. It was also used somewhat for fenceposts. However, when put in contact with the soil, it absorbs considerable moisture causing it to break apart in winter freezes. On the other hand, the Fencepost has remarkable durability when set in the ground, and was used for foundations. Particularly, certain churches in Ellis and Hays have been faced with blocks of Fort Hays Limestone, but have foundations built from Fencepost limestone.

== Access and viewing ==
Stone Post Country features numerous stone outcrops, historical fences, and buildings that can be accessed by automobile tours.

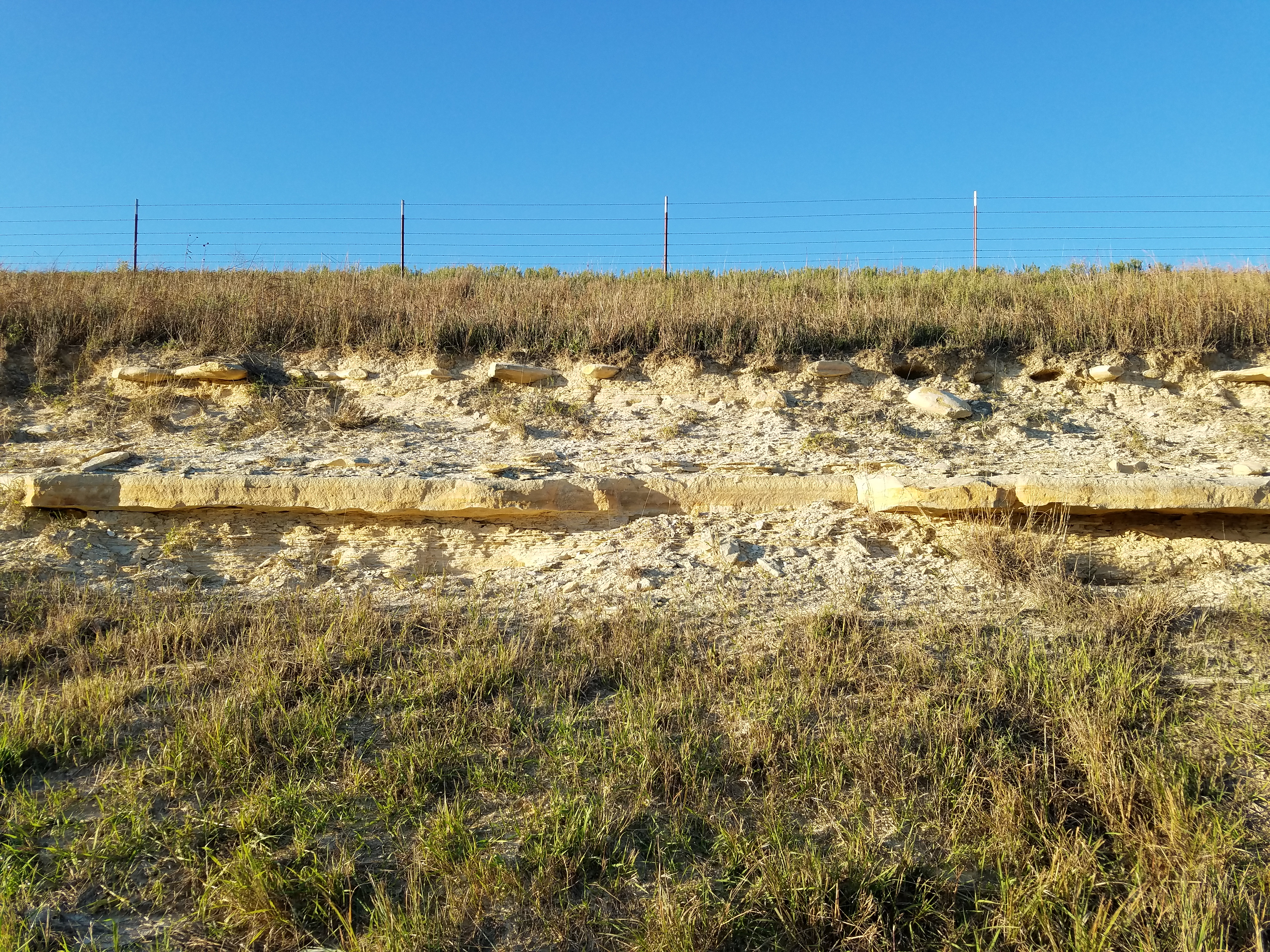
Fencepost limestone outcrop in a road cut on the frontage road.

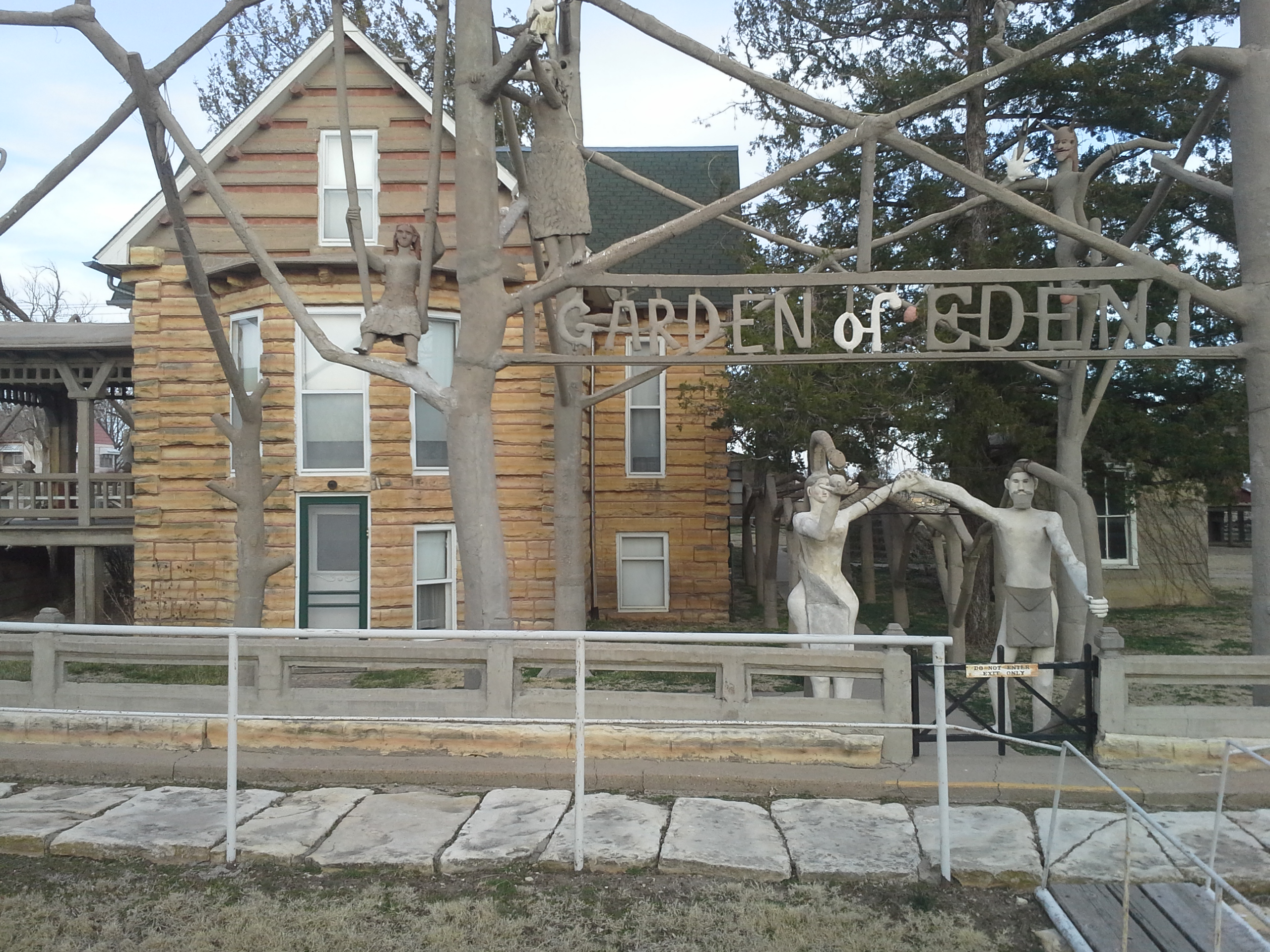
S. P. Dinsmoor's Cabin Home, a cabin of Fencepost limestone logs

=== Interstate 70 ===
Interstate 70 passes right across the center of Post Rock Country. The stone posts are seen in the countryside some 20 miles (32 km) west of Salina as this highway enters the scenic Dakota Escarpment, now topped by the Smoky Hills Wind Project. Sights of stone fenceposts and stone buildings constructed of the Fencepost limestone are common from there westward some 70 miles to just past Hays. Side trips can be made into numerous Post Rock communities. From mile 223 to mile 195, among the wind turbines, the Interstate threads the level of the Fencepost outcrop. Between Exit 221 (Lucas) and Exit 219 (Ellsworth), Avenue B is a frontage road with exposures of Fencepost limestone. The thin bentonite marker can be seen below the Stone Post bed here. Fragments of Inoceramus labiatus, Inoceramus cuvieri, Collignoniceras woollgari, and Baculites yokoyamai can be seen. Please do not collect from this exposed public location.

=== Post Rock Scenic Byway ===
The Post Rock Scenic Byway passes between the Post Rock communities of Wilson and Lucas. From Wilson, the highway rises to the Fencepost outcrops, then drops down into the colorful Dakota Hills south of the lake. Crossing the dam, the views include the Fencepost bluffs of the Blue Hills lining the Saline Valley.

Now featuring a folk art community, Lucas is also long known as the location of Samuel P. Dinsmoor's Cabin Home and Garden of Eden statuary garden. Rather than the conventional stone block masonry courses, Dinsmoor envisioned constructing homes with "logs" cut from the Fencepost bed, carved to lock together in the fashion of the logs in a log cabin.

=== U.S. 183 ===
U.S. Highway 183 interchanges with Interstate 70 at Hays. Several public buildings, churches, and university buildings in Hays are constructed of Fencepost limestone.

Highway 183 passes no Fencepost limestone north of Hays as there it enters the Fort Hays Limestone region. However, south of Hays, the highway passes the small Post Rock communities of Schoenchen, Liebenthal, and La Crosse. Near Schoenchen, the stone posts were cut from long quarries that followed the bluff along the north of the river. On the plain between the Smoky Hill River and Liebenthal, the Fencepost bed is shallow, and can be seen outcropping in draws along the highway.

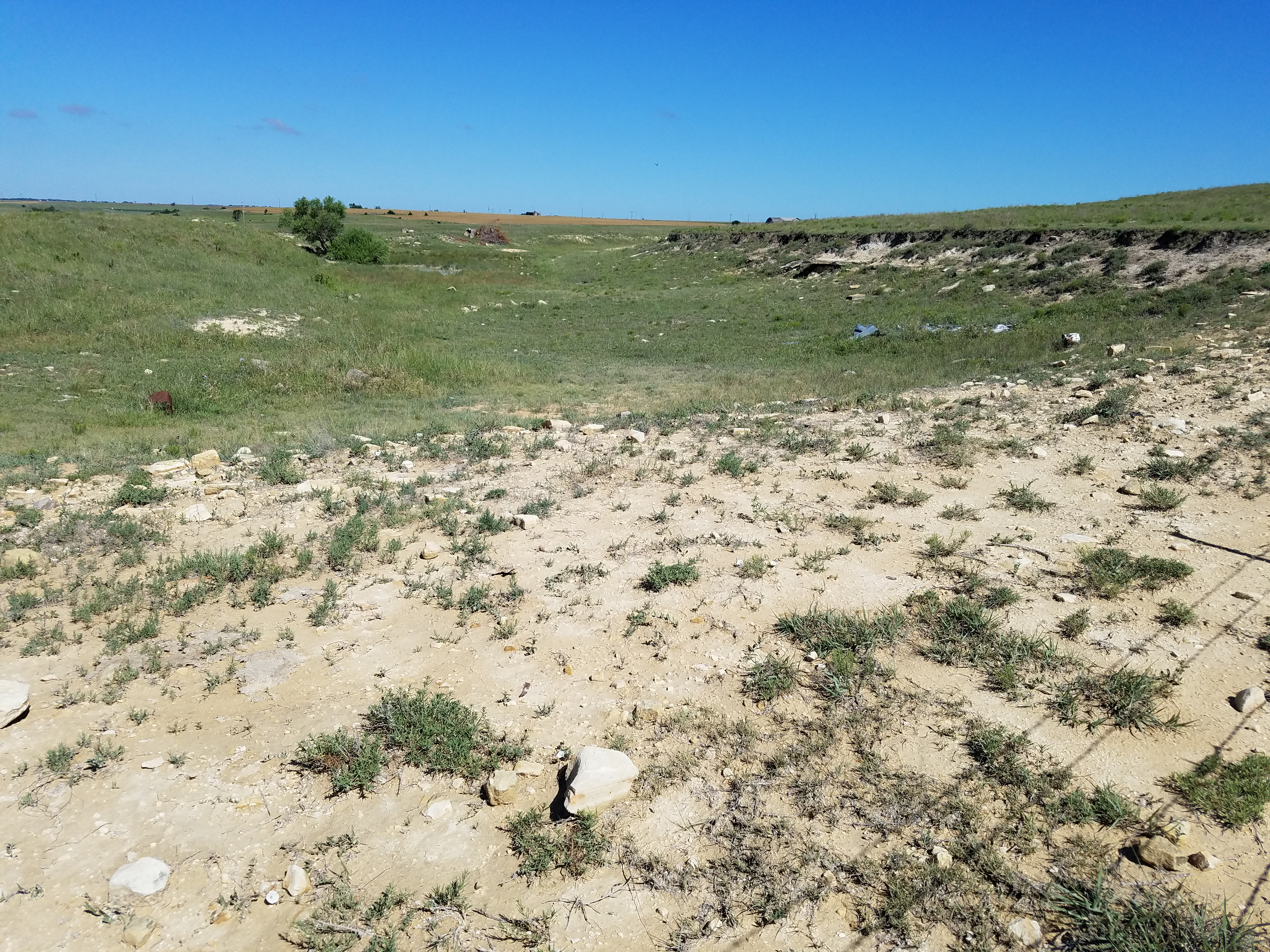
Abandoned fencepost quarry, south of Hays, about 0.4 miles north of the Smoky Hill River on U.S. 183

==== Quarry site ====
U.S. 183 cuts south through an abandoned Fencepost quarry as it approaches the Smoky Hill River bridge near Schoenchen. Just uphill from the quarry, limestone and shale of the Fairport Shale are exposed in the road cut. Facing west from the highway, the quarry is south of the red utility warning signs. The Fencepost makes a poor exposure next to the highway here, mostly having been quarried off of the bluff. At the depth where it would be found in the road cut, it mostly buried. A resistant marker bed of the Fairport Chalk (F-3) is seen a short distance up the hill, and from the erosion of the shale, this limestone seems to have drawn a lot of attention in the years since this section of U.S. 183 was widened in 1966. On private property, the quarry can be viewed from the fence line along the road cut. A limestone shelf is seen jutting from the old face of the quarry; but, this is not the Fencepost, which would be a bit below the level of the floor under the hillside. This visible limestone is the "limestone above the Fencepost" (Fairport Chalk marker F-2). This limestone is about half as thick as the Fencepost, and can tend to split at a limonite seam; otherwise, it is nearly as durable as the Fencepost and similar in color, and so was used as flagging.

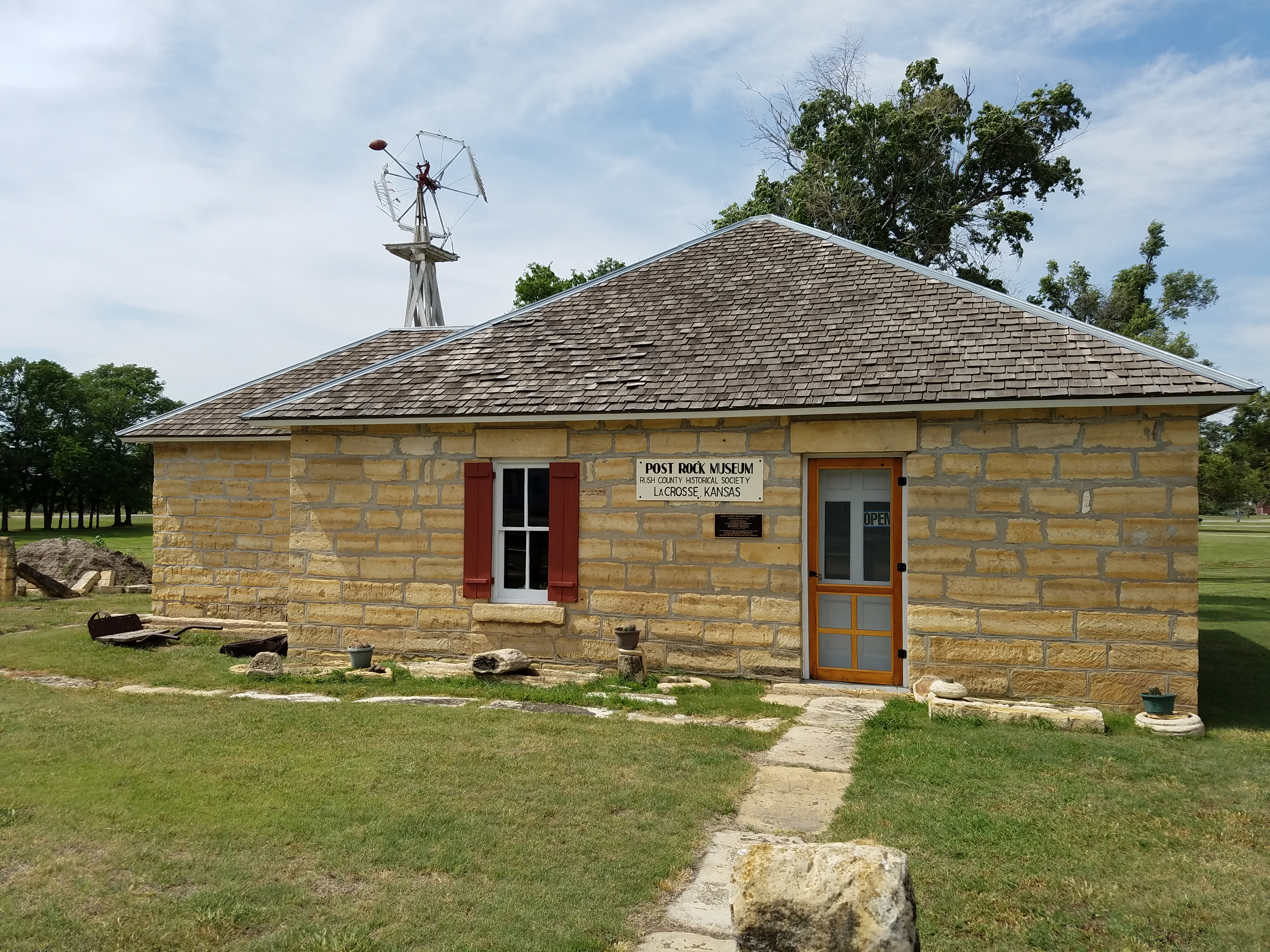
Post Rock Museum (La Crosse, Kansas)

==== Museum ====
The Post Rock Museum is located on the south end of La Crosse. Examples of Post Rock populate the park that this museum shares with the Rush County Historical Museum (occupying the relocated Timken train station), the Nekoma Bank Museum, and the Kansas Barbed Wire Museum. The Post Rock Museum contains a recreated stone post quarry, assorted quarrying tools used in the area, and a fossil collection.

=== Operating Stone Post Quarries ===
Vonada Farms and Stone Company is located 6.5 miles (10.5 km) north of Sylvan Grove, Kansas. Tours can be arranged, see the Kansas Sampler Foundation pages.

Bluestem Quarry and Stoneworks operates near Lucas, Kansas.

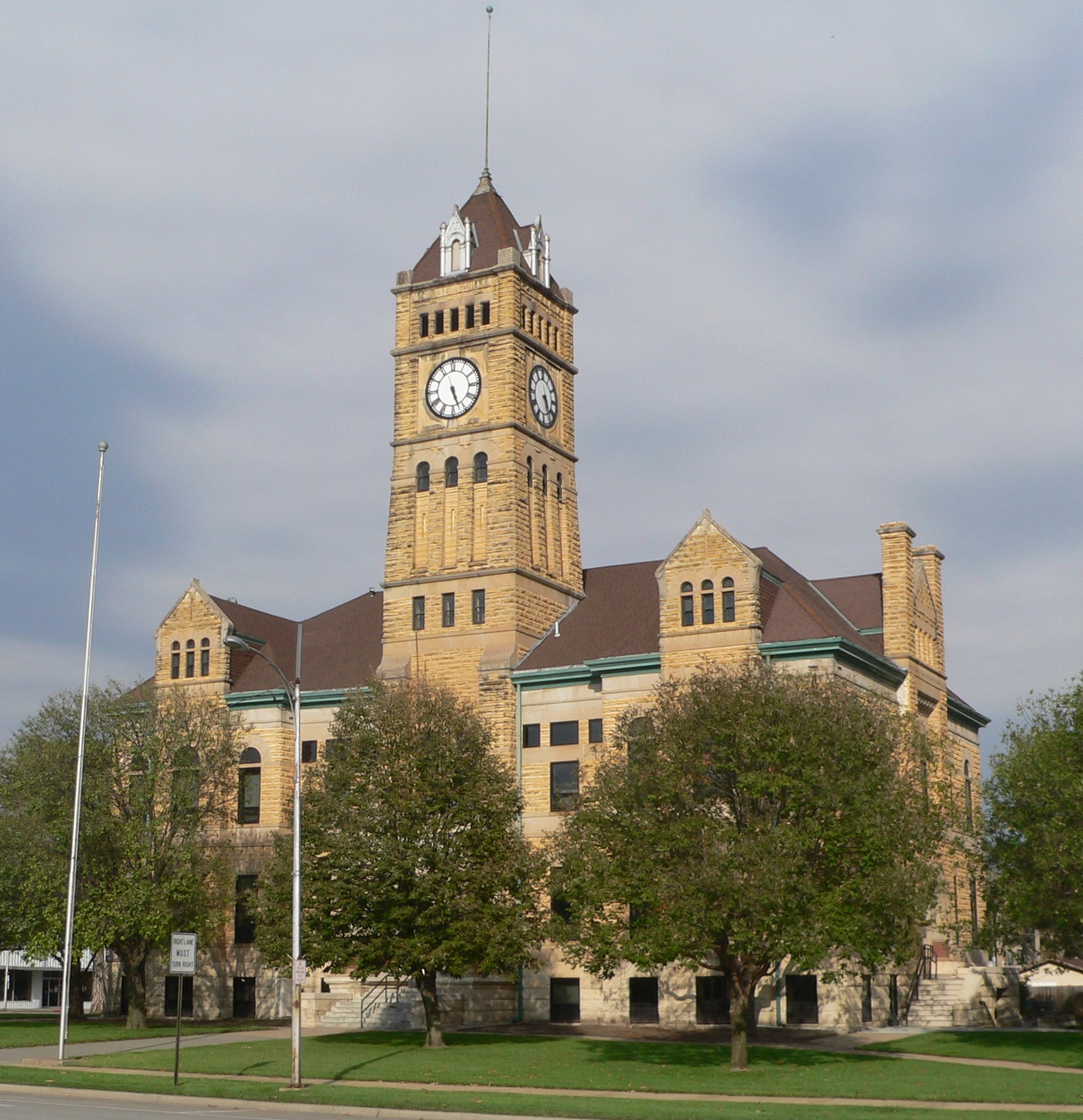
Mitchell County courthouse, Beloit

=== Other communities ===
Other communities with abundant Fencepost limestone architecture:

• Beloit • Burr Oak • Hunter • Jamestown • Jetmore • Lincoln • Paradise • Pfeifer • Randall • Sylvan Grove • Victoria • Walker

Fencepost limestone/Dakota sandstone boundary communities:

• Concordia • Ellsworth

== Gallery ==
See also Commons:Category:Fencepost limestone buildings in Kansas

Additional Fencepost Limestone Constructions of Kansas
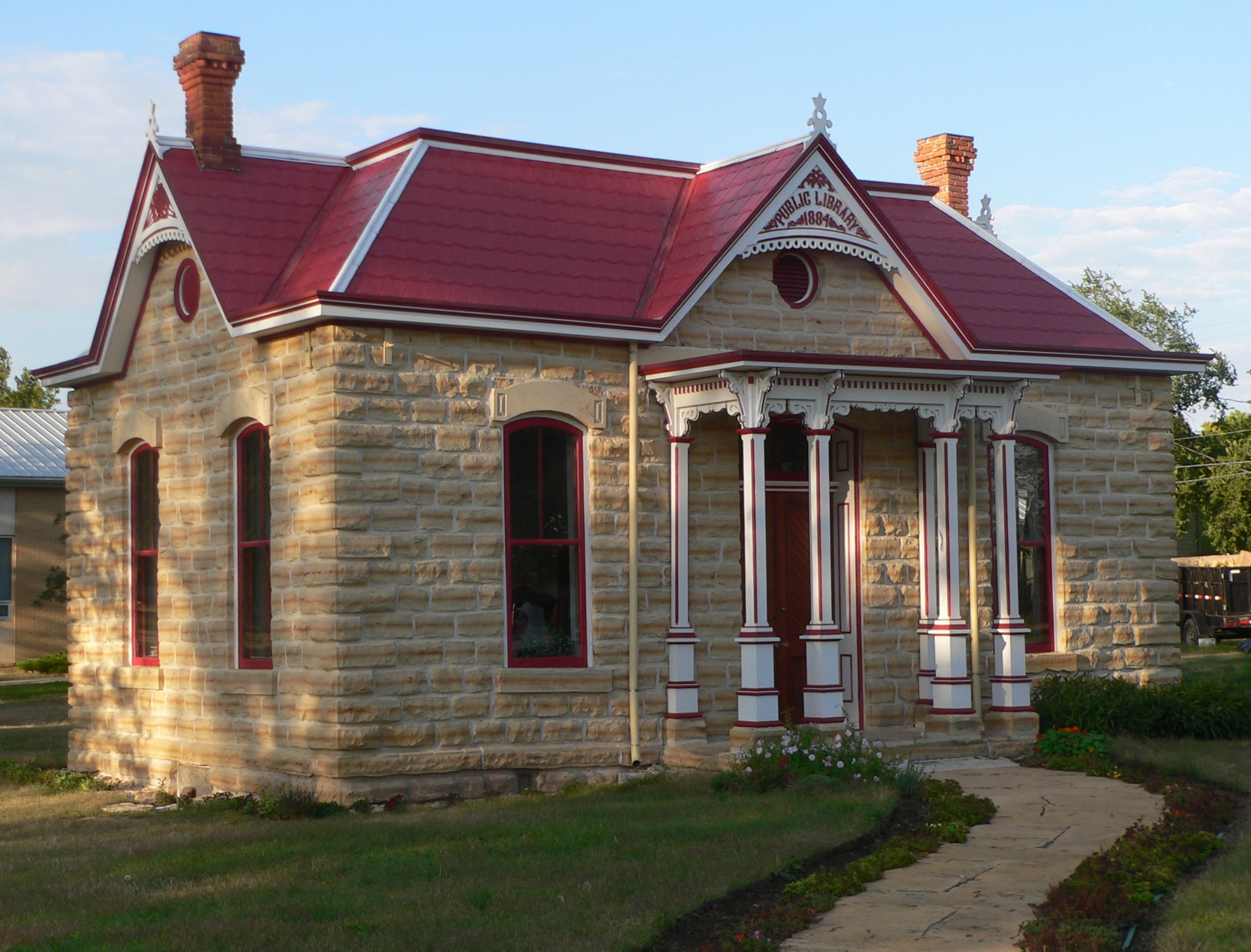
Cawker City Old Public Library/Museum

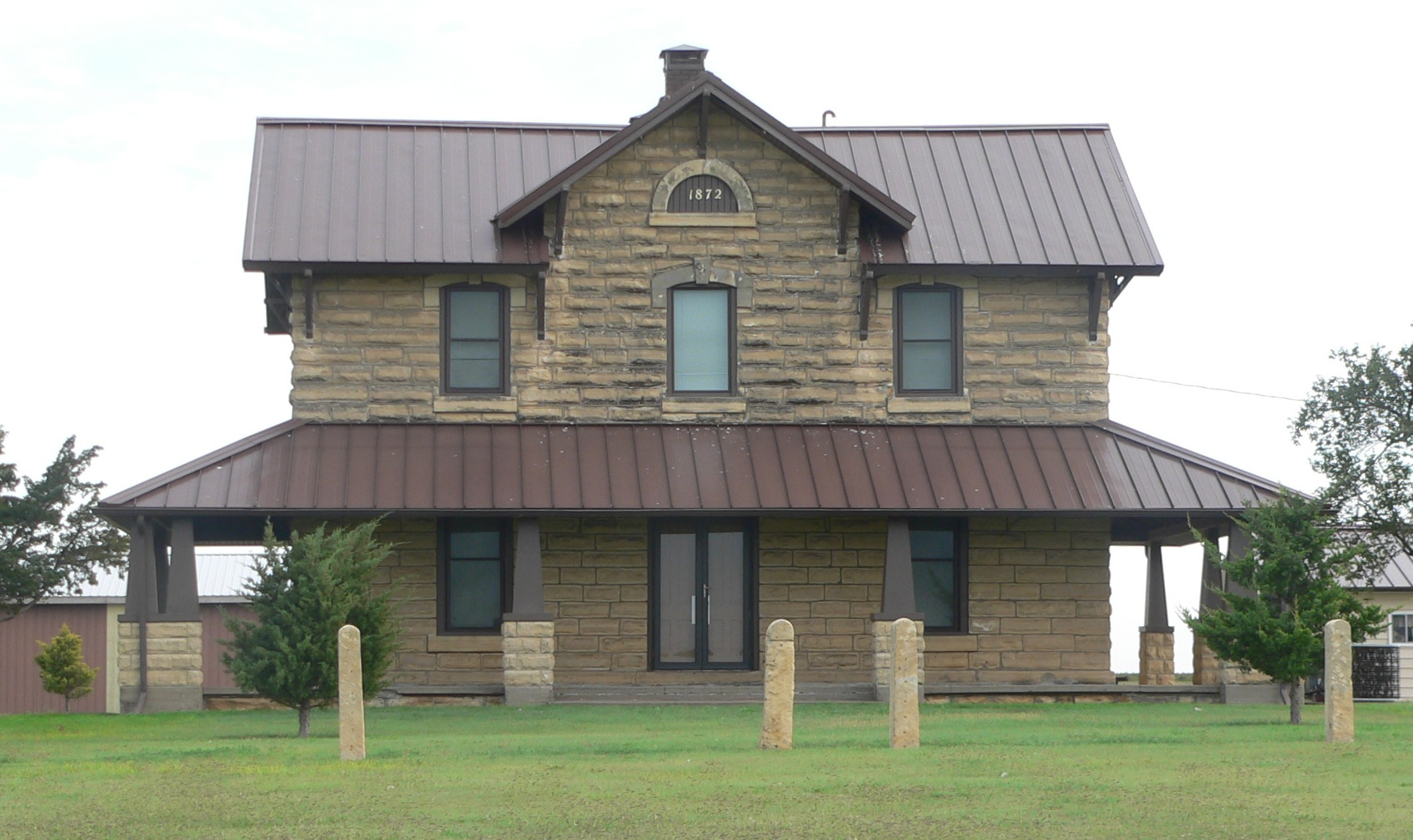
Grants Villa
Ellis County

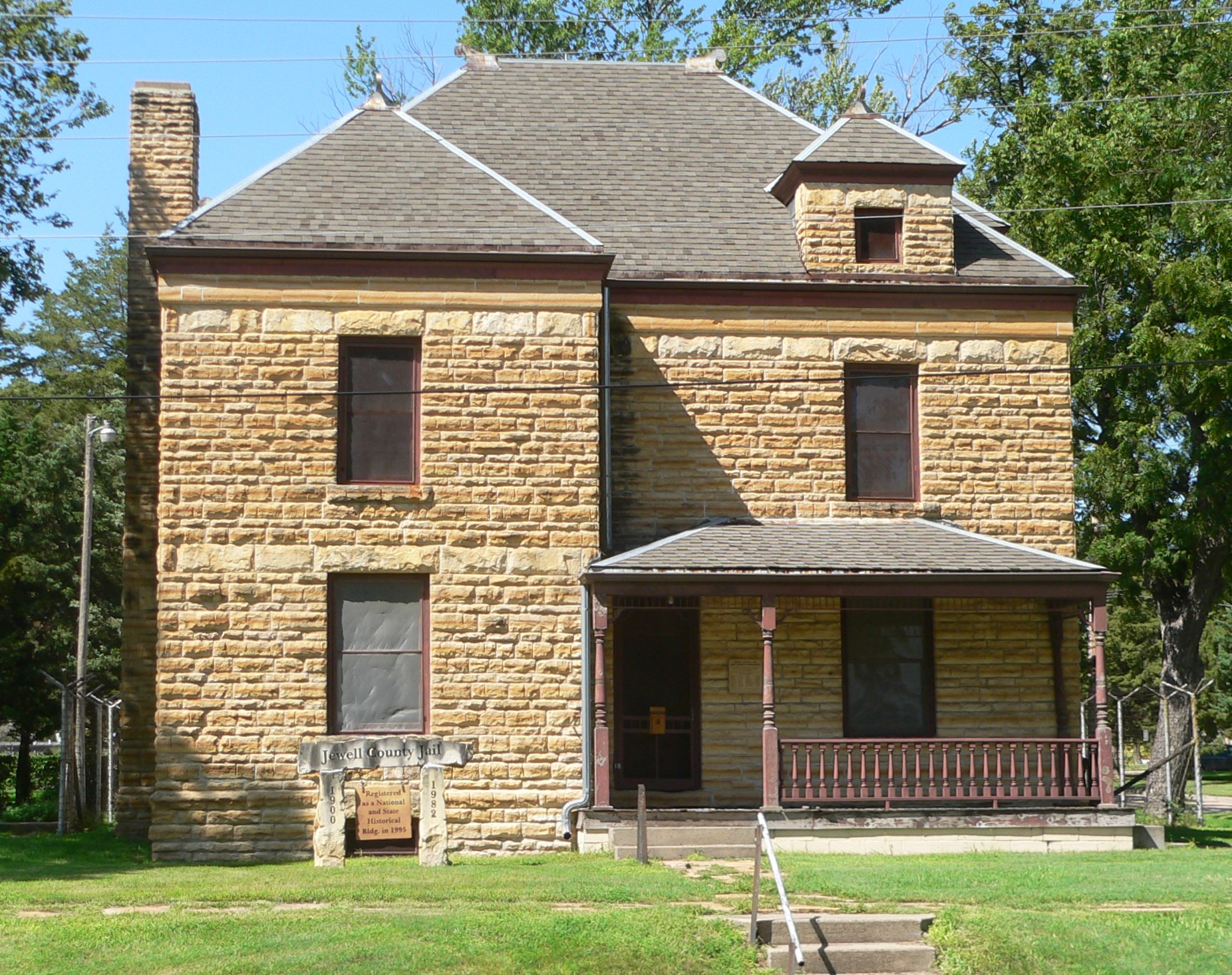
Jewell County jail
Mankato

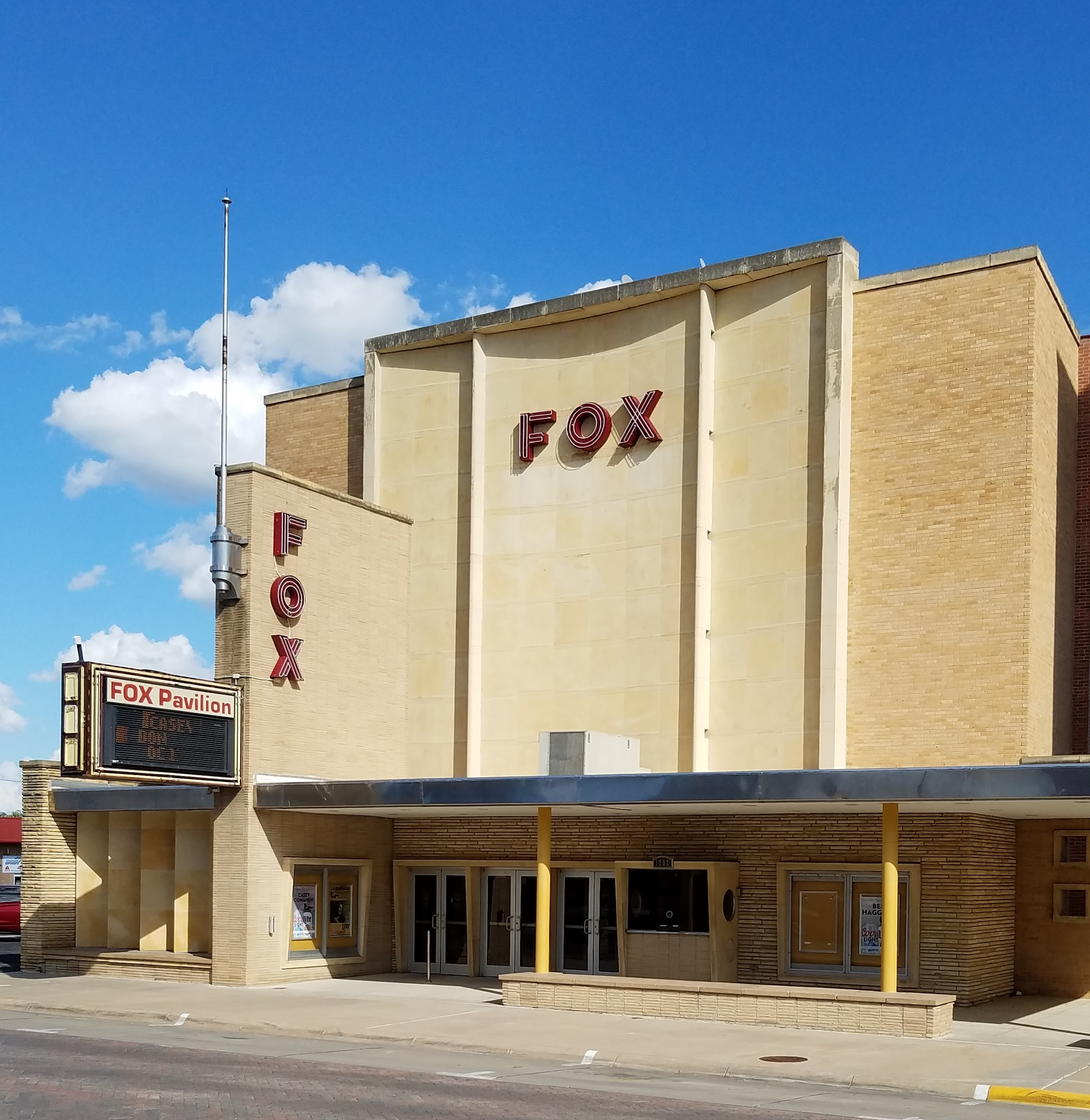
Fox Theater Pavilion, Hays

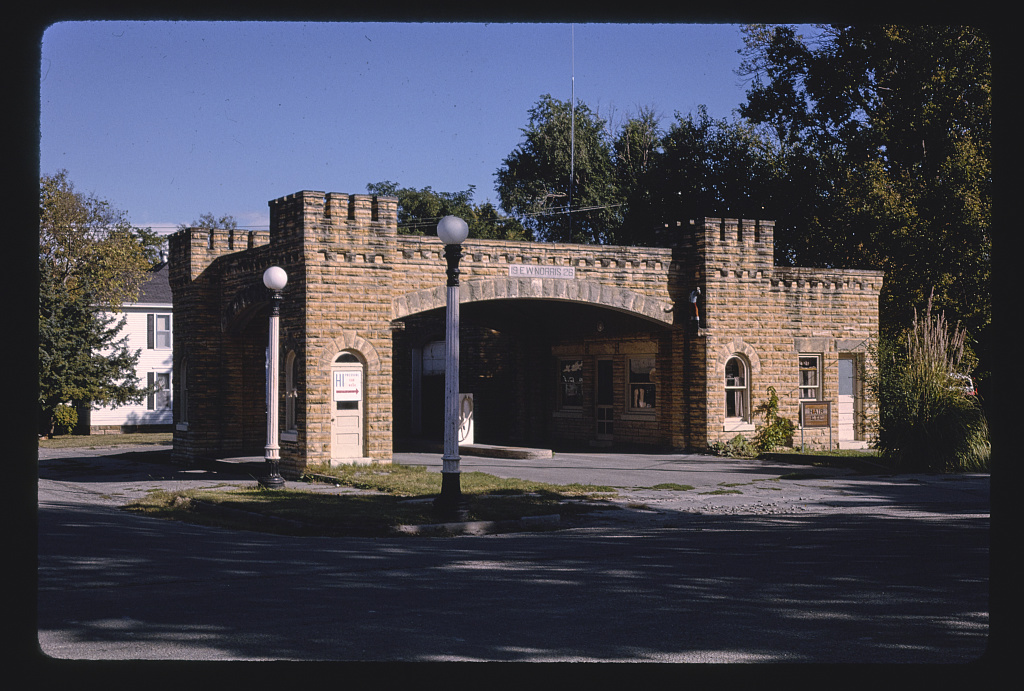
E. W. Norris Service Station – Castle Lodge
(Glen Elder)

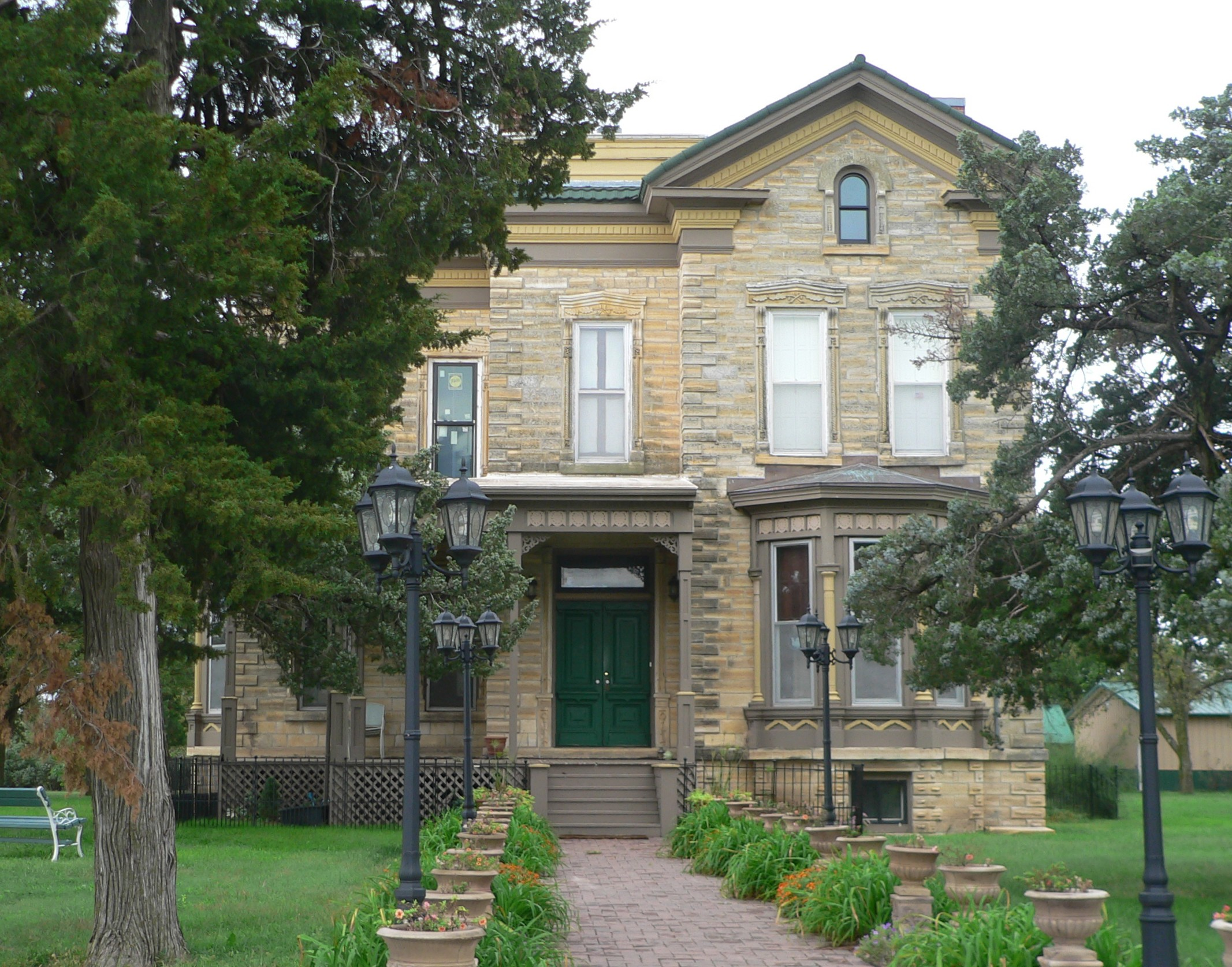
Arthur Larkin House
Ellsworth

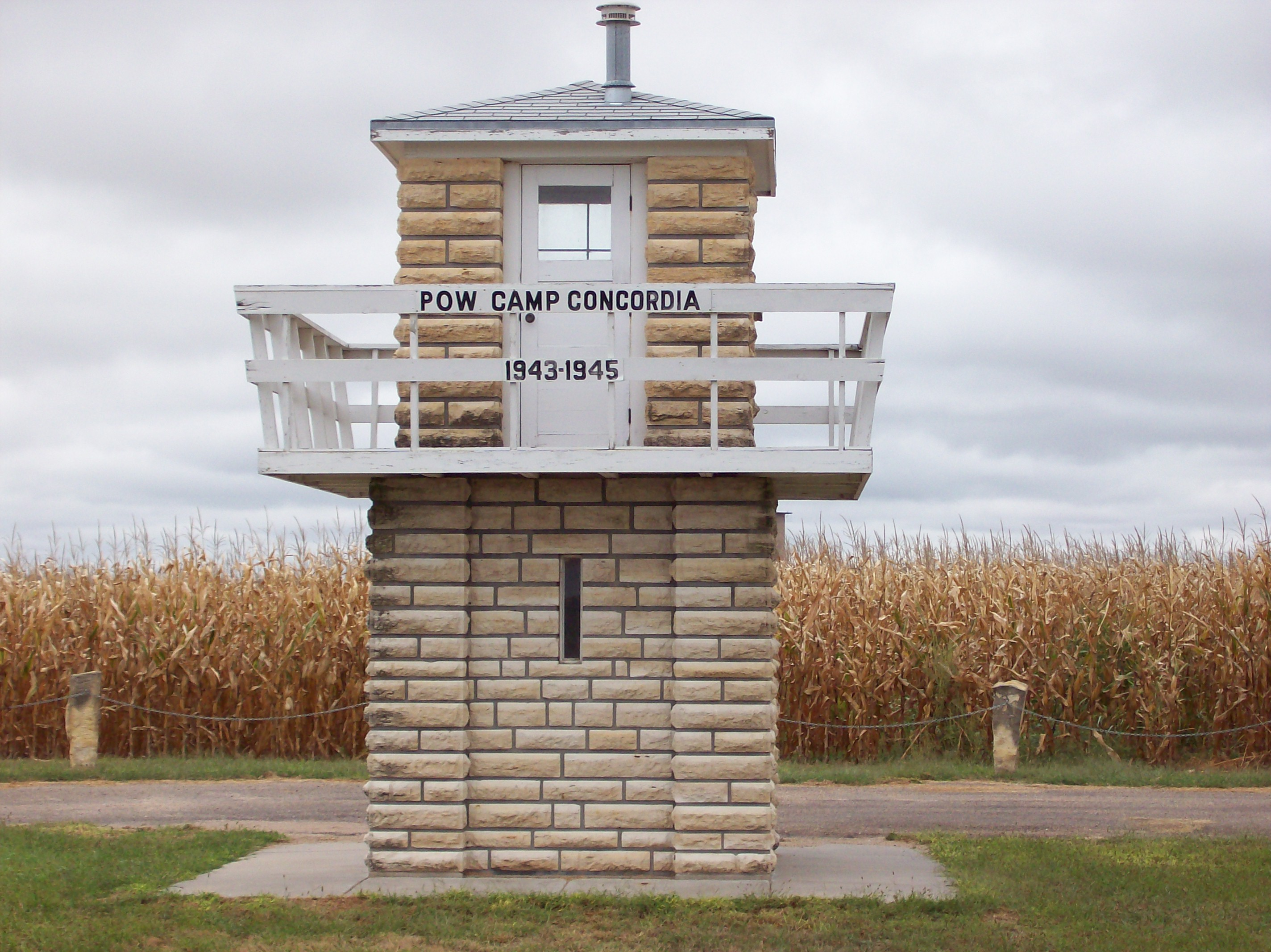
Restored POW Camp Concordia Guard Tower

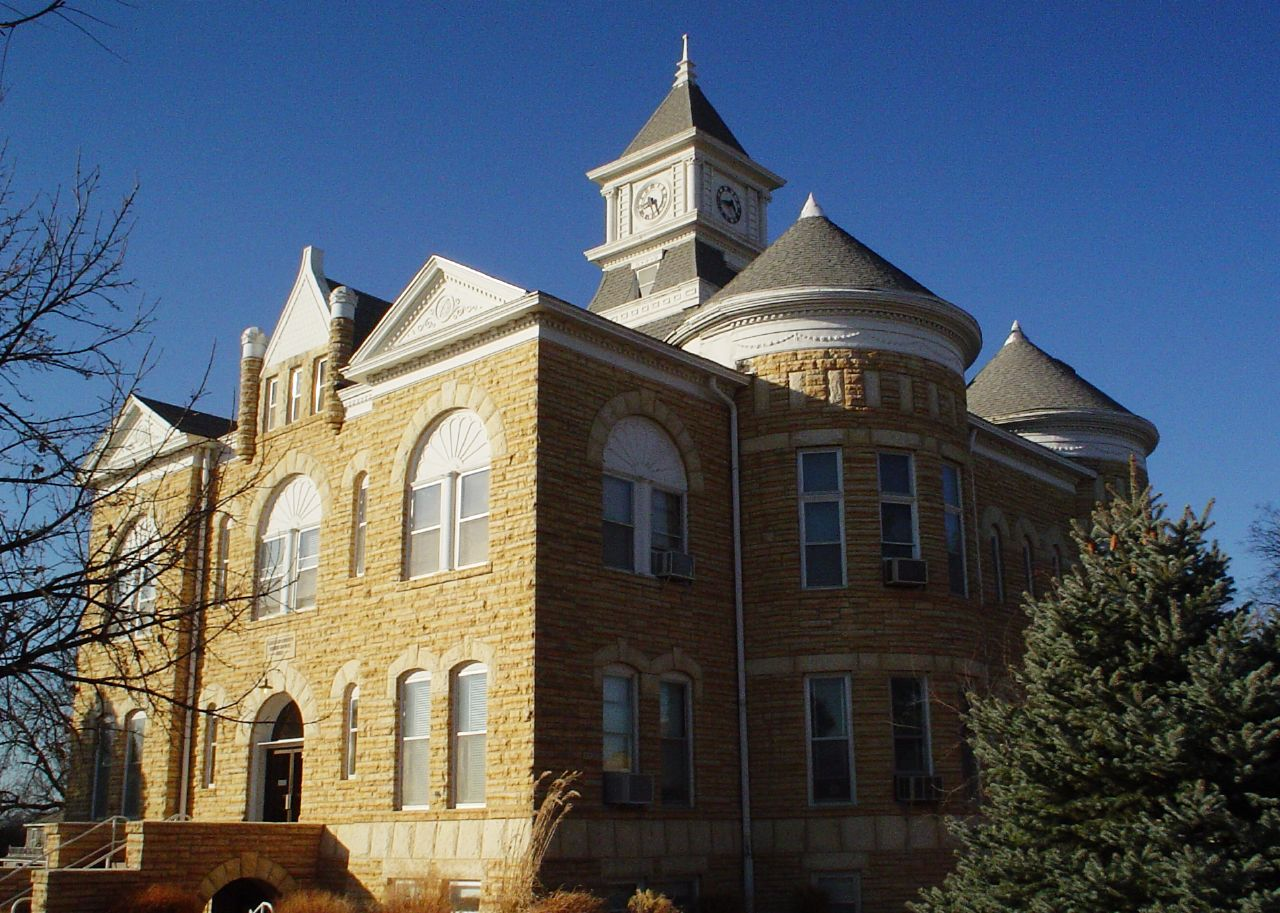
Lincoln County courthouse
(Lincoln)

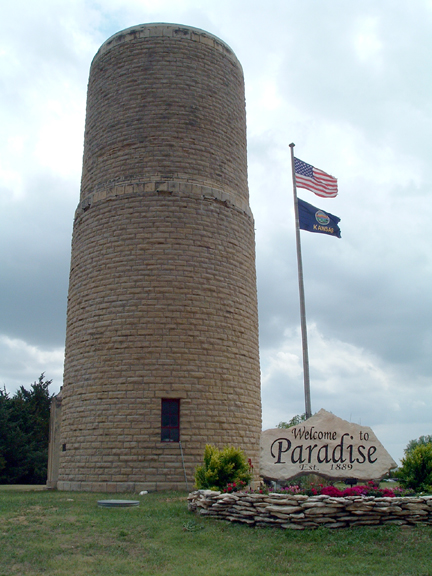
Paradise Water Tower, 1938
(Paradise)

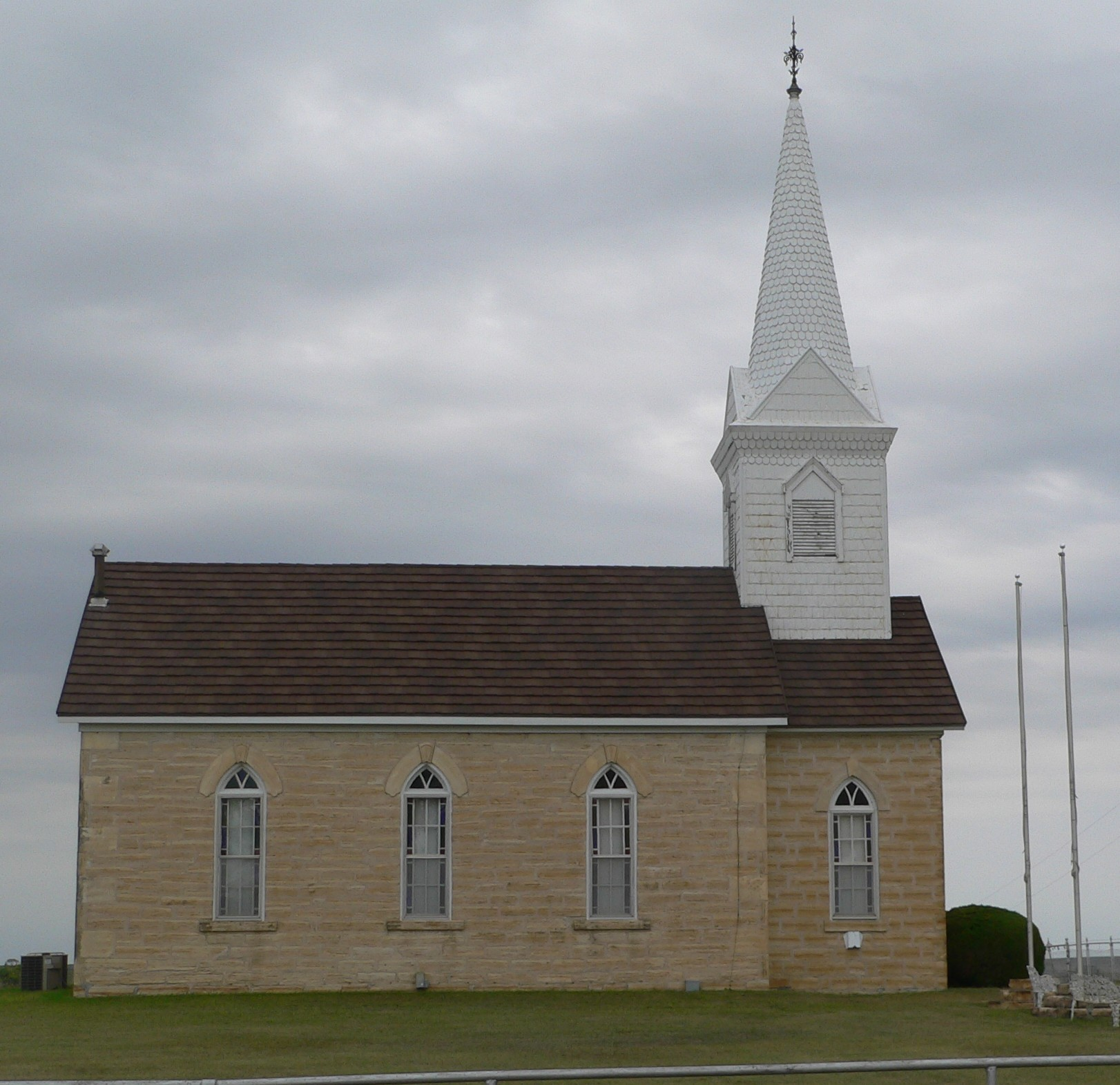
Danske Evangelist Lutheran Kirke
Denmark

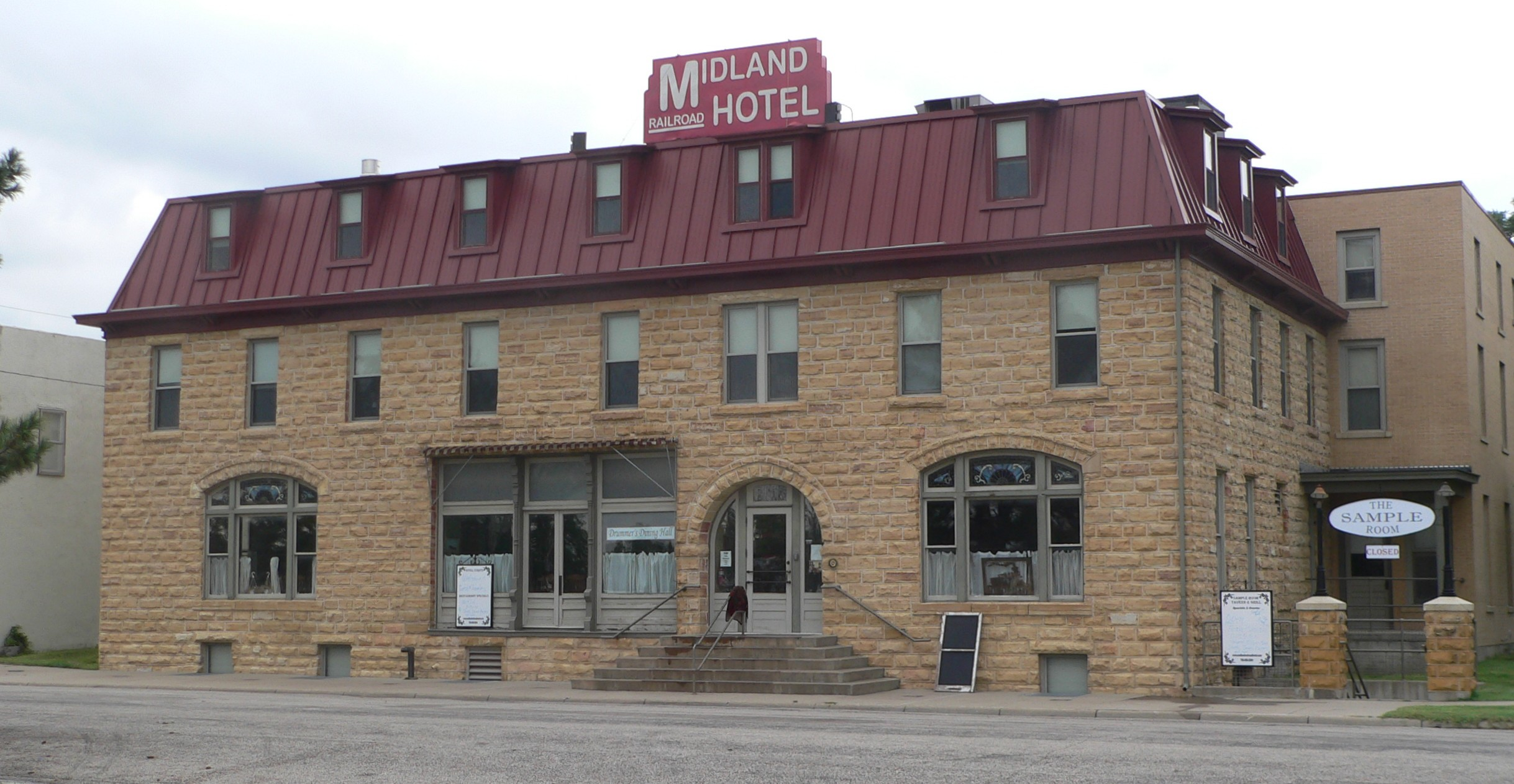
Midland Hotel, Wilson

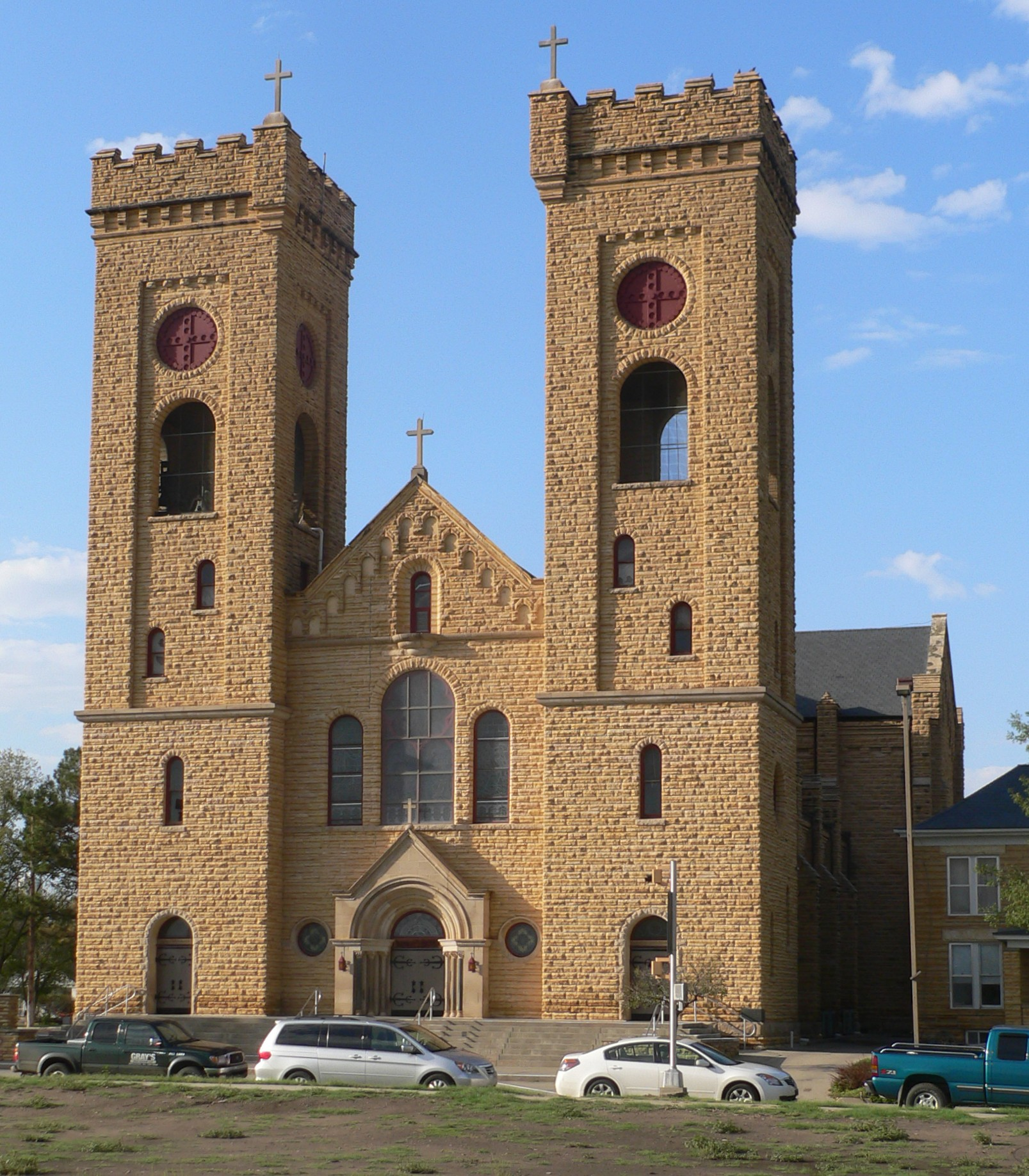
St. John the Baptist Catholic Church
(Beloit)

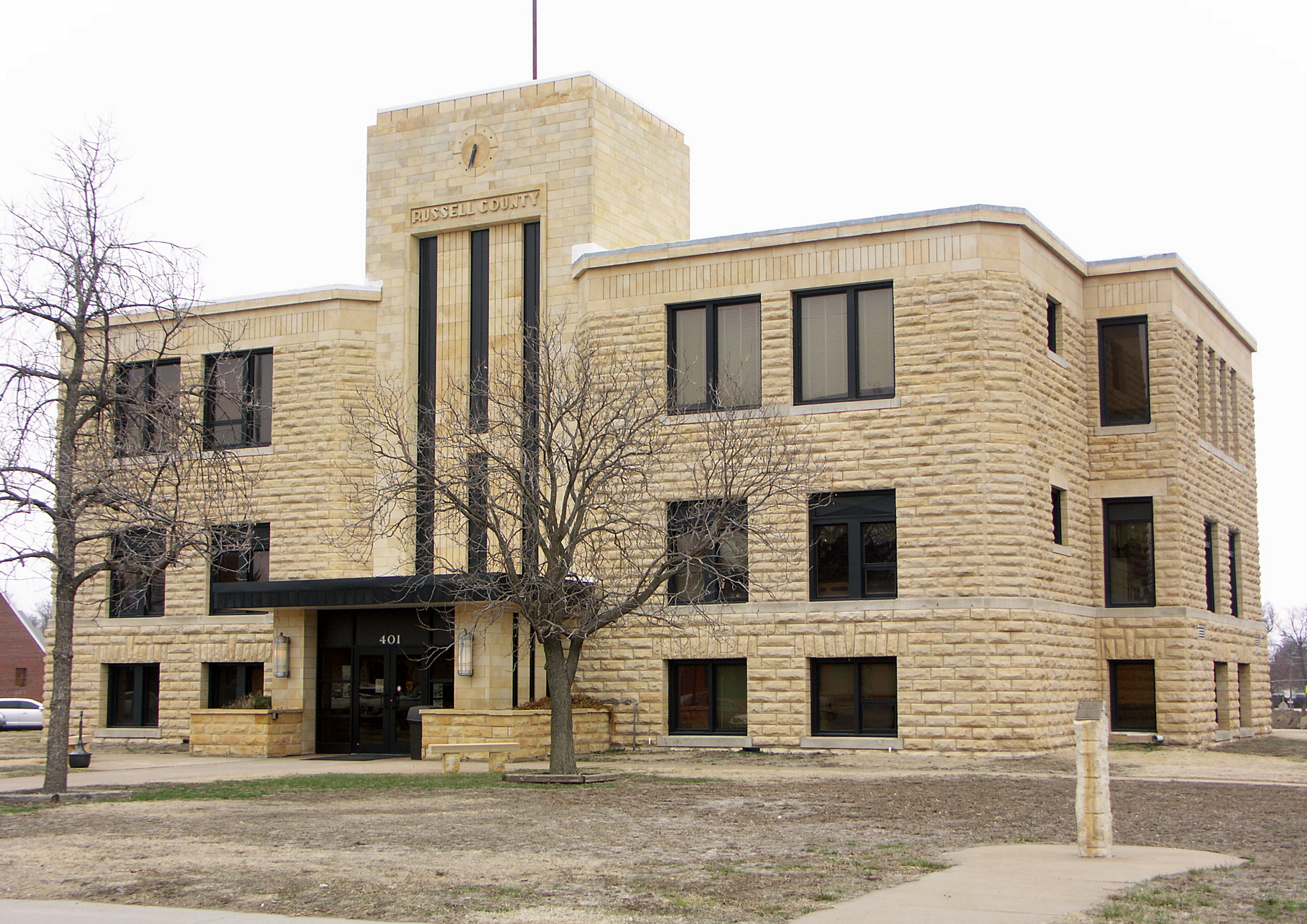
Russell County courthouse
(Russell)

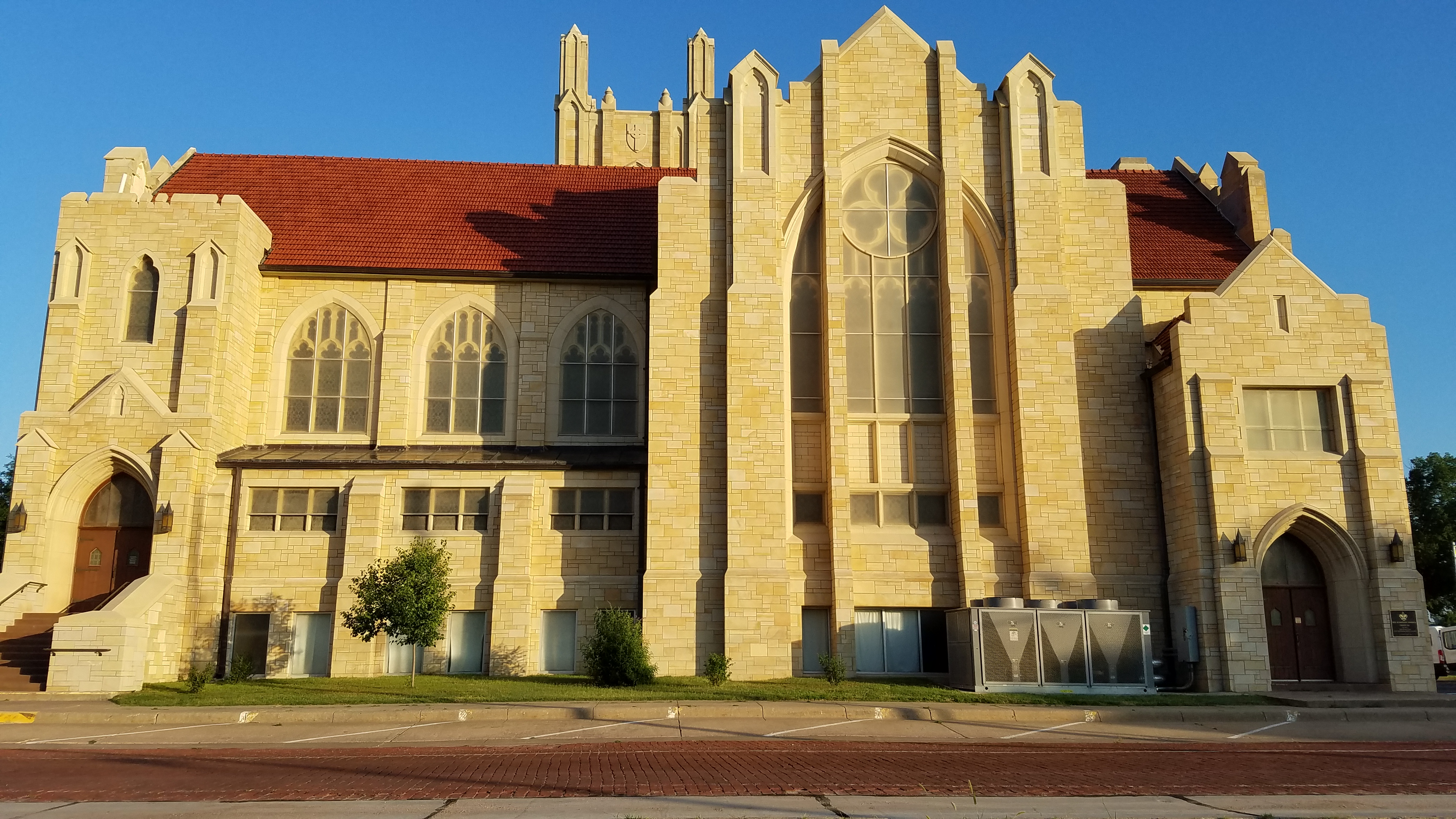
First United Methodist Church of Hays
Hays

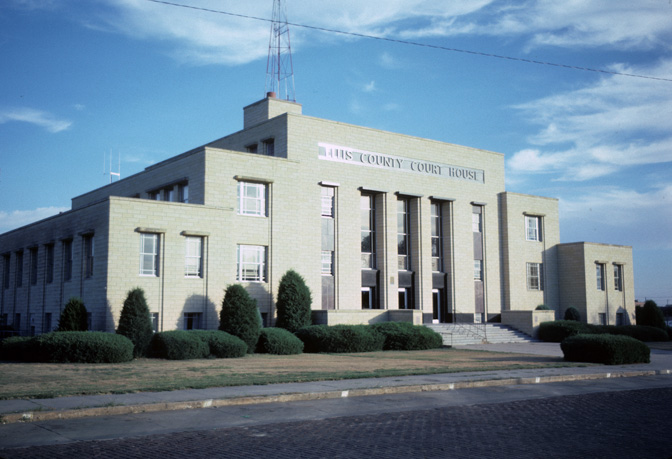
Ellis County courthouse
Hays

== See also ==
- List of fossiliferous stratigraphic units in Kansas
- Paleontology in Kansas
