= Orr Branch =

Creek in Texas, US

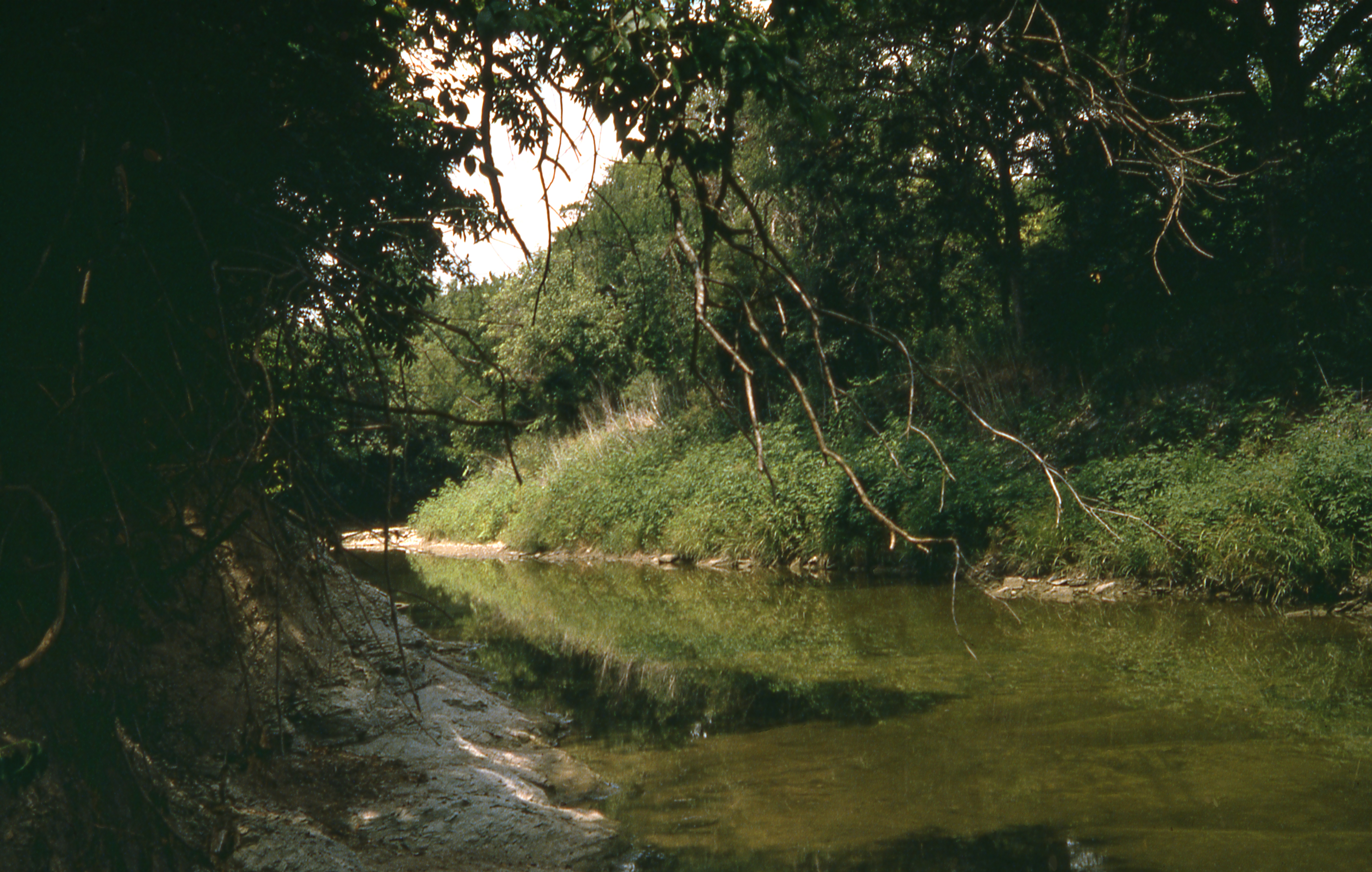
- An undeveloped stretch of the northern tributary of Orr Branch.

- Location of mouth

Location
- Country: United States
- State: Texas
- County: Dallas

Physical characteristics
- Source
  - coordinates: 32°54′02″N 96°47′44″W
- Mouth
  - coordinates: 32°54′42″N 96°46′36″W
- Length: 2 mi (3.2 km)

Orr Branch is a roughly 2-mile (3.22 km) creek in the White Rock/Trinity River watershed in eastern Texas. From its uppermost source near the intersection of Tibbs and West Ricks Circle streets, it runs northeast through a portion of suburban Dallas until it flows into White Rock Creek (of which it is a tributary) and ultimately feeds into White Rock Lake.

== History ==
From the end of the Pleistocene Epoch and into historic times, the Texas blackland prairie surrounding Orr Branch supported scattered herds of bison and (prior to European contact) the Native American tribes who used bison as a resource. In north central Texas, these tribes would have included the Kitikiti'sh (Wichita), Comanche, Caddo, and Cherokee.

By the mid-19th Century, cattle and other livestock had replaced the bison. Prairie grasses and forbs were vital forage for Texas Longhorns and other breeds being moved north along the ancient trace that came to be known as Preston Trail, the present-day Preston Road. This route was desirable in part because it traveled along the spine of a limestone ridge, or “cuesta” that separated the eastern and western zones of the Black Lands.

Overgrazing eventually depleted the value of these lands for livestock forage. With the invention of plows capable of breaking through the “black waxy” soil of the region, the prairie sod was turned and European-style farming came to the area. As geologist Robert T. Hill pointed out in 1901, “Large quantities of cotton, corn, and minor crops are annually raised upon these fertile lands.” Prairie not plowed for crops was mowed for hay, and a few of these old hayfields still stand open to the North Texas sun. Similarly, a scattering of farmhouses built in the late 19th and early 20th centuries can still be found at historic sites in Dallas and smaller cities across the area.

Deep cultivation, cotton farming and drought were not kind to the blackland soil, and by the mid-20th Century farm tracts began to be sold for other development. In 1947, a developed named Rick Strong purchased several parcels of land surrounding a major portion of Orr Branch, a City of Dallas addition that was incorporated as “Hillcrest Estates”. Centered on a roughly mile-long stretch of Northaven Road, these parcels of old pasture and farm structures were subdivided, typically into 300-foot-deep lots, some with horse corrals, and the neighborhood association's building restrictions required homes to be a minimum of 2,300 square feet. Landscaping on these semi-rural lots often involved adapting the native plant species.

By the end if the 20th Century, the land around Orr Branch had undergone its most drastic transformation since the demise of the bison and the arrival of the plow. Rampant real estate speculation throughout Texas had drastically inflated North Dallas land values, and what had been middle class homes were being acquired, demolished and replaced with opulent mansions. Home lots were re-landscaped wholesale and many of the native plants removed. At this point in time, the principle remnants of the original Blackland Prairie setting of the area are its riparian corridors, such as Orr Branch.

== Course ==
Water flowing in the main channel of Orr Branch travels northeast from the Hillcrest Estates/Northaven Road area to enter the mainstream of White Rock Creek at 32°54'42.0"N 96°46'35.0”W, a point just north of Forest Lane, south of present-day Bonner Park and west of North Central Expressway/US Highway 75. There are two tributaries of Orr Branch to the north of the mainstream, the western-most of these originating at a point about one half mile north of the intersection of Forest Lane and Preston Road. Water in this tributary flows through a series of small impoundments, under Forest Lane and merges with the main stream at the point where Orr Branch flows east under Hillcrest Road.

== Watershed ==
Orr Branch drains an area just over 2 square miles, the western portions of which are virtually flat. Elevation change through the stream channel runs from 600 feet above sea level at the outer rim of the stream's cuts to roughly 500 feet at the main channel of White Rock Creek. Weather conditions within this area correspond generally to statistics for the climate of Dallas as a whole.

With any powerful thunderstorm, turbulent water will rapidly fill the channels of Orr Branch. Major floods affected the White Rock Creek watershed in 1962 and 1964. On those occasions, the area inundated in places extended up to a quarter mile from the main channel of the Creek, but was very limited along most of Orr Branch, suggesting a high rate of flow in this tributary during such floods. Since the 1950s, the flat lands west of the stream have been dominated by paved suburban streets and adjacent homesites, suggesting a significant quantity of chemical and particulate water pollutants (e.g. motor oil, lawn fertilizers, pesticides, animal waste, tire rubber and brake dust) is carried into the channel by stormwater runoff. Invariably, this would lead to enhanced eutrophication in aquatic habitats and heightened environmental stress for resident plants and animals.

== Stream modifications ==
A major limiting factor for farming the Blackland Prairie was the availability of water. Tributary streams like Orr Branch would often run dry during unusually hot summers or lengthy droughts. Dams and stock tanks were constructed to retain surface water, and as R. T. Hill noted “for domestic purposes [prairie] inhabitants depend largely upon cisterns or ponds, the water from both of which is unwholesome”. With road improvements and annexation of the area by the City of Dallas, home sites were connected to municipal water and sewage networks, and the Orr Branch watershed was incorporated into the municipal storm water control network, and additional bridges and under-street culverts were installed. In the portion of Hillcrest Estates south of Northaven Road, a small chain of such water impoundments lies along Orr Branch, some of these descended from old stock tanks used by the precursor farms. Over time, dams on these ponds have been heightened, and bridges and retaining walls constructed, for increased depth, erosion control or enhanced aesthetics.

== Natural history /Wildlife / Biology ==
English naturalist Thomas Nuttall (1766–1859) was among the first trained botanists to describe the North American Great plains plant communities. On a journey west out of Fort Smith, Arkansas Territory in 1819, Nuttall encountered a portion of the Black Lands where they extend just north of the Red River (east of present day Durant, Oklahoma). There he noted many of the woody and herbaceous plant species still associated with prairie country.

Combining rich topsoils with an extensive network of riparian corridors, the prairies of North Central Texas host over 2000 species of plants (roughly 46 per cent of all plants species recorded for Texas). When one includes invertebrates, birds (migratory and resident species), mammals and other vertebrates, the Blackland Praririe comprises perhaps the most diverse biota of all the central North American prairies. For a current compilation of plants and animals observed in and around Orr Branch consult the citizen science observations assembled by INaturalist.

== Geology ==
The native topography of the Orr Branch area consists of flat to gently-rolling prairie broken by downward-cutting stream channels. Continuous exposures of bedrock are common only in the stream beds and lower areas of the stream embankments. Above these locations, the area's bedrock is covered at variable depths by characteristic Blackland Prairie soil. In his 1901 monograph on the "Black Land and Grand Prairies" of North Texas, R. T. Hill describes how the largest extent of these black lands is divided roughly north to south by a ridge of limestone, a feature for which he cited the local names "White Rock" and "Austin Chalk". In several locations from southern Dallas County and on south to Austin, Texas, this limestone emerges from the prairies in a prominent scarp, or escarpment. In north Dallas, however, this feature is much more subtle, yet as elsewhere it presents a west-facing fault exposure, accompanied by a gentle slope eastward, thus forming a cuesta. Hill points out that while the major water courses of this region flow southeastward, toward the Gulf of Mexico, tributaries near the Austin Chalk escarpment tend to be somewhat perpendicular to the larger channels and parallel to the escarpment, thus explaining the northeasterly trend of Orr Branch.

Bedrock west of the escarpment consists of the dark Eagle Ford shale, the parent rock for the prairie's most viscous soil textures. In the days of widespread cultivation along Preston Trail, these Eagle Ford Prairie soils were conspicuous. The east slope of the cuesta, with shallower soil of a brighter texture and color, Hill dubbed the White Rock Prairie. The Austin limestone exposed in the beds of the Orr Branch stream channels is marine in origin and of Cretaceous age, and while not generally fossiliferous will occasionally produce the preserved remains of Inoceramus clams, ammonites, and large vertebrates such as Xiphactinus, a predaceous fish.

== Bibliography ==
- Schmidly, David J. Texas Mammals East of the Balcones Fault Zone. Texas A&M University Press (1983)
- Phelan, Richard. Texas Wild: the Land, Plants and Animals of the Lone Star State. ExcaliburBooks (1976)
