= Boquillas Formation =

Geologic formation in West Texas

- Stratigraphic range: Cenomanian to Santonian
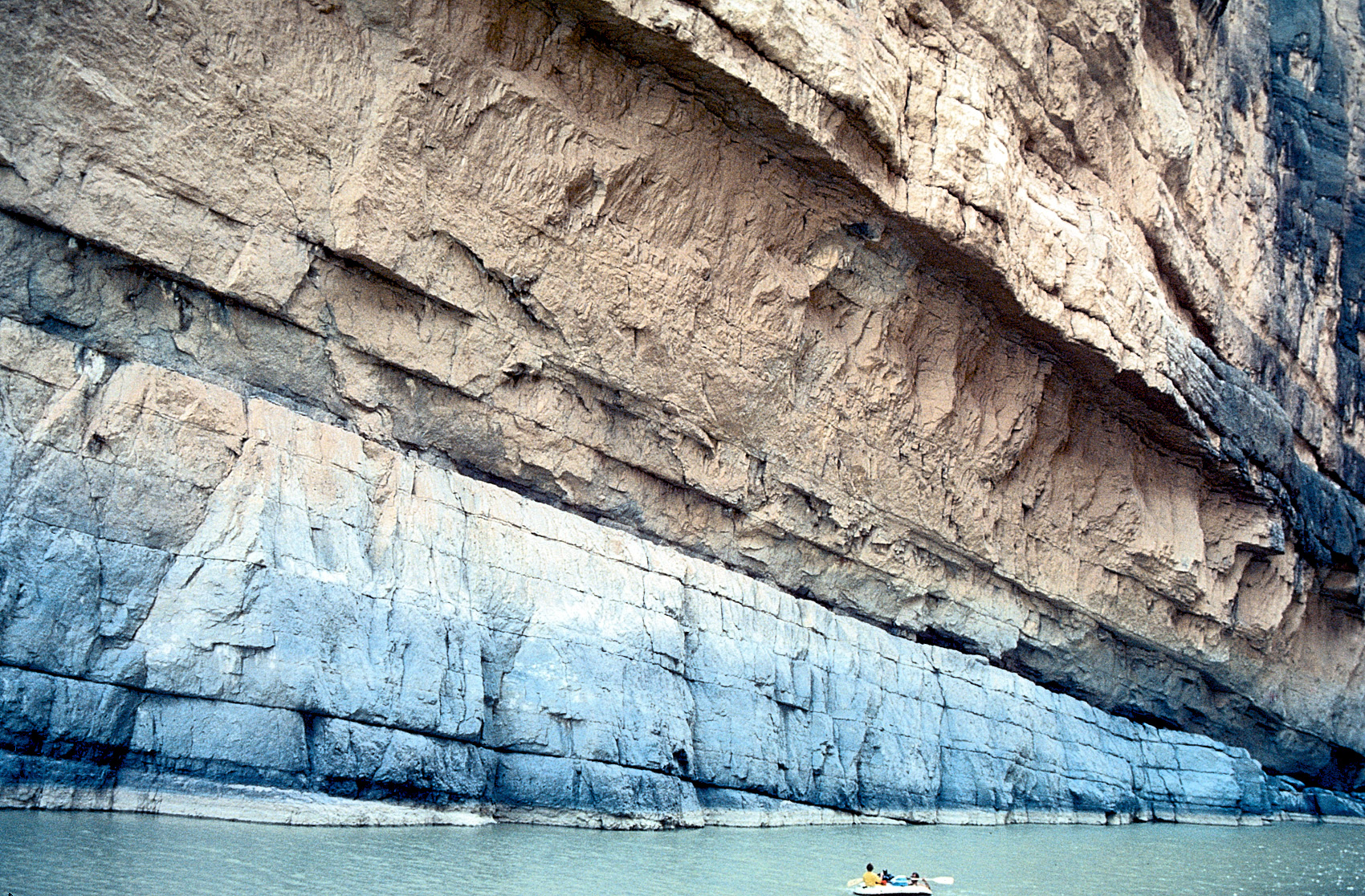
- Limestone of the Boquillas Formation in Big Bend National Park
- Type: Formation
- Unit of: Eagle Ford Group / Terlingua Group
- Sub-units: Ernst Member, San Vicente Member, Terrell Member, Lozier Canyon Member, Antonio Creek Member, Scott Ranch Member, Langtry Member
- Underlies: Austin Chalk or Aguja Formation
- Overlies: Buda Limestone

Lithology
- Primary: Marl
- Other: Limestone, volcanic ash beds

Location
- Region: West Texas
- Country: United States

Type section
- Named for: Boquillas post office, Big Bend National Park, Texas
- Named by: J. A. Udden

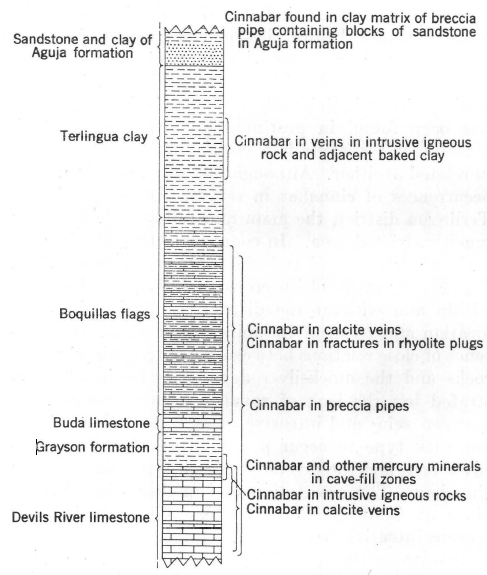
Boquillas Formation - stratigraphy

The Boquillas Formation is a geologic formation deposited during the Late Cretaceous in modern-day West Texas. It is typically composed of alternating marls and limestones with thin volcanic ash beds (bentonites). It was named for outcrops near the former Boquillas post office in Big Bend National Park. The term Boquillas Formation has been used for rocks that outcrop from Del Rio, Texas to as far west as Doña Ana County, New Mexico.

Vertebrate fossils found in the Boquillas Formation include mosasaurs, fish bones, and shark's teeth. Invertebrate fossils found in the formation include ammonites, swimming crinoids, inoceramid clams, sea urchins, oysters, and foraminifera
