= Arcadia Park Shale =

- Stratigraphic range: Mid to Late Turonian; 92.5–90 Ma
- Type: Formation
- Unit of: Eagle Ford Group
- Sub-units: Kamp Ranch Limestone, Bells Sandstone, Maribel Shale, Sub-Clarksville Sandstone
- Underlies: Austin Chalk
- Overlies: Britton Formation

Lithology
- Primary: Shale
- Other: Marl, limestone, sandstone, volcanic ash beds

Location
- Region: Texas
- Country: United States

Type section
- Named for: Arcadia Park railway station, Texas
- Named by: W. L. Moreman

The Arcadia Park Shale is a geologic formation within the Eagle Ford Group that outcrops in the northern portion of East Texas. It was deposited during the Middle to Late Turonian of the Late Cretaceous. It was originally described by W. L. Moreman from outcrops near the former Arcadia Park railway station west of downtown Dallas, where it is 100 ft (30 m) thick. In the type area there is an unconformity between the Arcadia Park and the underlying Britton Formation. The base of the Arcadia Park is a thin limestone termed the Kamp Ranch Limestone. The Kamp Ranch Limestone is made up of broken pieces (prisms) of Inoceramus clams, and also contains shark's teeth. The remainder of the Arcadia Park in the Dallas area is shale with concretions. Sandstones are found within the Arcadia Park north of Dallas. The sandstones have been termed the Bells Sandstone Member for outcrops in Grayson County, and the Sub-Clarksville Sandstone in the subsurface. The shale overlying the Bells Sandstone has been named the Maribel Shale

Fossils that occur in the Arcadia Park include shark's teeth and other fish remains, ammonites, inoceramid clams, oysters, and foraminifera.

The Sub-Clarksville Sandstone is a conventional source of oil production in East Texas.

== See also ==
- List of fossiliferous stratigraphic units in Texas
- Paleontology in Texas
