= Eagle Ford Group =

Texas rock formation associated with petroleum deposits

- Stratigraphic range: Cenomanian-Turonian; ~96–90 Ma
- Type: Group
- Sub-units: Britton Formation, Arcadia Park Shale Formation, Lake Waco Formation, South Bosque Formation, Boquillas Formation
- Underlies: Austin Chalk
- Overlies: Woodbine Formation or Buda Limestone

Lithology
- Primary: Shale
- Other: Marl, limestone, sandstone, volcanic ash beds

Location
- Region: Texas
- Country: United States

Type section
- Named for: Eagle Ford, Texas
- Named by: Robert T. Hill
- Year defined: 1887
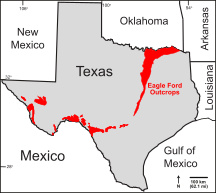

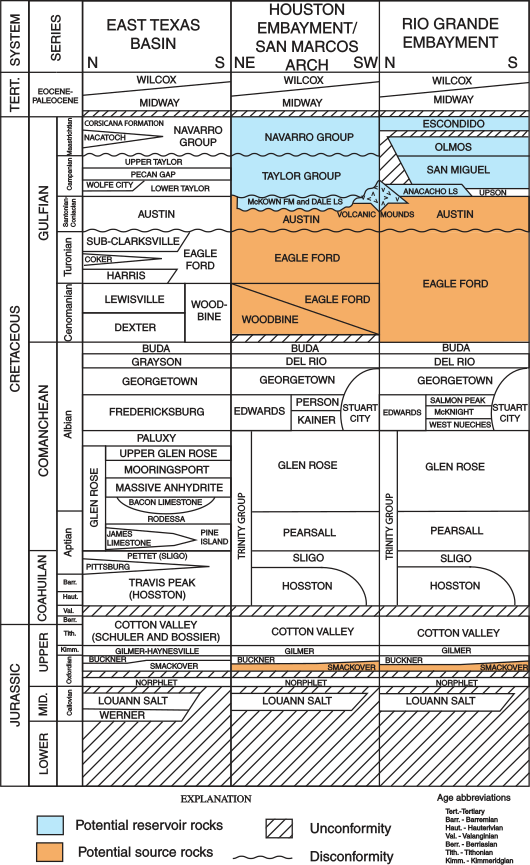
Eagle Ford stratigraphic column

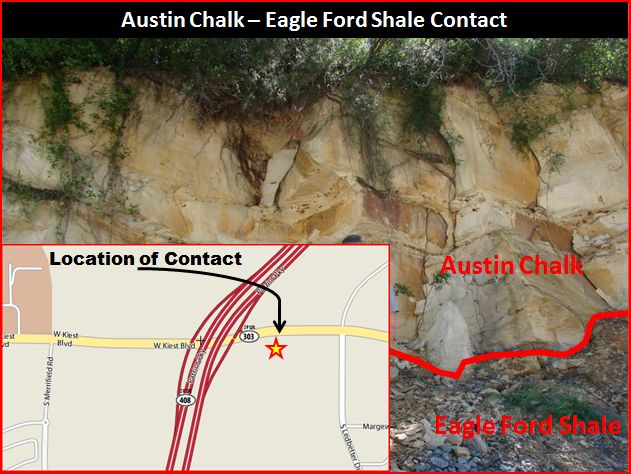
Outcrop of the Eagle Ford and Austin Chalk Contact off Kiest Blvd, 1/2 mile east of Patriot Pky in Dallas County

The Eagle Ford Group (also called the Eagle Ford Shale) is a sedimentary rock formation deposited during the Cenomanian and Turonian ages of the Late Cretaceous over much of the modern-day state of Texas. The Eagle Ford is predominantly composed of organic matter-rich fossiliferous marine shales and marls with interbedded thin limestones. It derives its name from outcrops on the banks of the West Fork of the Trinity River near the old community of Eagle Ford, which is now a neighborhood within the city of Dallas. The Eagle Ford outcrop belt trends from the Oklahoma-Texas border southward to San Antonio, westward to the Rio Grande, Big Bend National Park, and the Quitman Mountains of West Texas. It also occurs in the subsurface of East Texas and South Texas, where it is the source rock for oil found in the Woodbine, Austin Chalk, and the Buda Limestone, and is produced unconventionally in South Texas and the "Eaglebine" play of East Texas.

The Eagle Ford was one of the most actively drilled targets for unconventional oil and gas in the United States in 2010, but its output had dropped sharply by 2015. By the summer of 2016, Eagle Ford spending had dropped by two-thirds from $30 billion in 2014 to $10 billion, according to an analysis from the research firm Wood Mackenzie. This strike has been the hardest hit of any oil fields in the world. As of 2016, the spending was, however, expected to increase to $11.6 billion in 2017. A full recovery was not expected any time soon.

Fossils are relatively common in Eagle Ford rocks. Fossilized Plesiosaurs, mosasaurs, Fish, shark teeth, crustaceans, sea urchins, feather stars, ammonites, oysters, clams, and other gastropod shells have all been found there.

== Depositional environment ==
Schematic E-W section showing the Eagle Ford Shale among the geological strata beneath the DFW Metroplex

The Eagle Ford rocks were created by the remains of sea life that dropped to the floor of an inland sea (or epeiric sea) that covered much of modern-day Texas. The Texas shelf during the Cenomanian-Turonian was bounded by the Ouachita Uplift to the north, the Sabine Uplift to the East, relict reef margins of the Stuart City Formation and the Sligo Formation to the southeast, and the Western Interior Seaway to the west. The East Texas and South Texas regions were divided by an extension of the Llano Uplift known as the San Marcos Arch. Primary basins active during Eagle Ford deposition were the East Texas and Brazos Basins in East Texas and the Maverick Basin in South Texas.

The bottom waters of the Eagle Ford sea were starved of oxygen when most of the Eagle Ford material dropped to the sea floor, and this is related to the global Oceanic Anoxic Event 2 (OAE2), or Cenomanian-Turonian boundary event, although the Texas shelf became that way nearly two million years prior to OAE2. The low-oxygen conditions helped preserve the organic matter that ultimately generated the hydrocarbons associated with the Eagle Ford in the subsurface. Evidence for anoxia include the high amounts of organic matter, the lack of fossils or trace fossils of the kind of creatures that live on the sea floor, and enrichment in the redox proxies molybdenum and vanadium.

After the significant drop in sea level (marine regression) associated with deposition of the Woodbine during the Early Cenomanian, the sea level began to rise (marine transgression), allowing for the deposition of Lower Eagle Ford organic-rich marls in South Texas and limestones of the Terrell Member of the Boquillas Formation in West Texas starting at about 96 million years ago. The rise in sea level eventually drowned the East Texas Woodbine river deltas, initiating Eagle Ford deposition in East Texas. The initial deposits, known as the Six Flags Limestone in Dallas and the Bluebonnet Limestone in Waco, are calcarenites predominantly composed of disaggregated prisms of "Inoceramus" clams and planktonic foraminifera tests.

Following deposition of the calcarenites, a river delta began to prograde from the Ouachita Uplift to the northern East Texas Basin. Although the sandstones and siltstones from this delta, known as the Templeton Member, were originally placed within the Woodbine Formation, the ammonites found within them indicate that they are better associated with the Eagle Ford. In areas unaffected by the Templeton Delta, depositional rates were low, producing a condensed section composed of organic-rich, calcareous marls, limestones, and volcanic ash beds in both South Texas and West Texas. The microfossils found within the marls are predominantly coccoliths and planktonic foraminifera, whereas the limestones contain abundant radiolaria and calcispheres (calcareous cysts produced by some dinoflagellates). Inoceramus fragments and fish bones are also found in these deposits.

During the Late Cenomanian the Sabine Uplift along the modern-day Texas/Louisiana border became active, causing erosion of Eagle Ford and Woodbine sediments and deposition within the Harris Delta complex. Clay from this delta reached as far south as DeWitt County, Texas.

Towards the end of the Late Cenomanian, the bottom waters of the Texas shelf and the Western Interior Seaway became oxygenated, which may be related to the sea-level maximum associated with the Cenomanian-Turonian boundary event. Evidence for this oxygenation event, known as the "Benthonic Zone," include an increase in the abundance of benthic organism fossils and bioturbation, a decrease in redox proxies uranium, molybdenum, and vanadium, and a reduction in organic matter. This oxygenation event marks the boundary between the Lower and Upper Eagle Ford in West Texas and the subsurface of South Texas. In general, Upper Eagle Ford rocks deposited during the Cenomanian-Turonian boundary event (OAE2) contain much less organic matter than Lower Eagle Ford rocks, which is the reverse of organic matter trends seen in the global ocean. An unconformity occurs throughout East Texas at this level, possibly due to a lack of sediments reaching the basin during the sea-level maximum.

The sea-level began to drop after the Early Turonian sea-level maximum; this is most obvious at outcrops near Langtry, Texas, where water depths became shallower than 100 ft (30 m). This limestone-rich unit is known as the Langtry Member of the Boquillas Formation. It contains very little organic matter, and abundant sea urchin fossils. The Kamp Ranch Limestone is found above the unconformity in the Dallas area. It is similar to the older Six Flags and Bluebonnet Limestones, as it is predominantly composed of disaggregated prisms of Inoceramus clams and has ripple marks indicative of shallow-water deposition. As the sea level continued to fall during the Late Turonian, deltaic sediments originating from the Ouachita Uplift prograded into the northern East Texas region. These sandstones are known as the Sub-Clarksville Delta in the subsurface and the Bells Sandstone in outcrop. In the South Texas subsurface, the age equivalent unit to the Langtry Member is more calcareous than the underlying Upper Eagle Ford rocks, making them difficult to distinguish from the limestones of the overlying Austin Chalk, although an unconformity is found between the Eagle Ford and the Austin Chalk in both South Texas and East Texas.

== Eagle Ford unconformity ==
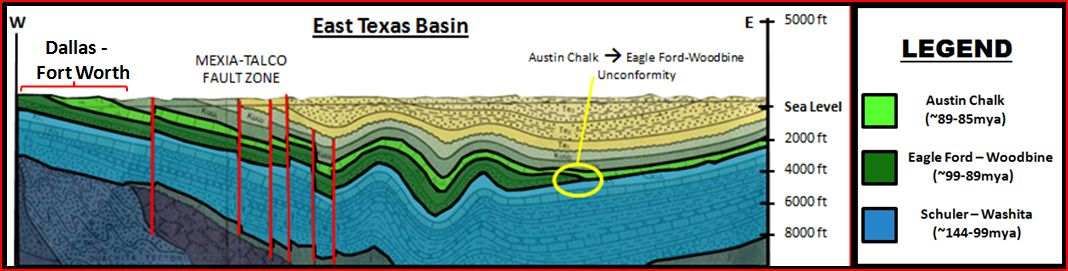
This cross-section illustrates how the reactivation of the Sabine Uplift in the East developed the Woodbine/Eagle Ford Unconformity that is present in the subsurface of Far East Texas

In the Cretaceous after the Woodbine and Eagle Ford formations were deposited, the Sabine Uplift started to become elevated again due to its reactivation ~88 mya. A decrease in the effective elastic plate thicknesses caused the basin to subside as the uplift became increasingly elevated. As a result, an estimated 150 m of uplift over the Sabine region caused the eastern parts of the Woodbine and Eagle Ford formations to have a subaerial exposure, which eventually resulted in their easterly erosion. Deposition of the Austin Chalk after this erosional occurrence caused a sealing of the East Texas petroleum reservoir and the creation of a middle Cretaceous unconformity. Currently, the Sabine Uplift is in the subsurface, and the middle Cretaceous unconformity is not seen because it is buried below a massive wedge of clastic sediments from the Late Cretaceous to the present.

== Oil and natural gas production ==
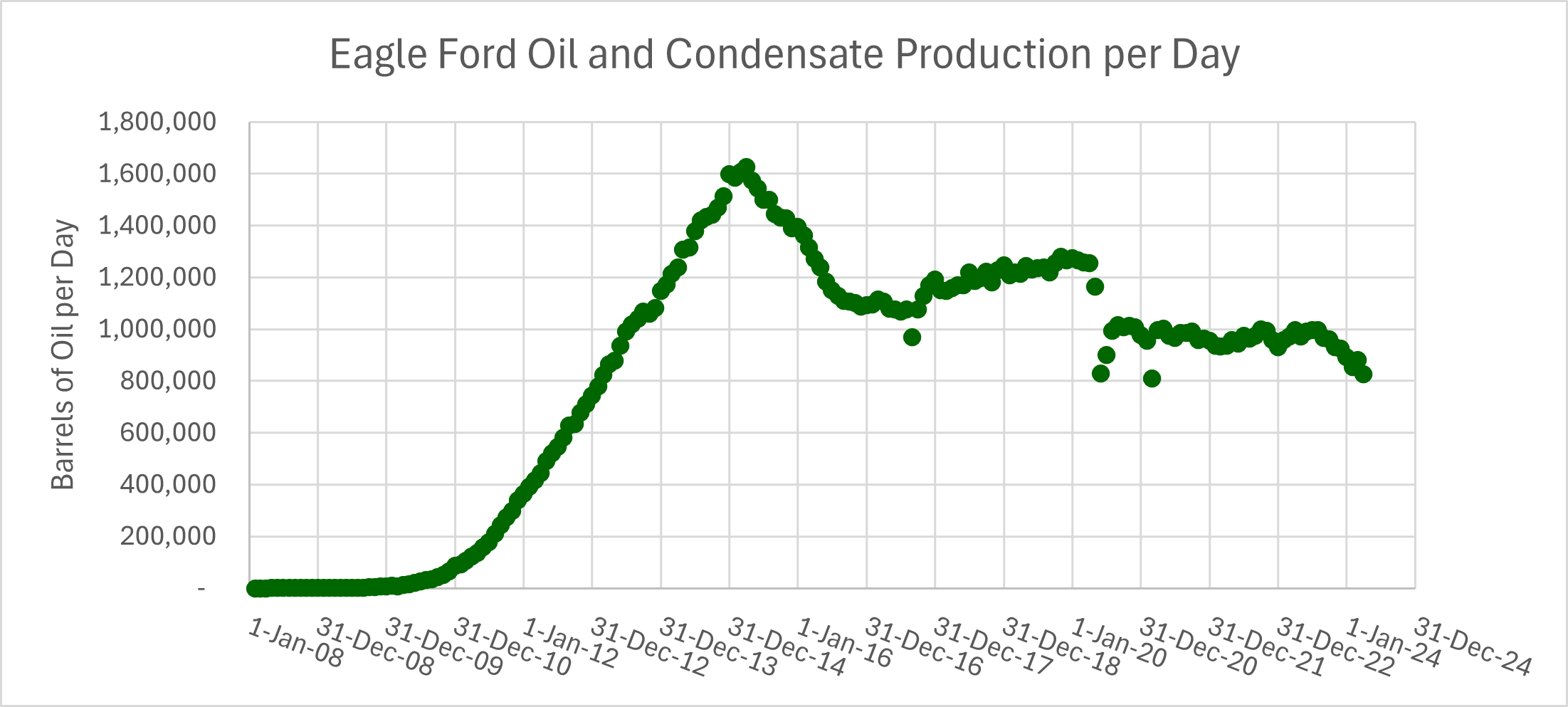
Daily oil production from the Eagle Ford Formation, January 2008 - March 2024

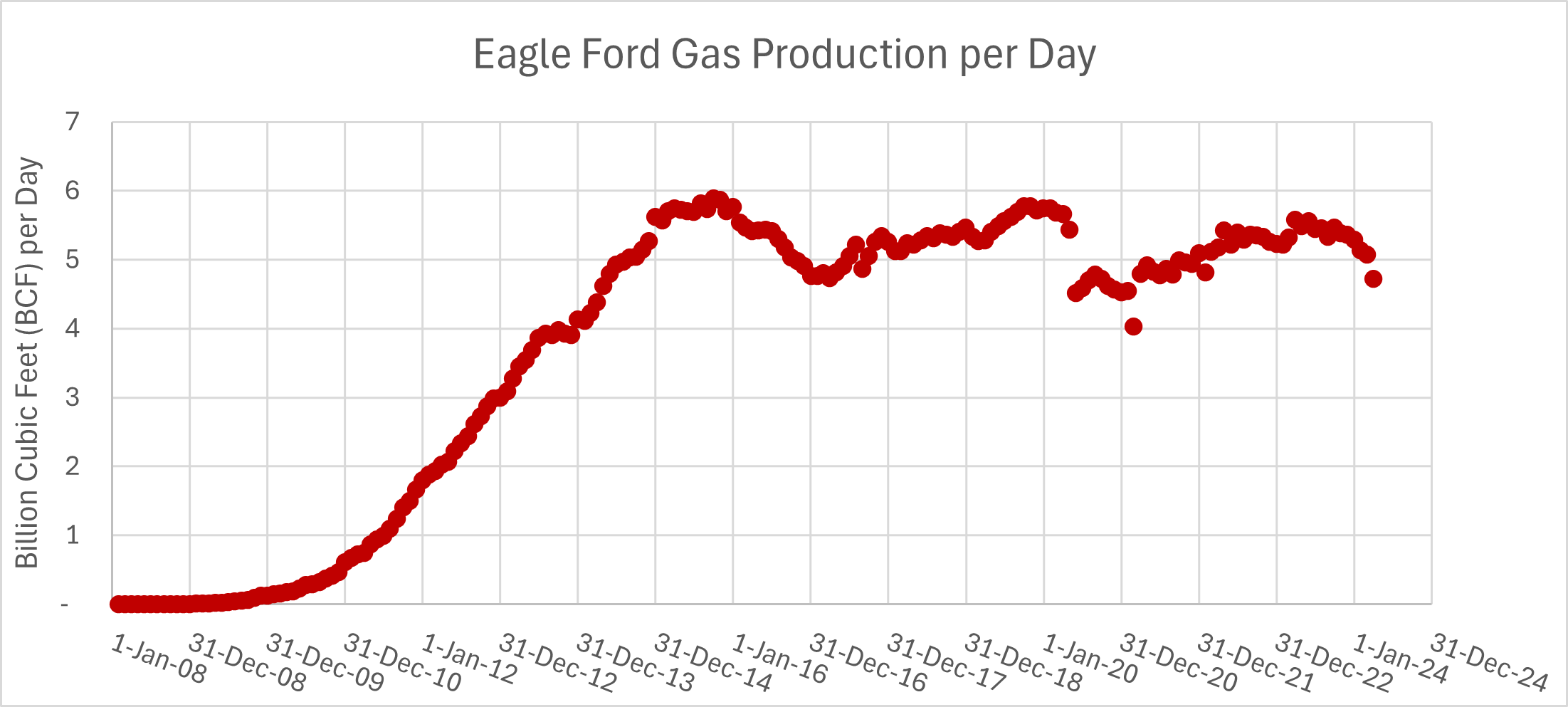
Daily gas production from the Eagle Ford Formation, January 2008 - March 2024

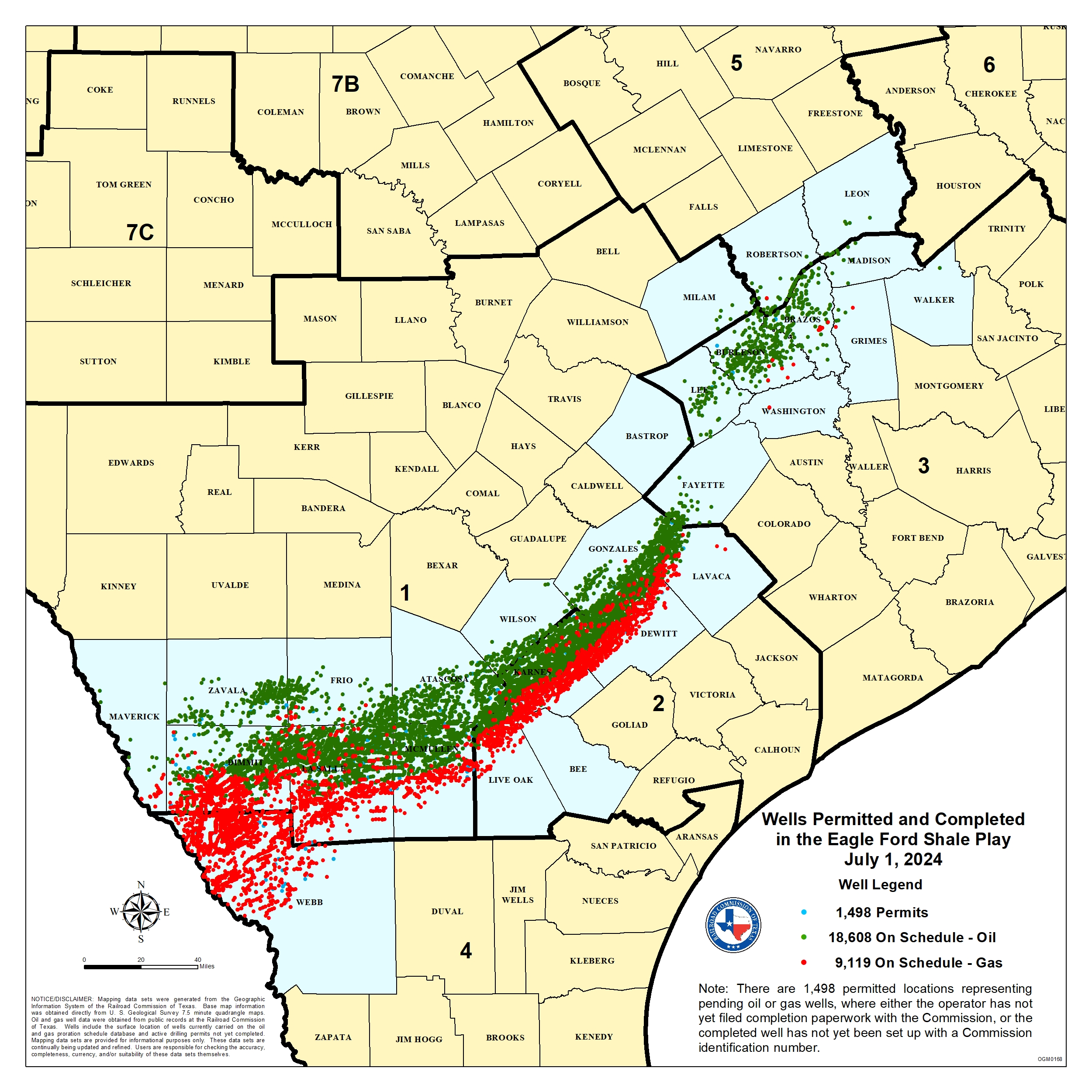
Map of the Eagle Ford Shale Play, published by the Texas Railroad Commission

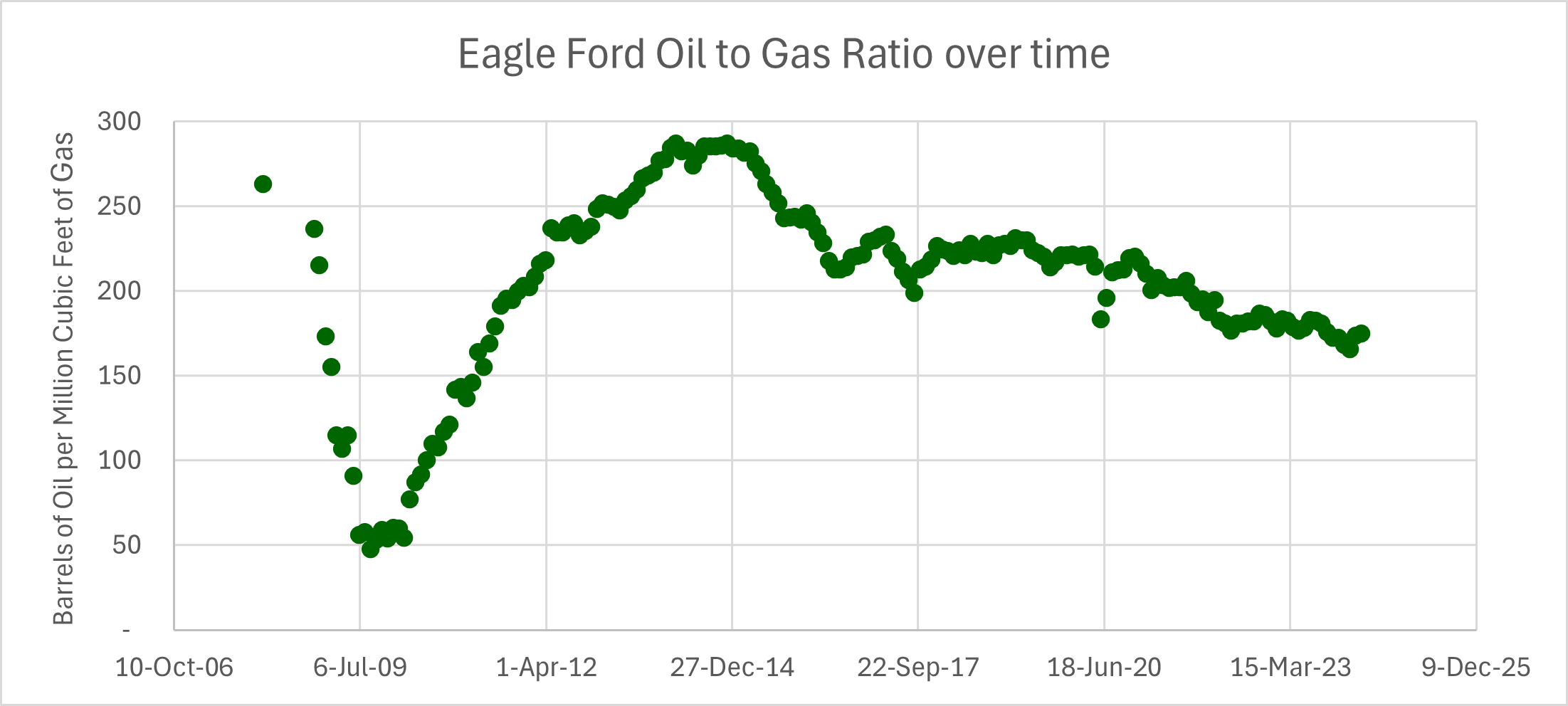
The oil to gas ratio from the Eagle Ford increased in 2010 when companies shifted drilling from gas-rich to more oil-rich areas. As reservoir becomes more depleted, the oil to gas ratio has trended lower.

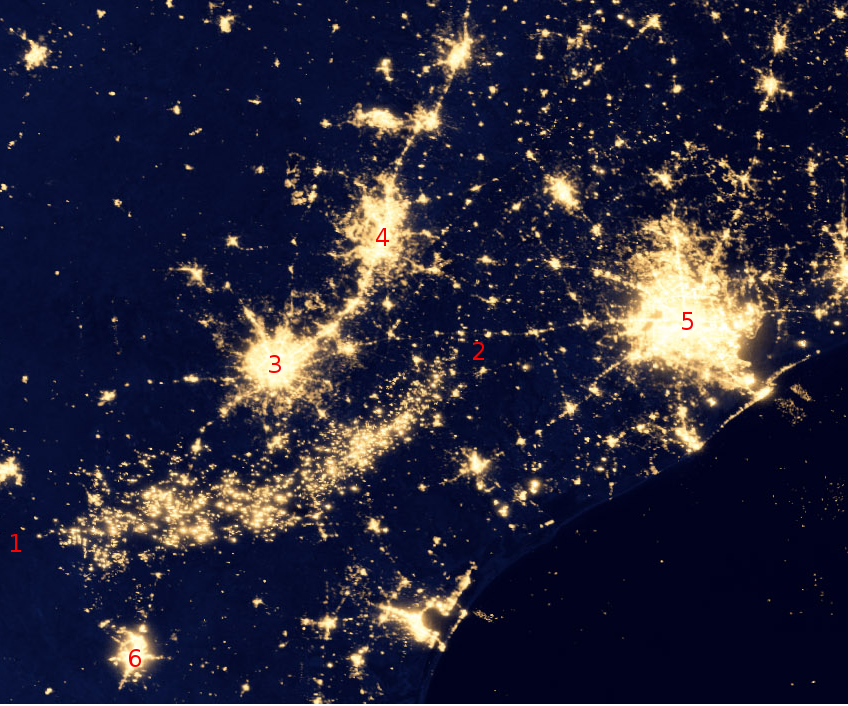
Eagle Ford Shale flares visible from space (green and infrared wavelengths), in the arc between "1" and "2", amid cities in south Texas in 2012

Paul Basinski, the geologist who helped discover the Eagle Ford basin, has been called "one of the fathers of fracking". Petrohawk drilled the first well to unconventionally produce gas from the Eagle Ford in 2008, in LaSalle County, Texas. Oil companies quickly extended the productive area, which stretches from the Texas-Mexico border in Webb and Maverick counties and extend 400 miles toward East Texas. The play is 50 miles wide and an average of 250 feet thick at a depth between 4000 and 12,000 feet. The shale contains a high amount of carbonate, which makes it brittle, and it is thus easier to use hydraulic fracturing to produce the oil or gas.

The oil reserves in the Eagle Ford Shale Play were estimated in 2011 at 3 billion barrels. The U.S. Energy Information Administration (EIA) estimated that the Eagle Ford held 50.2 trillion cubic feet (TCF) of unproved, technically recoverable gas. The average well was estimated to recover 2.36 billion cubic feet (BCF) of gas.

In 2011, the Eagle Ford produced an average of 1.14 BCF/day of gas and 211,000 barrels/day of oil and condensate. In 2012, the Eagle Ford produced an average of 2.43 BCF/day of gas and 566,000 barrels/day of oil and condensate. By the end of 2013, production had skyrocketed to well over 1,000,000 BOE/day. In 2013, the Eagle Ford produced an average of 3.73 BCF/day of gas and 975,000 barrels/day of oil and condensate. In 2014, the Eagle Ford produced an average of 4.85 BCF/day of gas and 1,376,000 barrels/day of oil and condensate.

The large increase in tight oil production from the Eagle Ford is one of factors that led to the oil price drop of late 2014. Total production peaked in March 2015 at 2.62 million BOE/day (1.625 million BO/day and 5.75 BCF/day).

Eagle Ford production has occurred in 27 counties in Texas. The large area of oil and gas operations of the Eagle Ford are visible on nighttime satellite photos of the United States, appearing as a diffuse bright patch about two hundred miles long, between the more concentrated lights of San Antonio, Austin, Houston, Victoria, Corpus Christi, Laredo, and neighboring cities.

=== Proven reserves (US)* ===
- US EIA, 2010: 2.5 trillion cubic feet (TCF) of gas
- US EIA, 2011: 1.25 billion barrels of oil, 8.4 TCF of natural gas
- US EIA, 2012: 3.37 billion barrels of oil
- US EIA, 2019: 4.30 billion barrels of oil
- US EIA, 2020: 3.25 billion barrels of oil
- US EIA, 2021: 3.61 billion barrels of oil, 36.4 TCF of natural gas
- US EIA, 2022: 3.82 billion barrels of oil, 39.6 TCF of natural gas

*EIA estimate includes reserves in the basin in other overlying and underlying strata including the Austin Chalk, Olmos/San Miguel, etc.

=== Mexico ===
The Eagle Ford Formation extends into northern Mexico's Burgos Basin, where it is known as the Boquillas Formation and has an average thickness of 200 metres (660 ft). Total organic content (TOC) is estimated to average 5%. Technically recoverable hydrocarbons are estimated to be 343 trillion cubic feet of shale gas and 6.3 billion barrels of tight oil. The national oil company Pemex first began exploring in 2010. Pemex had an exploration program in progress until 2015.

In April 2013, Pemex started producing the nation's first shale gas well, just south of the U.S. border. The well was completed in the equivalent of the Eagle Ford Formation. Gas drilling in the Burgos Basin, close to the U.S. border, has been hampered by drug gangs. One Mexican industry expert said that Mexico was unlikely to develop the Eagle Ford because of lack of pipeline infrastructure and lack of expertise and because the Mexican company Pemex was investing in oil deposits that yield a higher rate of return.

=== Decline in crude oil prices, 2015 onward ===
With the worldwide decline in crude oil prices in 2015, a sharp downturn swept through Eagle Ford play. In January 2015, there were 840 active drilling rigs in Texas as a whole; by the end of the year, 321. Within the Eagle Ford play, the decline during these twelve months was from 200 to 76 rigs. The oil price decline rendered it uneconomical to drill sub-optimal wells. Particularly hard hit in the decline were the oil-field workers in South Texas.

== See also ==
- List of fossiliferous stratigraphic units in Texas
- Paleontology in Texas
