= Britton Formation =

- Stratigraphic range: Middle Cenomanian to Early Turonian 96–93 Ma
- Type: Geological formation
- Unit of: Eagle Ford Group
- Underlies: Arcadia Park Shale
- Overlies: Tarrant Formation

Lithology
- Primary: Shale
- Other: Marl, limestone, sandstone, volcanic ash beds

Location
- Region: East Texas
- Country: United States

Type section
- Named for: Britton, Texas
- Named by: W. L. Moreman

The Britton Formation is a geologic formation deposited during the Middle Cenomanian to the Early Turonian ages of the Late Cretaceous in modern-day East Texas. It forms the lower half of the Eagle Ford Group in the northern portion of East Texas. The formation was named by W. L. Moreman in 1932 for outcrops on Mountain Creek near the small town of Britton, south of Dallas. In the Dallas area it has been subdivided into the Six Flags Limestone, Turner Park Member, and Camp Wisdom Member. The Six Flags Limestone is a 3 ft (1 m) thick fossiliferous calcarenite made up of pieces (prisms) of Inoceramus clams. The Turner Park and Camp Wisdom Members were subdivided based on the numerous volcanic ash beds (bentonites) found in the Turner Park, and the common occurrence of concretions in the Camp Wisdom. They are approximately 120 ft (37 m) (Turner Park) and 250 ft (76 m) (Camp Wisdom) thick in the Dallas area. Thin sandstones known as the Templeton Member are found in Grayson County, north of Dallas, that are age equivalent to the lower part of the Turner Park Member. The Templeton Member was originally described as a part of the Woodbine, but it was recently placed in the Britton Formation of the Eagle Ford Group based on its age as derived by ammonites. Plesiosaur remains are among the vertebrate fossils that have been recovered from its strata.

== Paleofauna ==
Vertebrate fossils found in the Britton Formation include plesiosaurs and shark teeth.

Invertebrate fossils found in the Britton Formation include crustaceans, ammonites, Inoceramus, foraminifera, and ostracods.

Archosaurs of the Britton Formation
Genus	Species	Location	Stratigraphic position	Abundance	Notes	Images
Cimoliopterus	C. dunni				A pteranodontoid.	Cimoliopterus

== See also ==
- Plesiosaur stratigraphic distribution
