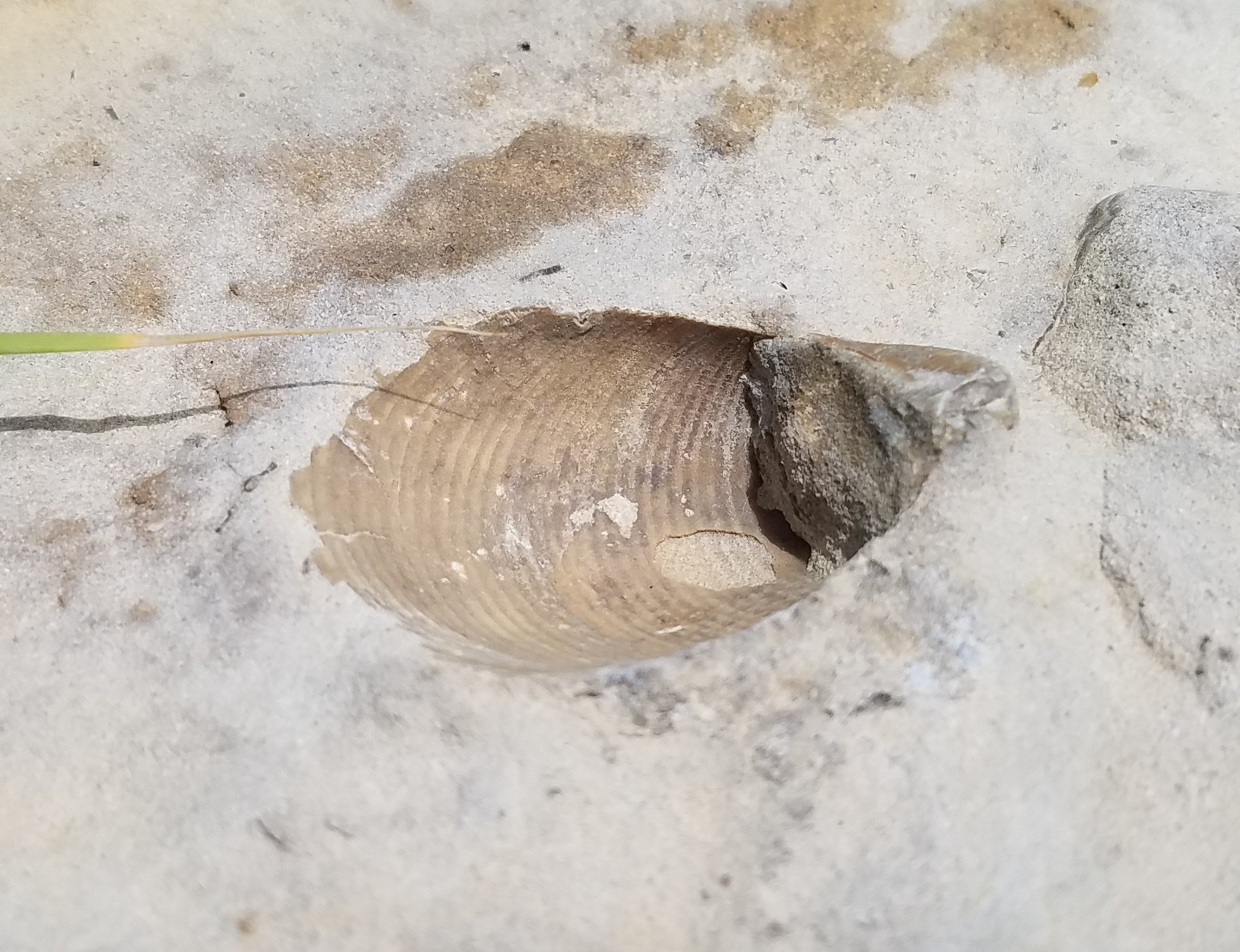
- Immature Inoceramus cuvieri found in Fencepost limestone.

Scientific classification
- Domain: Eukaryota
- Kingdom: Animalia
- Phylum: Mollusca
- Class: Bivalvia
- Order: Pteriida
- Family: †Inoceramidae
- Genus: †Inoceramus
- Species: †I. cuvieri

Binomial name
- †Inoceramus cuvieri (Sowerby 1814)

= Inoceramus cuvieri =

Inoceramus cuvieri Temporal range: Middle Turonian

Extinct species of bivalve

Inoceramus cuvieri is an extinct species of the extinct genus Inoceramus of Bivalve mollusks that serves as an index fossil of chalky rocks of Turonian age of the Cretaceous Period in Europe and North America.

== Description ==
Inoceramus cuvieri are commonly found as brown shells, usually with some shine. Immature I. cuvieri are not as flat as other shells in the same rock, having a high hump for its umbo, and having much thinner growth lines. Immature thin shells appear as fragile as other bivalves found in the same rocks. Mature I. cuvieri are flat and can be around 1 meter in size, leaving much thicker shells.

== Environment ==
Inoceramus cuvieri lived in shallow, temperate, normal-salinity inland seaways where the bottom was calcareous mud, corresponding to the maximum depth and width of the Greenhorn sequence of the Western Interior Seaway. The depths of as much as 1,000 feet (300 m) were far enough from shore for clear water and slow sedimentation, and the bottom deep enough for rare wave action disturbance. Fragments of shells from large individuals are encrusted by Ostrea congesta, two Serpula species, and other sessile animals, reflecting that the shells of large Inoceramus floating on the mud were commonly the only hard surfaces available for colonization.

== Distribution ==
Inoceramus cuvieri are found throughout both middle Turonian Europe and the middle Turonian Western Interior Seaway.

In the High Plains of North America, I. cuvieri is an index fossil of the chalky lower Carlile Shale and upper Greenhorn Limestone and the corresponding bedding of the Mancos Shale, and shells of juveniles are particularly common in the Fencepost limestone bed.
