= Kamp Ranch Limestone =

Geologic formation in Dallas County

- Stratigraphic range: Cretaceous
- Type: Formation
- Unit of: Arcadia Park Shale

Location
- Region: Texas
- Country: United States

The Kamp Ranch Limestone is a geologic formation in Dallas County, Texas. It preserves fossils dating back to the Cretaceous period. The most notable is Dallasaurus, a squamate that was the first of the aquatic mosasaurs.

== See also ==
- List of fossiliferous stratigraphic units in Texas
- Paleontology in Texas
