= Austin Chalk =

Geologic formation in Texas, United States

- Stratigraphic range: Upper Cretaceous
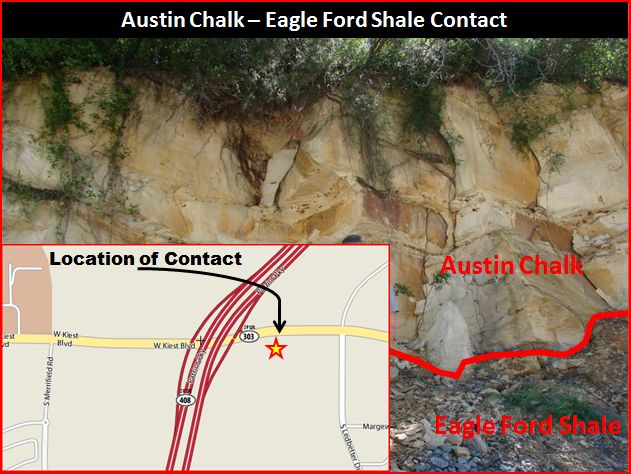
- Contact Austin Chalk - Eagle Ford Shale in Texas
- Type: Geological formation
- Sub-units: Atco Formation, McKown Formation, Pflugerville Member

Lithology
- Primary: Chalk

Location
- Region: Gulf Coast
- Country: United States

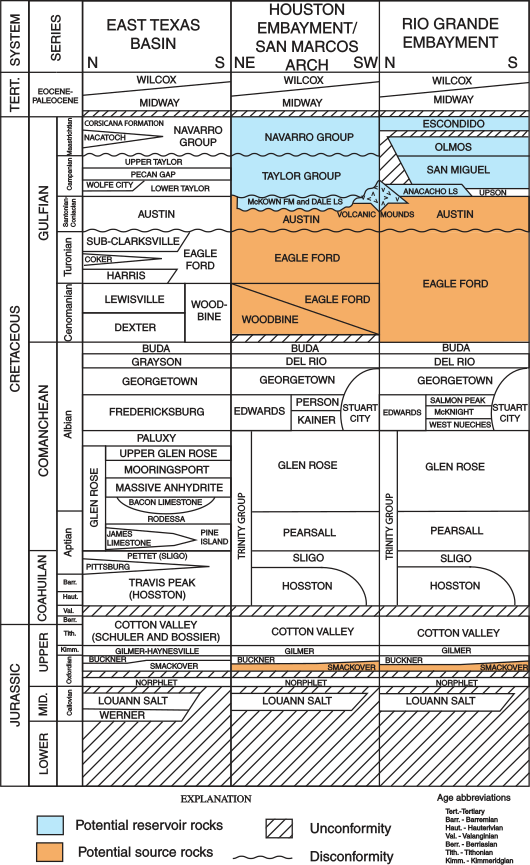
Austin Chalk stratigraphic column

The Austin Chalk is an upper Cretaceous geologic formation in the Gulf Coast region of the United States. It is named after type section outcrops near Austin, Texas. The formation is made up of chalk and marl.

== Fossils ==
The putative galloanseran bird Austinornis lentus has been found in the Austin Chalk. The general absence of dinosaurs is a reflection of the Austin limestone being marine in origin, primarily composed of microscopic shell fragments from floating sea organisms known as "coccolithophores" (the same organisms that contributed to the White Cliffs of Dover, on the south coast of England). Nevertheless, the Austin Chalk will occasionally produce fossils of larger creatures, such as Inoceramus clams, ammonite cephalopods, and large marine vertebrates such as Xiphactinus, a predaceous fish.

== Geology ==
The rocks of the Austin Chalk consist of recrystallized, fossiliferous, interbedded chalks and marls. Exposures of Austin Chalk are mainly seen in quarries, roadcuts, and stream beds where water eroded the soil. Austin Chalk outcrops can be seen throughout Dallas, and extend south underneath I-35 down into Austin and San Antonio. Volcanic ash layers are present in the Austin chalk, and dates obtained from radioactive minerals in these ash layers indicate they were deposited by wind from distant erupting volcanoes around 86 mya. These eruptions occurred along a 250-mile long by 50 mile wide belt of submarine volcanoes, which are located in present-day south-central Texas. This belt of volcanoes coincides with the trend of the Balcones Fault zone and is known as the Balcones volcanic province. Evidence of these ancient volcanoes is only visible in a few places as most were buried by the Austin and Taylor Group, and now are in the subsurface. The presence of this volcanism during deposition of the Austin Chalk is correlated with the Laramide orogeny. Sea level rose for conditions to be right for the deposition of the Austin Chalk, which also coincides with the maximum extent of the Cretaceous Interior Seaway. The depths of the deposition of the Austin Chalk occurred in ~250 m or 820 ft of water, well-suited to the deposition of coccoliths.

== See also ==
- Geology of the Dallas-Fort Worth Metroplex
- List of dinosaur-bearing rock formations
- Orr Branch
