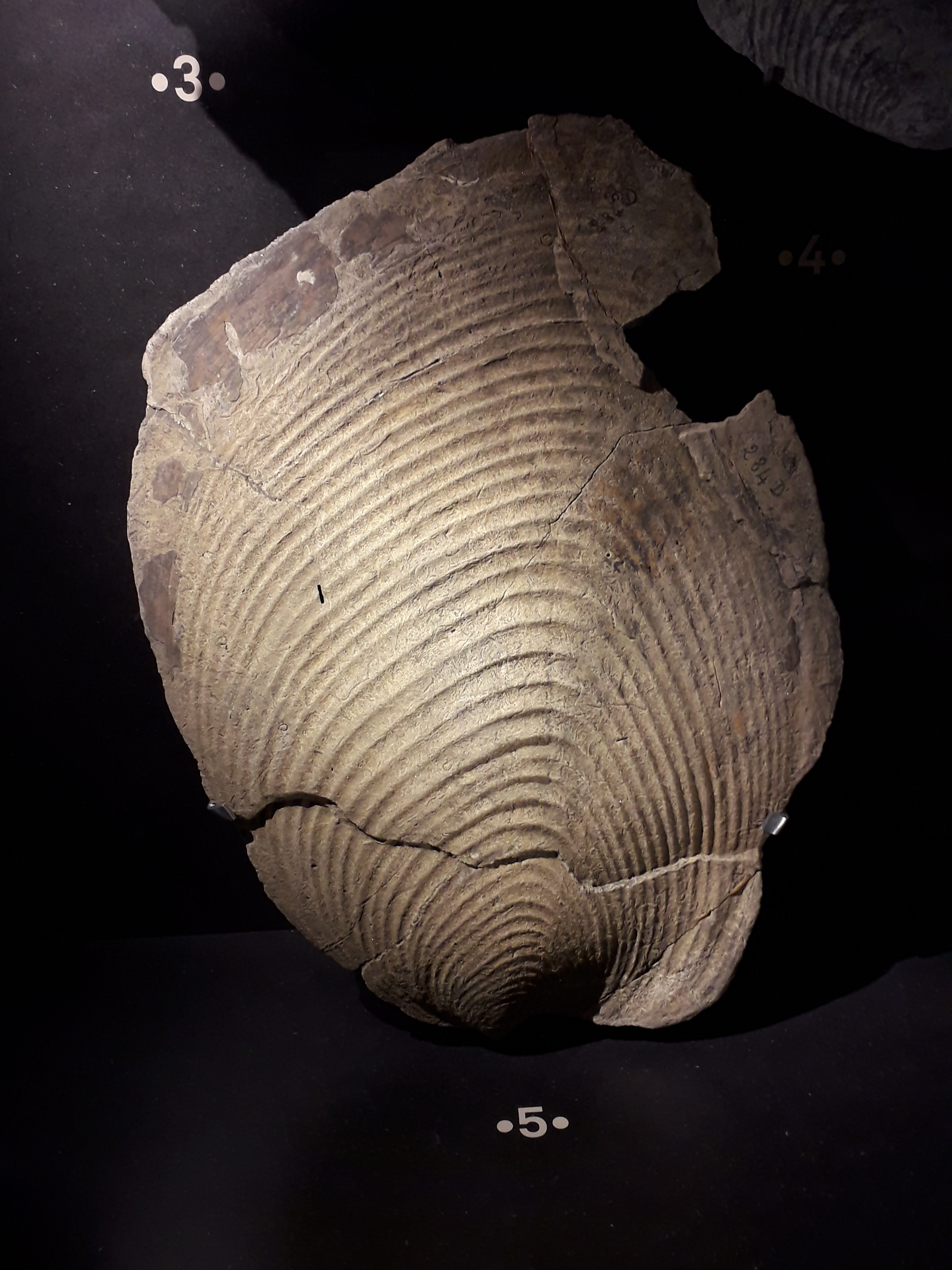

Scientific classification
- Domain: Eukaryota
- Kingdom: Animalia
- Phylum: Mollusca
- Class: Bivalvia
- Order: Pteriida
- Family: †Inoceramidae
- Genus: †Inoceramus; Sowerby, 1814

Species
- See text

= Inoceramus =

Inoceramus Temporal range: Early Jurassic-Maastrichtian ~189–66 Ma

Extinct genus of bivalves

Inoceramus (Greek: translation "fibrous shell" for the fibrous structure of the mineral crystals in the shell) is an extinct genus of fossil marine pteriomorphian bivalves that superficially resembled the related winged pearly oysters of the extant genus Pteria. They lived from the Early Jurassic to latest Cretaceous.

The English naturalist James Sowerby proposed the name Inoceramus at a meeting of the Linnean Society in London in 1814 but a text version was not published until 1822. He gave the etymology from Greek with Latin translation as: ἴς fibra [fiber] et κέραμος testa [shell]. The fibrous-appearing mineral structure of the shell inspired the name choice: "[I]t consists entirely of a substance composed of parallel perpendicular fibres, and much more conspicuously so than Pinna or any other genus".

== Taxonomy ==
The taxonomy of the inoceramids is disputed, with genera such as Platyceramus sometimes classified as subgenus within Inoceramus. Also the number of valid species in this genus is disputed.

== Description ==
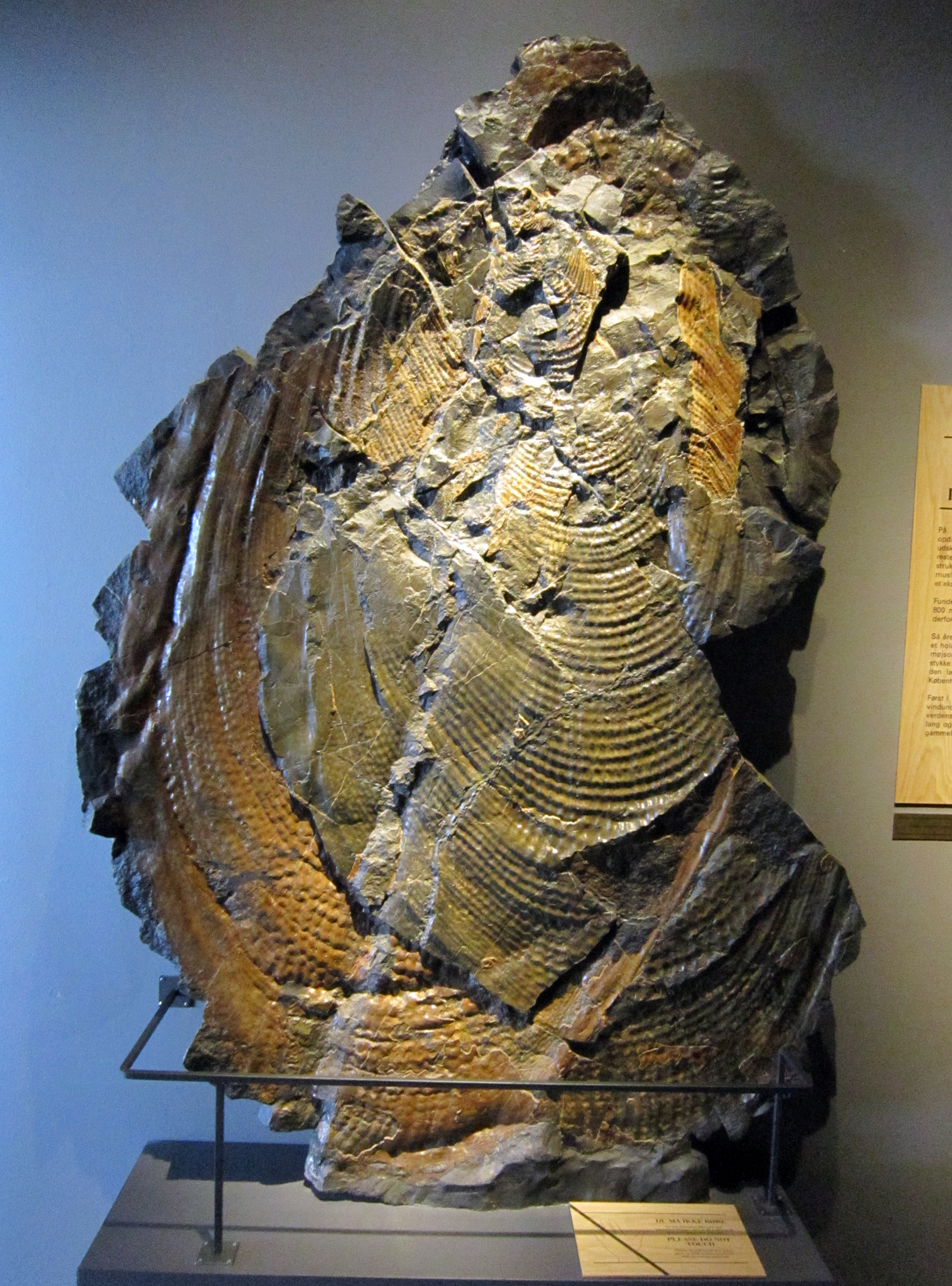
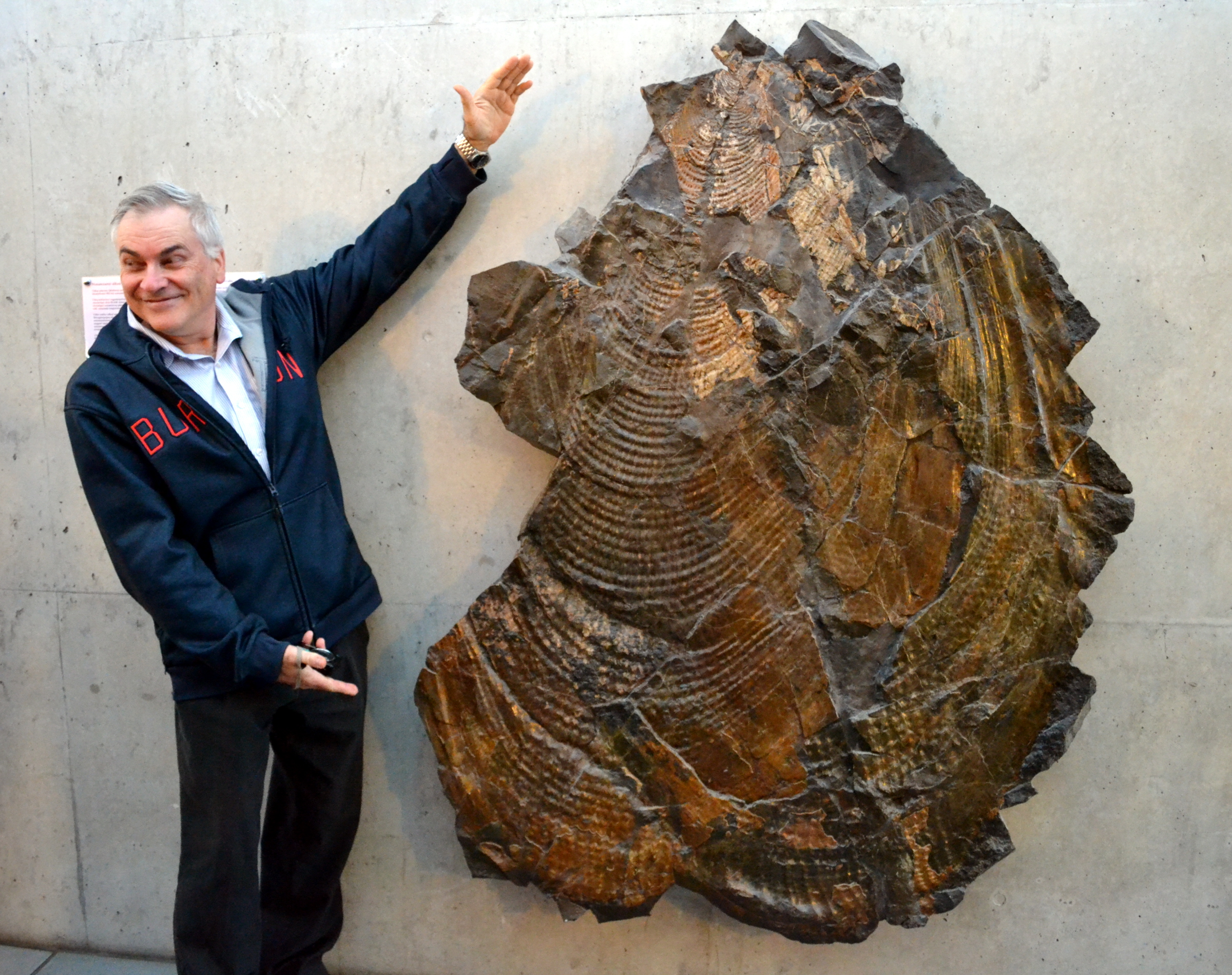
Halves of a gigantic specimen of I. steenstrupi 187 cm (74 in) across, found on the Nuussuaq Peninsula, Greenland

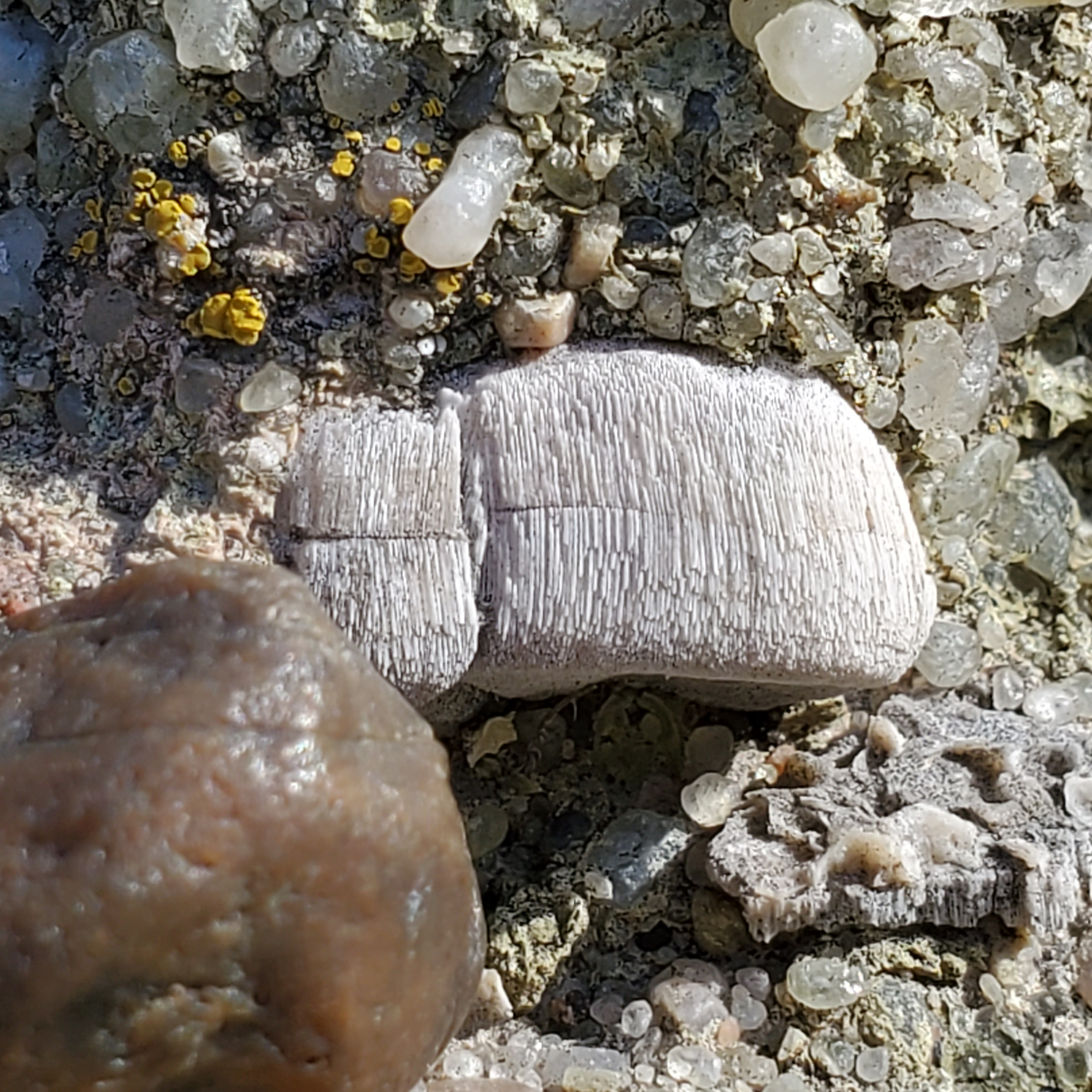
Weathered shell fragment of the closely related Cremnoceramus difformis, highlighting the orientation and texture of the calcite prisms of the Inoceramids.

Inoceramids had thick shells composed of "prisms" of calcite deposited perpendicular to the surface, and unweathered fossils commonly preserve the mother-of-pearl luster the shells had in life. Most species have prominent growth lines which appear as raised semicircles concentric to the growing edge of the shell.

In 1952, the huge specimen of Inoceramus steenstrupi 187 cm long, was found in Qilakitsoq, the Nuussuaq Peninsula, Greenland. This fossil is 83 Ma old, the Upper Santonian or Lower Campanian stage. Paleontologists suggest that the giant size of some species was an adaptation for life in the murky bottom waters, with a correspondingly large gill area that would have allowed the animal to survive in oxygen-deficient waters.

== Selected species ==
- †I. aequicostatus Voronetz, 1937
- †I. albertensis McLearn, 1926
- †I. altifluminis McLearn, 1943
- †I. americanus Walaszczyk & Cobban, 2006
- †I. andinus Wilckens, 1907
- †I. anglicus Woods, 1911
- †I. anilis Pcelinceva, 1962
- †I. anomalus Heine, 1929
- †I. anomiaeformis Feruglio, 1936
- †I. apicalis Woods, 1912
- †I. arvanus Stephenson, 1953
- †I. bellvuensis
- †I. biformis Tuomey, 1854
- †I. brownei Marwick, 1953
- †I. carsoni McCoy, 1865
- †I. comancheanus
- †I. confertim Roemer, 1849
- †I. constellatus Woods, 1904
- †I. corpulentus McLearn, 1926
- †I. coulthardi McLearn, 1926
- †I. cuvieri Sowerby, 1814
- †I. dakotensis
- †I. dominguesi Maury, 1930
- †I. dowlingi McLearn, 1931
- †I. dunveganensis McLearn, 1926
- †I. elburzensis Fantini, 1966
- †I. everesti Oppel, 1862
- †I. fibrosus Meek & Hayden, 1857
- †I. formosulus Voronetz, 1937
- †I. fragilis Haal & Meek, 1856
- †I. frechi Flegel, 1905
- †I. galoi Boehm, 1907
- †I. gibbosus
- †I. ginterensis Pergament, 1966
- †I. glacierensis Walaszczyk & Cobban, 2006
- †I. haast Hochstetter, 1863
- †I. howelli White, 1876
- †I. incelebratus Pergament, 1966
- †I. inconditus Marwick, 1953
- †I. kystatymensis Koschelkina, 1960
- †I. lamarcki Parkinson, 1819
- †I. lateris Rossi de Gargia & Camacho, 1965
- †I. mesabiensis Bergquist, 1944
- †I. morii Hayami, 1959
- †I. multiformis Pergament, 1971
- †I. mytiliformis Fantini, 1966
- †I. nipponicus Nagao & Matsumoto, 1939
- †I. perplexus
- †I. pictus
- †I. pontoni McLearn, 1926
- †I. porrectus Voronetz, 1937
- †I. prefragilis Stephenson, 1952
- †I. proximus'' Tuomey, 1854
- †I. pseudolucifer Afitsky, 1967
- †I. quenstedti Pcelinceva, 1933
- †I. robertsoni Walaszczyk & Cobban, 2006
- †I. saskatchewanensis Warren, 1934
- †I. selwyni McLearn, 1926
- †I. sokolovi Walaszczyk & Cobban, 2006
- †I. steenstrupi de Loriol, 1883
- †I. steinmanni Wilckens, 1907
- †I. subdepressus Meek & Hayden, 1861
- †I. tenuirostratus Meek & Hayden, 1862
- †I. triangularis'' Tuomey, 1854
- †I. undabundus Meek & Hayden, 1862
- †I. undulato Roemer, 1849
- †I. ussuriensis Voronetz, 1937

== Distribution ==
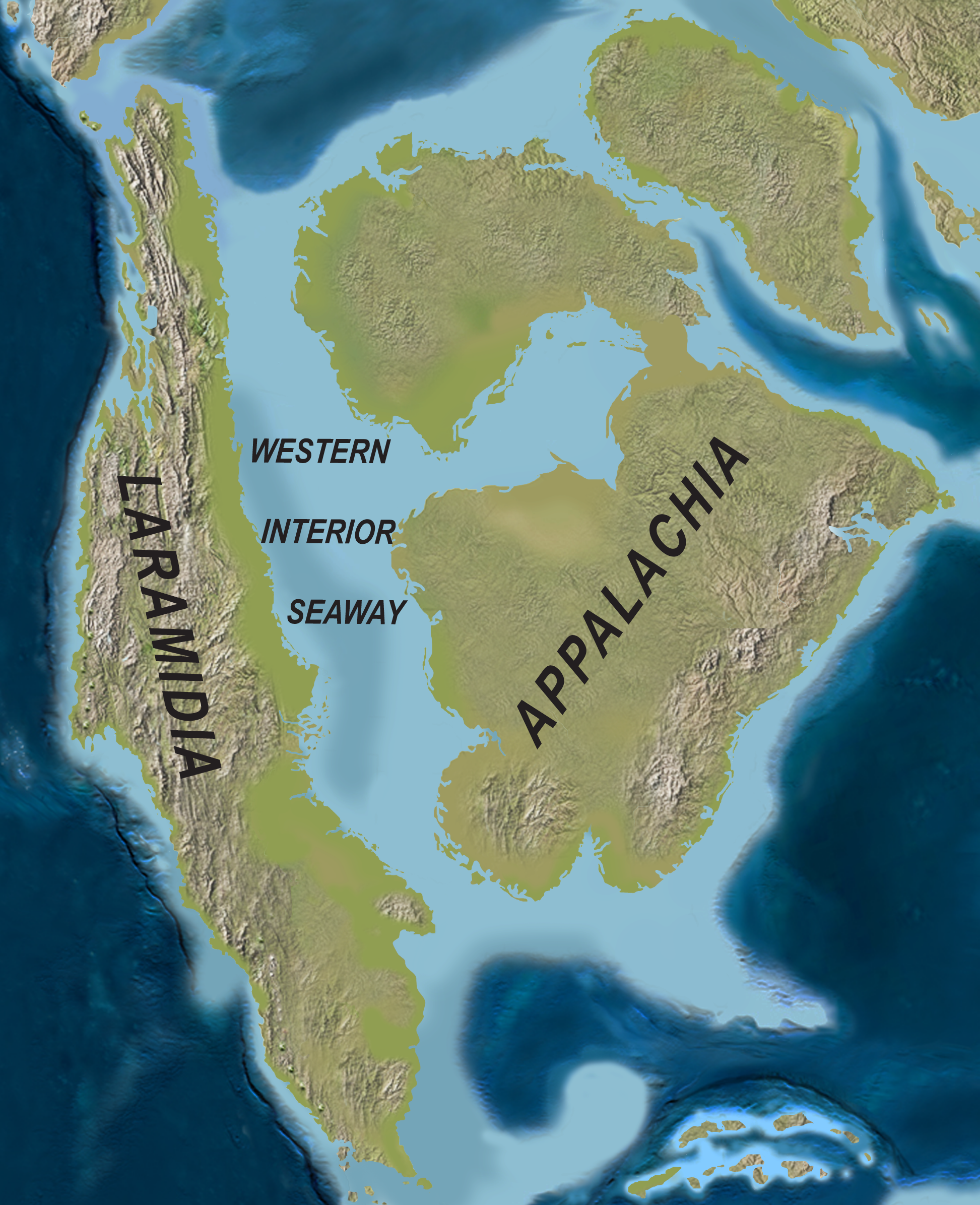
The Western Interior Seaway that covered North America during the Cretaceous

Species of Inoceramus had a worldwide distribution during the Cretaceous and Jurassic periods (from 189.6 to 66.043 Ma). Many examples are found in the Pierre Shale of the Western Interior Seaway in North America. Inoceramus can also be found abundantly in the Cretaceous Gault Clay that underlies London. Other locations for this fossil include Vancouver Island, British Columbia, Colombia (Hiló Formation, Tolima and La Frontera Formation, Boyacá, Cundinamarca and Huila).

== Gallery ==
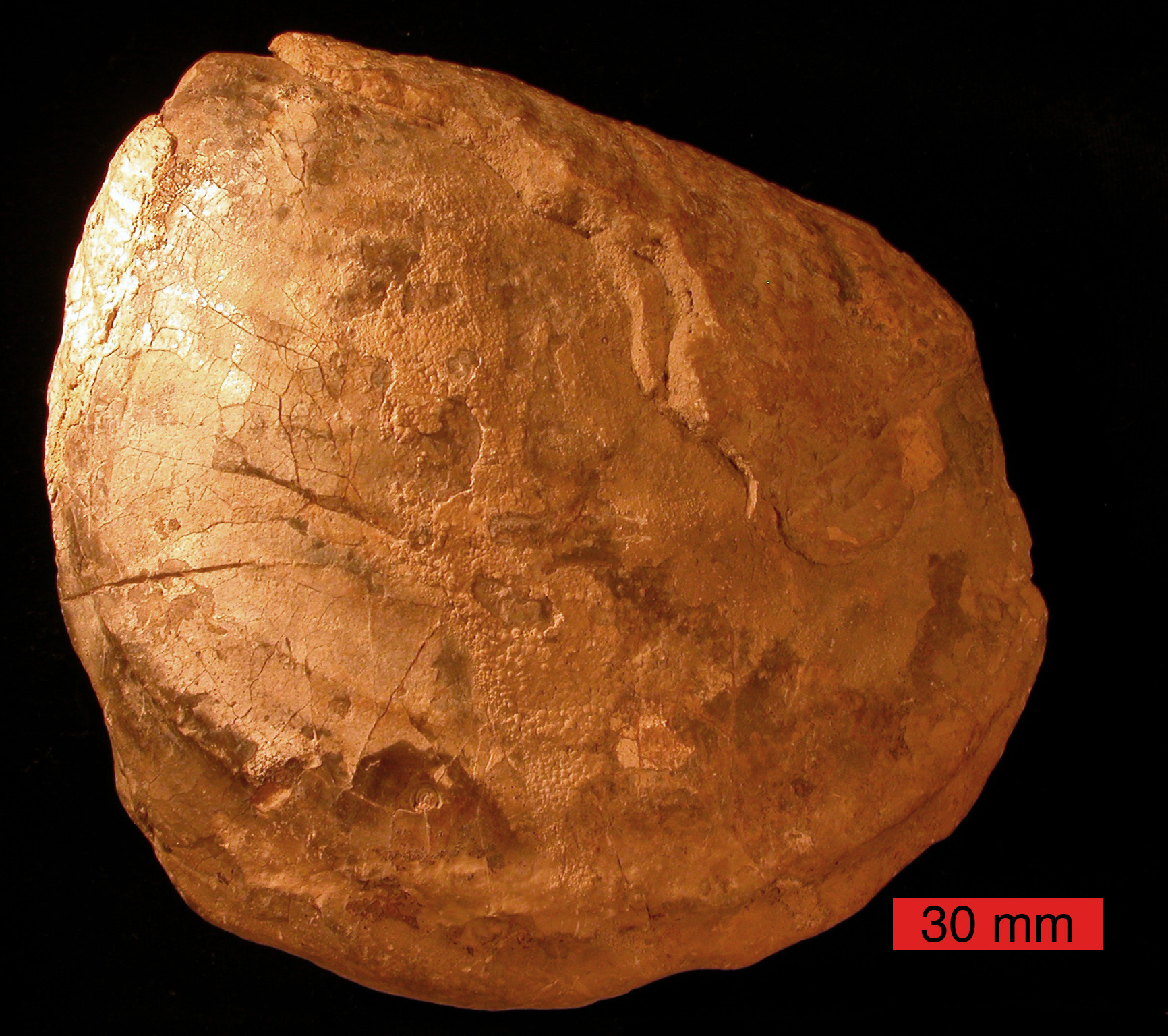
Inoceramus from the Cretaceous of South Dakota

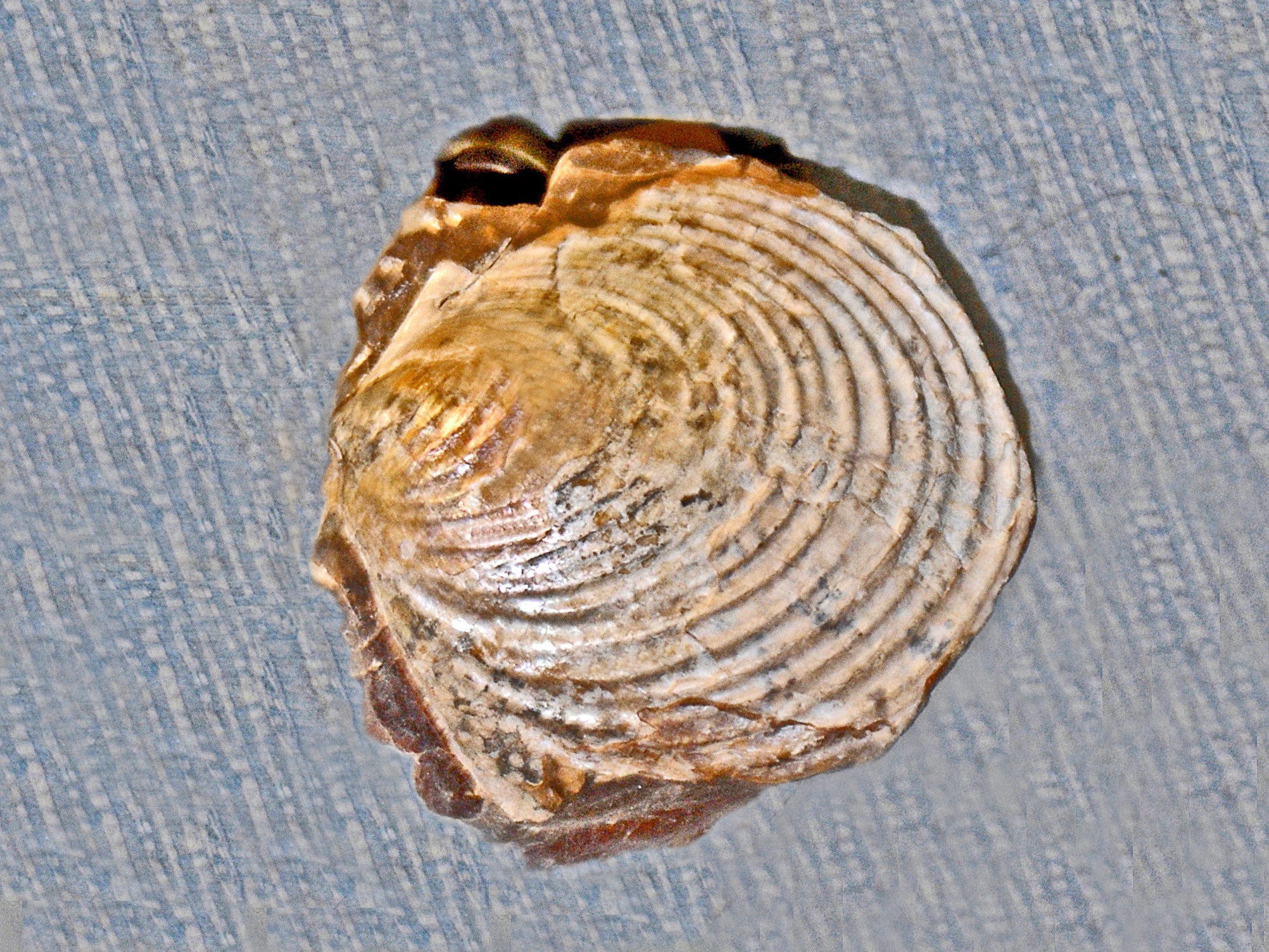
Inoceramus proximus

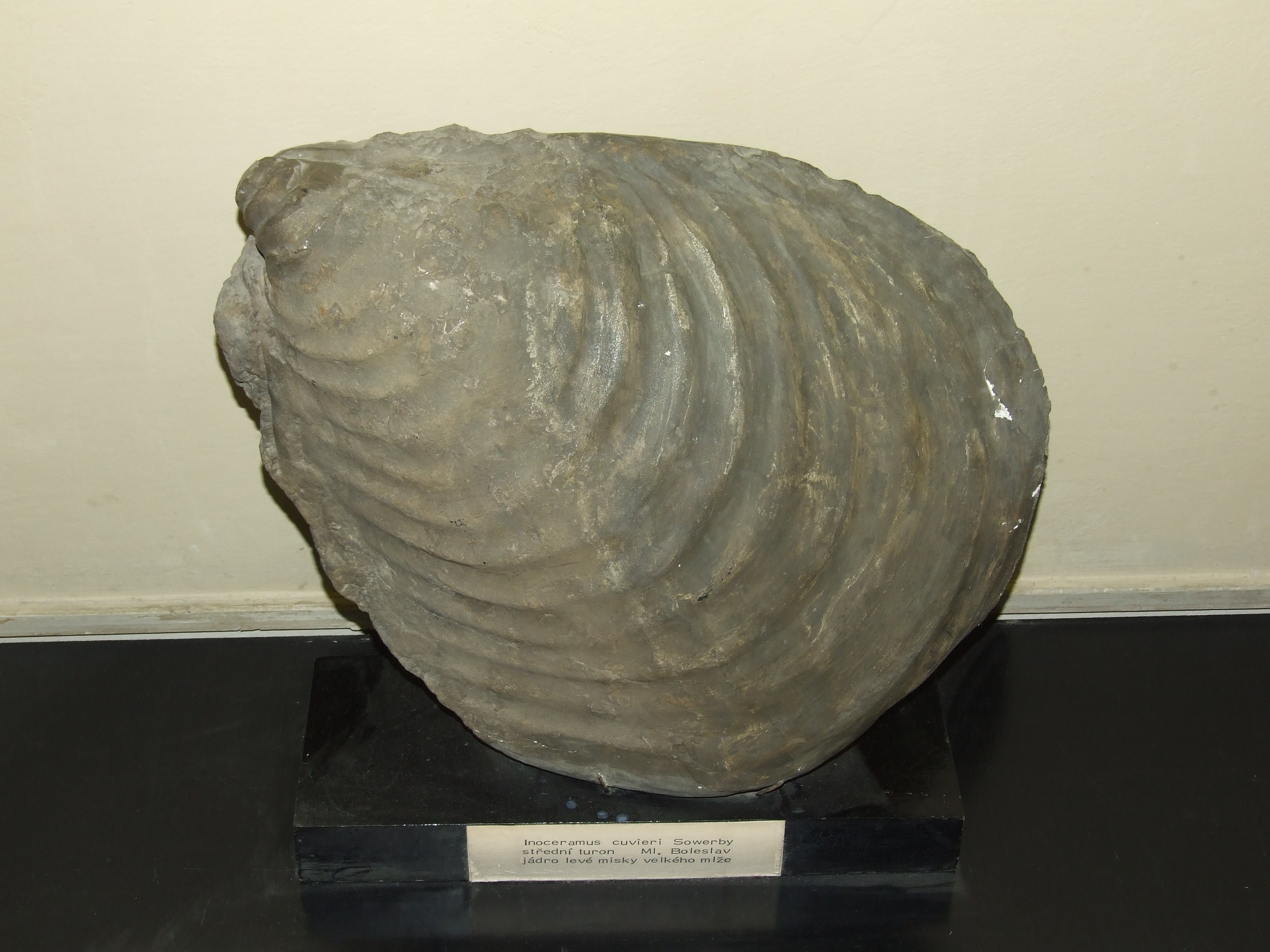
Inoceramus cuvieri

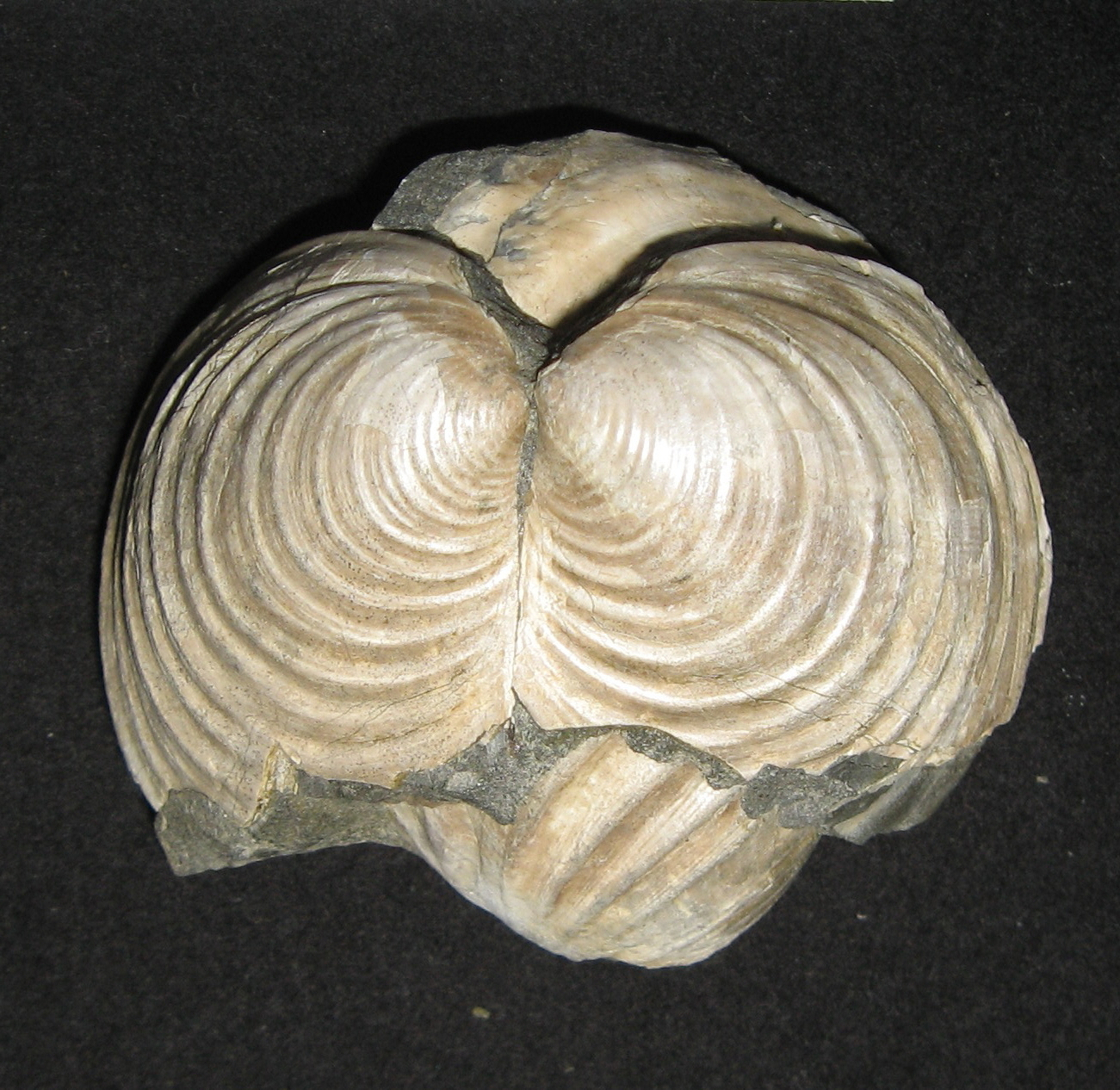
Inoceramus vancouverensis

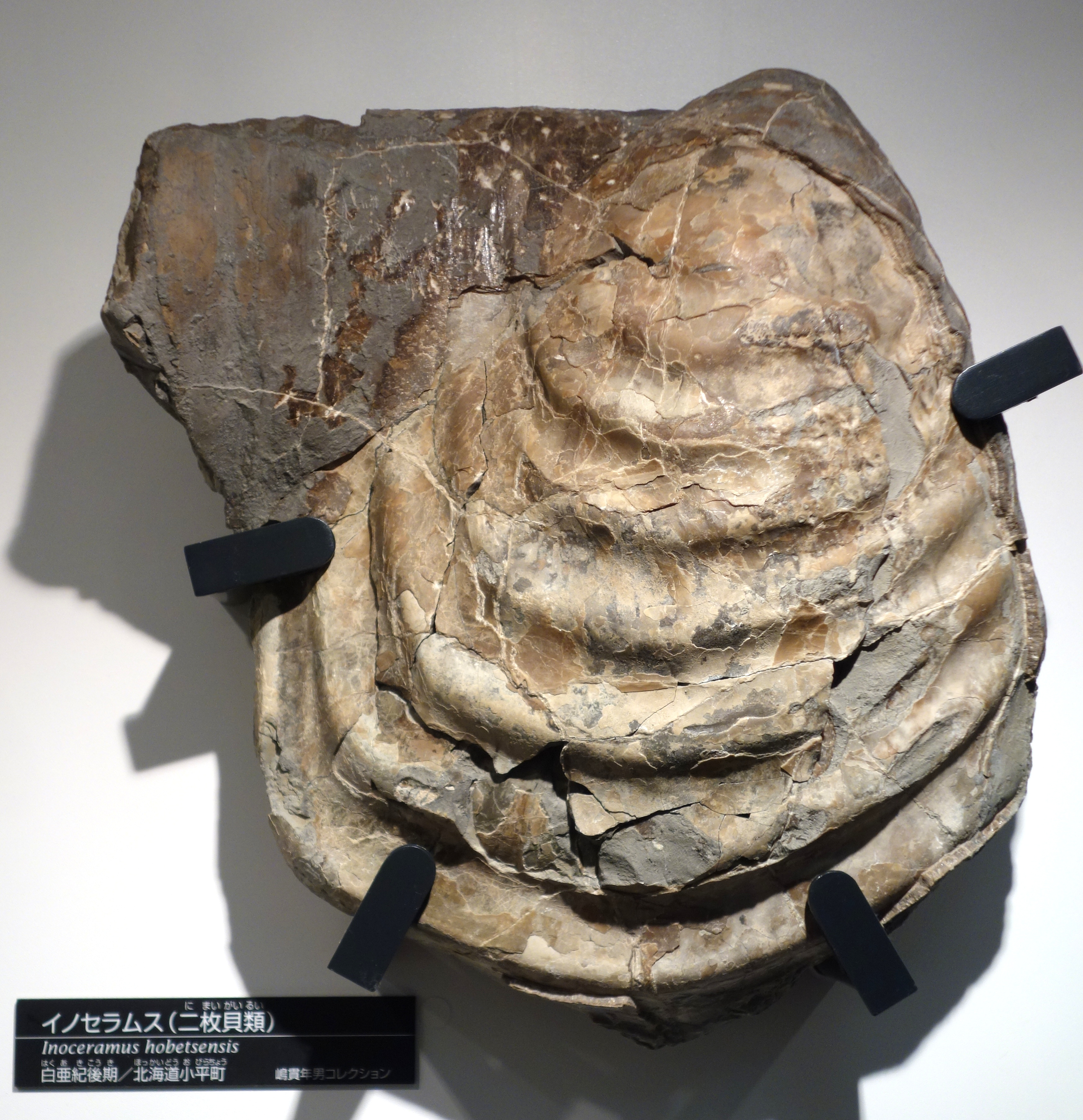
Inoceramus hobetsensis
